= Lips: I Love the 80's =

2010 video game

Lips: I Love the 80s
- Developer(s): iNiS
- Publisher(s): Microsoft Game Studios
- Designer(s): Keiichi Yano
- Platform(s): Xbox 360
- Release: EU: April 2, 2010
- Genre(s): Music / Rhythm
- Mode(s): Single-player, multiplayer

Lips: I Love the 80s (Stylised as Lips: I ♥ the 80s) is a karaoke game for the Xbox 360 games console, and the third follow-up to Lips. Like the other entries in the series, the game uses motion-sensitive wireless microphones, but like Lips: Party Classics it is compatible with USB microphones. It was only released in Europe.

== See also ==
- SingStar
- UltraStar – An open-source clone of the SingStar engine
- Rock Band
- Guitar Hero World Tour
- Karaoke Revolution
- Karaoke Revolution (2009 video game)
- Guitar Hero 5
- The Beatles: Rock Band
- Lips (video game)
- Lips: Number One Hits
- Lips: Party Classics
