= Osu! Tatakae! Ouendan (series) =

Series of rhythm video games

- Genre: Rhythm game
- Developer: iNiS
- Publisher: Nintendo
- Platform: Nintendo DS
- First release: Osu! Tatakae! Ouendan; July 28, 2005
- Latest release: Moero! Nekketsu Rhythm Damashii Osu! Tatakae! Ouendan 2 May 17, 2007

The Osu! Tatakae! Ouendan series was developed by iNiS Corporation exclusively for the Nintendo DS system and published by Nintendo. It consists of the Japan-exclusive Osu! Tatakae! Ouendan duology and its international counterpart, Elite Beat Agents, which contains the same gameplay but had its characters and themes adapted to fit a Western audience.

== Overview ==
In all three games, players take control of a small 3-person team of skilled dancers who use the power of song and dance to aid people who specifically call for their help in overcoming their problems by raising their morality The team the player controls, which is an ōendan in the Ouendan duology or a squad of special agents in Elite Beat Agents, always consists of a lead dancer flanked by two backup dancers. Each mission is divided into multiple phases (typically four) and involves the dance team performing cool moves to the beat and rhythm of a particular song, which must be done successfully by performing stylus gestures on targets displayed on a beatmap over the Nintendo DS' touch screen that each represent a beat from the song, using circles that shrink over the targets and numerical labels on most of them as guides for when they need to be played to stay in sync with the song. Doing so successfully grants small boosts to a constantly declining health meter, representing the effectiveness of the dance team in helping the person in trouble, with the amount depending on the timing of each target hit. The amount of health remaining also affects whether or not the person being helped is able to improve their situation at the end of each phase, with the ensuing outcome being represented as a cutscene on the top screen, which will also in turn affect the mission's ending if it is completed successfully by finishing the performance without allowing the health bar to reach zero for mission failure. The timing at which beats are played also affects scoring and ultimately the performance grade given at the end of a cleared mission, with an extra bonus being awarded each time all beats of a certain color group are played with good enough timing, depending on the timing quality of the group's final beat. There are four levels of difficulty, with the hardest one replacing the entire dance team with cheerleaders using pom-poms.

== Games ==
Release timeline
2005	Osu! Tatakae! Ouendan
2006	Elite Beat Agents
2007	Osu! Tatakae! Ouendan 2

=== Osu! Tatakae! Ouendan ===
Osu! Tatakae! Ouendan is the first rhythm game developed by iNiS for the Nintendo DS, released in 2005. Based on ideas by iNiS founder Keiichi Yano and drawing upon a setlist of J-pop songs, it follows the efforts of a ōendan in Yuhi Town in Tokyo, Japan to use their cheering and dance skills to help people in need throughout the larger city.

=== Elite Beat Agents ===
Following the success of Ouendan, iNiS developed an spiritual sequel to the game based on a new intellectual property that caters to an international audience, releasing it in 2006 outside of Japan as Elite Beat Agents. The player must help a team of special agents assist people in need across the world to the tune and beat of songs from four Anglophone countries, the United States, Canada, the United Kingdom and New Zealand.

=== Moero! Nekketsu Rhythm Damashii Osu! Tatakae! Ouendan 2 ===
Released in 2007 in lieu of a Japanese localization of Elite Beat Agents, Osu! Tatakae! Ouendan 2 is a sequel to the original Osu! Tatakae! Ouendan and introduces a rival ōendan team from Asahi Town, clad in blue, who is also at work helping people in need, while competing with the Yuhi Town Ouendan, before ultimately collaborating with them to save the world once again.

== History and legacy ==
Following the release of acclaimed music game Gitaroo Man for the PlayStation 2, iNiS founder Keiichi Yano began to come up with ideas for a new game that developed substantially upon learning about the Nintendo DS system at an E3 and understanding how a rhythm game could be tailored for it. Combining this knowledge with his adoption of the invigorating mentality of ōendan to improve his company's flagging morale after Gitaroo's unexpected commercial failure, his development team then put together what would become Osu! Tatakae! Ouendan. This new DS-exclusive rhythm game drew interest from Nintendo, which agreed to publish the game.

Upon release in 2005 exclusively in Japan, the game drew praise and interest from import gamers, leading iNiS to consider localizing the game for non-Japanese players, before ultimately deciding on coming up with a new intellectual property that retains Ouendan's gameplay, with a different setlist, premise, scenarios and characters that are geared towards a more American audience. The resulting product, which replaced the ōendan with a team of special agents helping people around the world, was a spiritual sequel titled Elite Beat Agents and released in 2006 outside of Japan, receiving critical acclaim, winning several awards, and even drawing the interest of Japanese import gamers. The following year, iNiS released a sequel to Ouendan titled Moero! Nekketsu Rhythm Damashii! Osu! Tatakae! Ouendan 2. Following its release, Nintendo offered limited-time downloadable content for Ouendan 2 from DS Download Stations that added character skins and multiplayer characters from Elite Beat Agents.

All three games experienced sluggish sales and efforts to develop further sequels failed to come to fruition. During the life cycle of the DS' successor, the Nintendo 3DS, iNiS asked Nintendo if a third Ouendan game could be made on the platform, but the publisher declined to move ahead with it due to business reasons. Yano also expressed interest in making a sequel to Elite Beat Agents in an interview one decade after its release, but remarked that it could only happen if Nintendo had another system like the DS that would suit its unique design.

iNiS' three rhythm games for the DS inspired a new fangame for personal computers, titled osu! and released months after Ouendan 2. It emphasizes the three games' mechanics while omitting the exposition behind them and allows players to create their own beatmaps. The characters in all three games also received minor representation in two installments of the Super Smash Bros. fighting game series. The three games also inspired the gameplay of few other DS rhythm games, namely the DS versions of Happy Feet and Michael Jackson: The Experience, as well as Looney Tunes: Cartoon Conductor.
