= Lips: Party Classics =

2010 video game

- Developer(s): iNiS
- Publisher(s): Microsoft Game Studios
- Designer(s): Keiichi Yano
- Platform(s): Xbox 360
- Release: EU: 26 February 2010; NA: 2 March 2010; AU: 18 March 2010
- Genre(s): Music/Rhythm
- Mode(s): Single-player, multiplayer

Lips: Party Classics is a karaoke video game for the Xbox 360, and the second follow-up to the original Lips. The game was developed by iNiS and published by Microsoft Game Studios. The game, like all the other titles in the main Lips series, features the use of motion sensitive wireless microphones and includes 40 upbeat songs from the past decades.

== Gameplay changes ==
For the first time in the series, Party Classics is compatible with regular USB microphones. Also, while Lips: Number One Hits already supports a recording feature, Party Classics features an enhanced version of it. The game features new achievements and Avatar Awards.

== Reception ==
Reception

Aggregate score
Aggregator	Score
Metacritic	69/100

Review scores
Publication	Score
IGN	7.3/10
Official Xbox Magazine (UK)	7/10
Official Xbox Magazine (US)	6.5/10

Lips: Party Classics received "average" reviews according to the review aggregation website Metacritic. The game was praised for having a very strong playlist, but was criticized for a lack of novelties.

== See also ==
- SingStar
- UltraStar - An open-source clone of the SingStar engine
- Rock Band
- Guitar Hero World Tour
- Karaoke Revolution
- Karaoke Revolution (2009)
- Lips: Number One Hits
- Guitar Hero 5
- The Beatles: Rock Band
- Lips
