= Osu! =

2007 rhythm video game

osu!
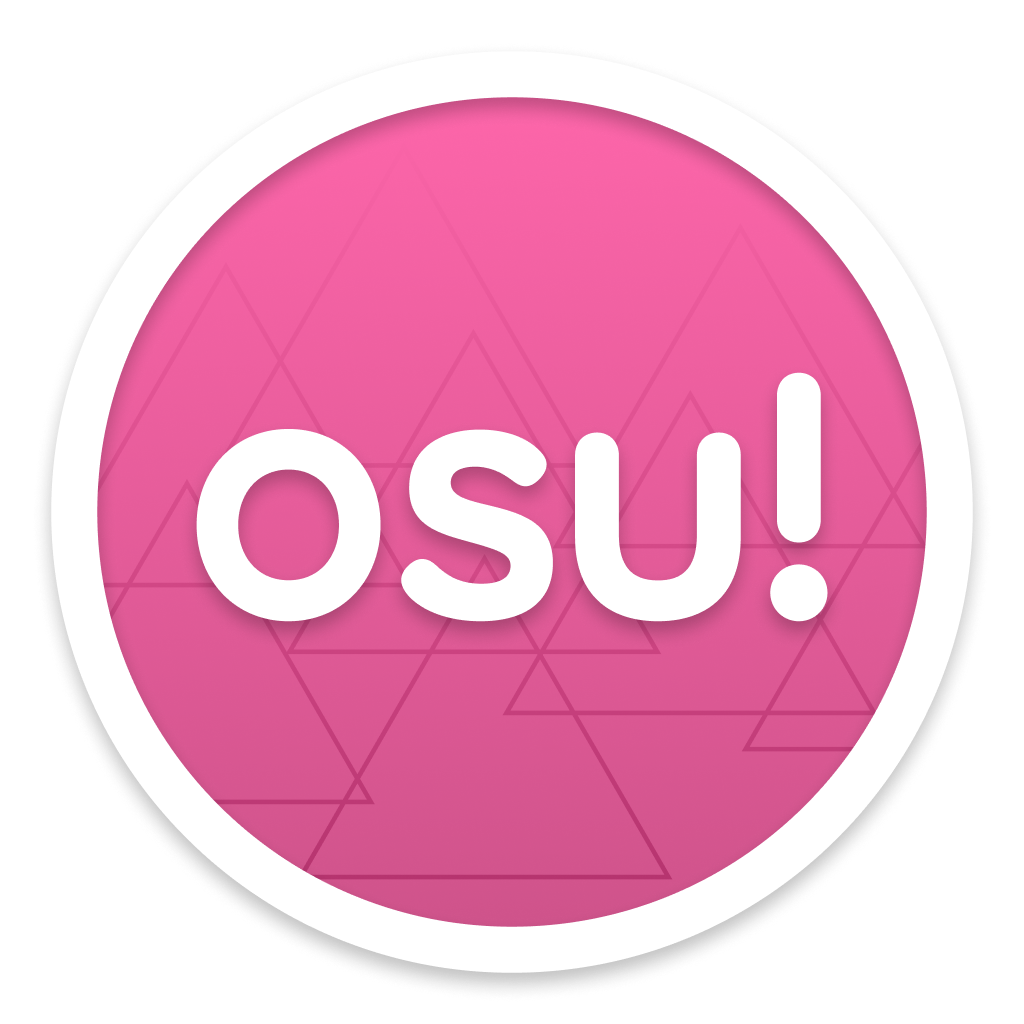
- Logo since May 2024
- Original author: Dean Lewis "peppy" Herbert
- Developer: osu! development team
- Release: September 16, 2007; 19 years ago
- Written in: C#
- Middleware: OpenTK
- Operating system: Microsoft Windows; macOS; Linux; Android; iOS
- Available in: 37 languages
- List of languages Arabic, Belarusian, Bulgarian, Catalan, Czech, Danish, English, German, Greek, Spanish, Finnish, Filipino, French, Hebrew, Hungarian, Indonesian, Italian, Japanese, Korean, Lithuanian, Dutch, Norwegian, Polish, Portuguese, Brazilian Portuguese, Romanian, Russian, Slovak, Slovenian, Serbian, Swedish, Thai, Turkish, Ukrainian, Vietnamese, Chinese, Traditional Chinese
- Type: Rhythm game
- License: MIT (osu!lazer code); CC BY-NC (osu!lazer assets); Freeware (osu!stable, the predecessor to osu!lazer)
- Website: osu.ppy.sh
- Repository: github.com/ppy/osu

osu! (Note: Pronounced variously in English: /ˈoʊsuː/, /ˈoʊs/.) is an open source rhythm game originally created and self-published by Australian developer Dean Herbert as a freeware. It was released for Microsoft Windows on 16 September 2007, with later ports to macOS, Linux, Android and iOS.

The gameplay of osu! is based on the Osu! Tatakae! Ouendan series of rhythm games, which primarily involves clicking notes, which appear as circles, using a cursor or finger. Since the game's release, three other official "rulesets" (game modes)^{[1:38]} have been added, taking inspiration from various games. Unlike many rhythm games, levels in osu! are created and uploaded by users, increasing the range and volume of the song library. The game has about 20,000 daily active users.

The game has a significant connection to Japanese culture and anime music. The community also frequently organizes tournaments between players.

== Gameplay ==
osu! is a rhythm game with multiple distinct game modes.^{[1:38]} If the player misses too many notes, they fail the song and must retry. Gameplay modifiers, called mods, can change gameplay in different ways — for example, by speeding up the song or increasing the size of circles. Players play through levels consisting of gameplay elements "mapped" to songs, each of which is automatically grouped into a mapset (officially referred to as a beatmap). Each mapset consists of one or multiple levels, usually but not always mapped to the same song, referred to officially as difficulties and colloquially as beatmaps or maps. A listing for finding beatmaps with advanced search features is provided both in-game and on the official website, and local files containing beatmaps may be imported. A few beatmaps, including a tutorial, are bundled with a new installation of the game.

Beatmaps can be created and uploaded by all users, though only certain beatmaps are considered to be official game content, known as ranked maps. In order for a beatmap to become ranked, it must go through a specific ranking process. In the game's single-player mode, scores on beatmaps can be compared with other players, who are ranked on an online leaderboard. Scores are also measured using their performance points (abbreviated as pp), which account for various aspects of a player's skill; a player's ranking in a given gamemode is calculated using the 200 highest beatmap performance point scores they have attained in that gamemode. Users can add others as friends and chat in-game, and multiple multiplayer modes allow groups of people to play beatmaps either synchronously or asynchronously with each other.^{[0:58]}

=== Rulesets (game modes) ===
Examples of osu! gameplay

osu!standard

osu!taiko

osu!catch

osu!mania

The game's original and most popular ruleset, based on Ouendan, is also known as osu!standard. There are also three alternative rulesets, osu!mania, osu!taiko, and osu!catch, and the game additionally supports user-generated custom rulesets.^{[1:35]}

In osu!standard, the game awards score based on the judgement obtained for each note, with more score being awarded for better judgements.

osu!standard is the original game mode of osu!. The game mode revolves around three types of notes — hit circle, slider and spinner. Hit circles appear as notes over a song's runtime, and the objective is to click or tap on the circles at the appropriate time and in the correct order, aided by rings called "approach circles" that close in on the hit circles to visually indicate the timing; more points are awarded the closer the approach circles are to the hit circles. The core gameplay is inspired by the Nintendo DS rhythm game Osu! Tatakae! Ouendan and its sequel Elite Beat Agents. Slider notes require that the player click and hold while moving the cursor across its predefined path. Spinner notes require the user to click and hold while rapidly spinning their cursor or finger around the centre of the screen.

osu!taiko is a game mode inspired by the rhythm game series Taiko no Tatsujin; it involves circles moving from right to left, requiring key-presses when they reach the left side. The user is presented with two main types of notes, "don" (red) and "kat" (blue), and they must differentiate them based on their colour and hit one of the two corresponding keys for that colour on their keyboard, with the user only receiving score if they pressed either one of the appropriate keys. The game mode also features large notes which reward the player with extra points when they press both of the corresponding keys for that colour at the same time rather than one key. Besides the common notes, the game mode also features drumrolls and swells, where the user must repeatedly hit both keys to clear the note.

osu!catch, formerly Catch the Beat, is a game mode loosely based on the "Catch It!!" minigame in early versions of rdm/rhythm-it, a Beatmania simulator, which was itself derived from the EZ2CATCH mode in EZ2DJ. In it, fruits fall from the top of the screen; the player controls a character at the bottom, whom they can move left and right with the goal of catching as much fruit on a plate as possible, earning them score.

osu!mania is a vertically scrolling rhythm game based on and named after rhythm game Beatmania. There are two types of notes, standard and hold notes; hold notes must be held down and released. The game mode splits the screen of the user into up to 18 different columns, or "keys," with each column being designated a different key on the keyboard. osu!mania is most commonly played as 4 key, due to the popularity of StepMania, or 7 key, due to the popularity of O2Jam. The goal of the player is to press the appropriate key at the correct time, as each note reaches the judgement line at the bottom (or alternatively top) of the screen.

=== Devices ===
osu! has been noted for encouraging the use of unique input devices — although the game can be played with a computer mouse, it is very often played with a graphics tablet with a pen, which more closely emulates the gameplay of Ouendan. The accessibility of using a mouse and keyboard is another reason given for the game's popularity. Gaming keyboard manufacturer Wooting released a three-key keyboard dedicated to playing osu! due to the popularity of their keyboards among the game's players.

== Mapping ==
While the majority of users only play through beatmaps, there is a sizable community of users who also create, or map beatmaps using the game's beatmap editor. These users are known as mappers. In addition to placing the objects in a beatmap, mappers may also add sound effects, known as hitsounds, to each object that play once the object is clicked (or released).

=== Beatmap Categories ===
Uploaded beatmaps fall into one of six categories.

Map Status Overview
Category	Leaderboard	Awards PP	Use Began	Description
Ranked	Yes	Yes	October 21, 2007	Passes the ranking criteria
Loved	Yes	No	October 17, 2016	Passes community-vote, ignoring ranking criteria
Qualified	Yes	No (Since August 25, 2015)	December 12, 2013	Provisional, a map put in a one week slot of time prior to ranking
Pending	No	No	October 21, 2007	Map has been marked by creator as pending, awaiting nomination
WIP	No	No	March 11, 2008	Map has been marked by creator as a work in progress
Graveyard	No	No	March 11, 2008	Map has not been updated for 4 weeks or longer
Approved	Yes	Yes (Since August 21, 2012)	July 31, 2008	Similar to Ranked, except it was used for maps that partly did not pass older ranking criteria

Ranked maps are the game's official content. They are maps that have adhere to the ranking criteria and have passed through the ranking process, which involves receiving two nominations from Beatmap Nominators (BNs), a group of well respected and community-vetted mappers granted the authority to decide which beatmaps meet the quality standards required to become a ranked map. Ranked maps have individual leaderboards, and scores on ranked maps award performance points.

Loved maps do not meet the ranking criteria, but are "loved" by the community, and thus are given an individual map leaderboard. Maps are nominated or loved through a form, and nominated maps are voted on monthly by the community. Maps that receive over 80% yes votes are then added to the loved category. Scores on loved maps do not award performance points. Introduced October 2016.

Qualified maps have received two nominations but are not yet ranked. After a map receives two nominations, it becomes qualified for a week to promote the map to more players. If a map is found to have issues during the qualified period, it may be disqualified, and will need to receive two new nominations. If a qualified map has not been disqualified for the seven day period, it becomes ranked. Qualified maps have individual leaderboards, and while scores on qualified maps used to award performance points, this was removed on August 25, 2015. Introduced August 2014.

Approved is defunct. It included maps that were either longer than a certain amount of time (initially four minutes and thirty seconds, later increased to six minutes), an attainable high score above a certain limit (initially ten million score, later increased to eighteen million ), or did not meet the ranking criteria in some specific manner (such as being especially challenging), but were still considered official game content. In the modern day, approved maps are functionally indistinguishable from ranked maps. Approved maps were required to receive three nominations from BNs rather than two. Approved maps had individual leaderboards, and scores on approved maps awarded performance points. Approved maps were introduced in 2008 and discontinued in 2014.

Pending maps have been completed and are either awaiting nominations from BNs or nominations to the loved category. Pending maps do not have individual map leaderboards, and scores on pending maps do not award performance points.

Work in Progress (WIP) maps are, as the name implies, still being worked on. While downloadable and playable from the website, they are incomplete products. WIP maps do not have individual leaderboards, and scores on WIP maps do not award performance points.

Graveyard is a category consisting of maps that were initially WIP or pending and have not been updated in four weeks. Graveyarded maps do not have individual map leaderboards, and scores on graveyarded maps do not award performance points.

=== Modding ===
Once a map is uploaded, it is given feedback, known as mods (not to be confused with game modifiers mentioned earlier, also called mods), before it is nominated. Users who mod maps are called modders, and modders may receive a reward for making helpful mods called kudosu, a portmanteau of "kudos" and "osu."

== Development ==
osu! was created by Dean Herbert, an Australian developer known online as "peppy", as a computer version of Osu! Tatakae! Ouendan and Elite Beat Agents. One of his goals was to create longevity through enabling users to craft their own beatmaps. Herbert had experience creating video games prior to osu!, having made some during high school and university, but has said he did not think it would become his job. He began developing osu! while attending university and had a working build of the game after a few hours, which he shared with friends. It was written in C# using the XNA framework. The game's first public release was on 16 September 2007, and an open beta was officially available starting on 17 October. Due to the game's growth in popularity as well as user feedback, Herbert later added the extra game modes osu!mania, osu!taiko, and osu!catch, later renamed to rulesets. After releasing osu!, Herbert, who had been working full-time for an IT company, gradually reduced his work hours to focus on maintaining osu!. According to Herbert, as of a July 2014 interview for the official osu! YouTube channel, the user interface of the game client and official website were undergoing full "revamps". In the same interview, he expressed interest or intentions to add major features to the game, such as a multiplayer power-up system inspired by Ouendan and TetriNET, 3D rotation of the field of play, and expanded multiplayer lobbies.

osu! has three different builds; osu!stable, the original freeware build which is currently in maintenance mode, osu!lazer, which is a free and open source rewrite of the original game and is currently in active development, with the end goal being for osu!lazer to become the only official build of osu!; and osu!stream, a legacy version designed for iOS and Android prior to the creation of osu!lazer.

== Reception and legacy ==
=== Critical response ===
Jeuxvideo.com reviewed osu! favorably with 18/20 points in 2015; praising its simple gameplay and its expansive community, but complaining about a high skill floor and its unoriginal gamemodes, as well as the prevalence of Japanese music, which they felt was excessive. In 2010, MMOGames.com reviewer Daniel Ball said that while the game was similar to Elite Beat Agents, it was differentiated by its community's large library of high-quality community-made content and customization.

=== Community and popularity ===
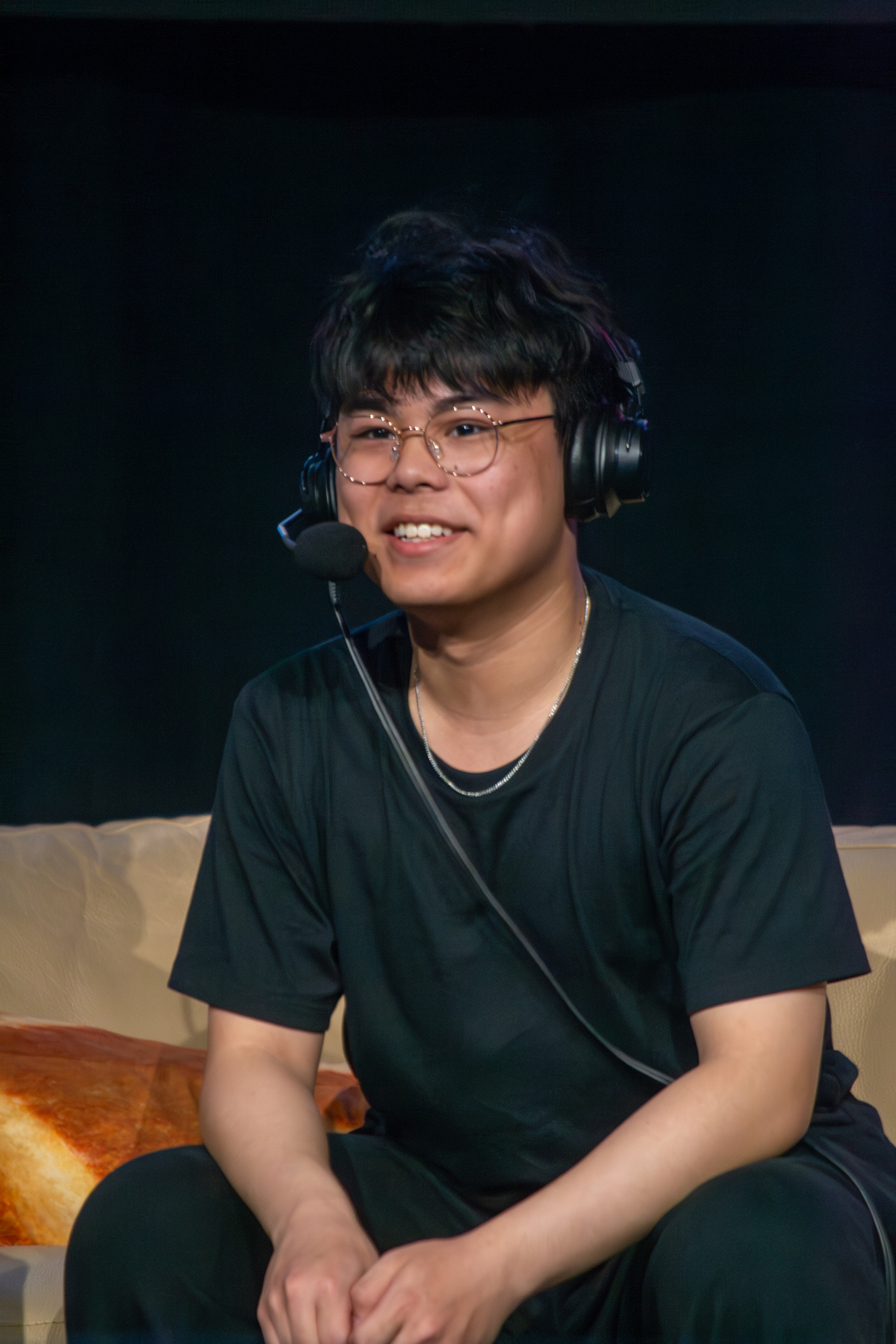
osu! top player "mrekk" commentating at cavoe's osu! event, the biggest in-person convention for the game.

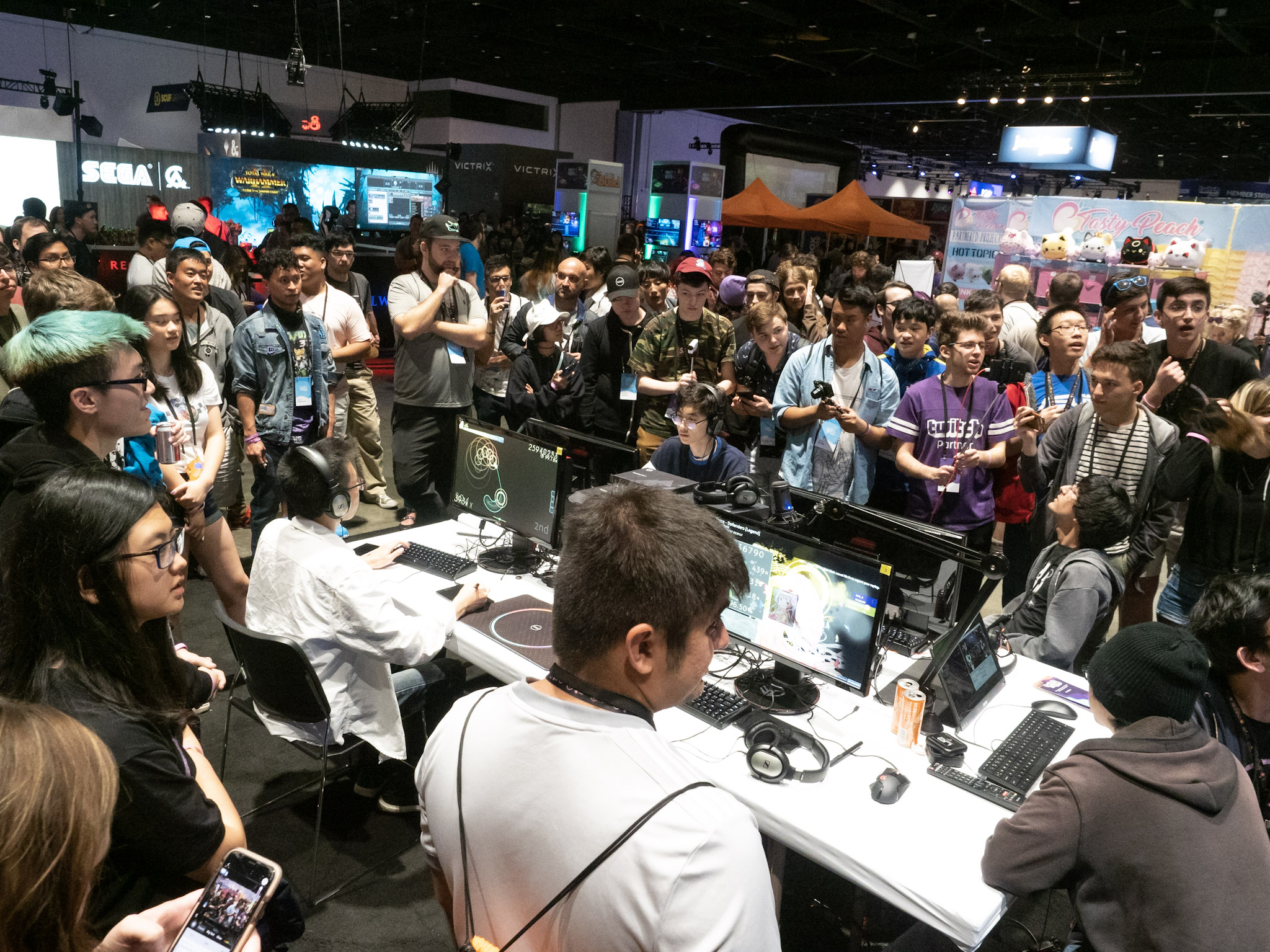
An audience watches players idke and RyuK compete at the osu! TwitchCon booth in 2018.

osu! has continued to gain popularity since its release, being widely shared on video and live streaming platforms like YouTube and TikTok. An artificial intelligence VTuber called Neuro-sama beat the top-ranked osu! player in 2022, mrekk, in a one-versus-one battle. As of July 2025, the game has about 20,000 daily active users and 30 million accounts. The game works on a model of community-generated beatmaps, which has been cited as a significant factor in its popularity and longevity. A large portion of the available music consists of songs from anime — the game itself is aimed at foreign fans of Japanese culture and is influenced by it, particularly due to its inspiration from Ouendan and the general continuing association of rhythm games with Japan since the 1990s.

Tournaments are held frequently as another mode of competition. The osu! World Cup is an annual tournament which consists of a modified group stage and a double-elimination bracket. The top 8 seeded national teams automatically advance to the winner's bracket, whilst national teams seeded 9-24 play in the group stage to either advance to the winner's or loser's brackets, and national teams seeded 25-40 play in the group stage to either advance to the loser's brackets or face elimination. National teams usually have 6 to 8 players on each team.

Due to the emphasis of game on quickly moving the mouse cursor to precise points on the screen, some players of multiplayer online battle arena games and first-person shooter games have used it to improve reflexes and mouse control, and it has been specifically recommended by some esports professionals like Ninja in the past.
