= Lips (video game) =

2008 video game

- Developer: iNiS
- Publisher: Microsoft Game Studios
- Designer: Keiichi Yano
- Platform: Xbox 360
- Release: NA: November 18, 2008; EU: November 21, 2008; AU: November 27, 2008
- Genre: Music / Rhythm
- Modes: Single-player, multiplayer

Lips is a 2008 karaoke video game for the Xbox 360. Lips was developed by iNiS and published by Microsoft Game Studios. The game features the use of motion sensitive wireless microphones and supports the use of songs already owned through a Zune or iPod. Lips has spawned three sequels: Lips: Number One Hits, Lips: Party Classics, and Lips: I Love the 80's. Localized versions of the game and sequels have been released in several countries, including Lips: Canta en Español (Lips: Sing in Spanish), and Deutsche Partyknaller (Lips: German Party Hits).

The Lips' microphones are compatible with Rock Band 2 and Guitar Hero: Metallica due to a patch that was released in summer 2009.

== Gameplay ==
The gameplay in Lips is similar to the gameplay of SingStar and Karaoke Revolution. In addition to supporting single-player, the game allows two players to sing duets or play competitively in various multiplayer modes including "Time Bomb", "Kiss", and "Vocal Fighters". Unlike most other music games, players cannot fail out of a song if they sing badly (or even if they don't sing at all). The game does not have a difficulty setting but rewards players for their singing in six categories including rhythm, pitch, and vibrato.

Players can connect a digital music player (such as an iPod or Zune), or use a USB flash drive, to sing along to their own music. The game will perform vocal reduction and score player like the included songs, except that the game will not display song lyrics. Players can also connect their Xbox 360 to a computer running a compatible media sharing service, such as Windows Media Connect 2.0, Windows Media Center, Zune PC software with sharing, or PVConnect to access their own music from a network share within the game.

Lips is bundled with two motion-sensitive wireless microphones (one white, one black). A second player can seamlessly join in the currently playing song by picking up the microphone and shaking it. The microphones can also be used to perform gestures dictated by the game, plus the standard game controllers can also be used to add overlays such as hand-claps and crowd noise.

In February 2009, Microsoft released a title update for Lips. This patch addressed most of the issues with the game, namely, it introduced a new algorithm for voice recognition and vibrato pick-up, claiming that the game was 'too easy' before, and the ability to synchronise the microphone timing, a cause of regular negative feedback. This update also introduced the use of global leaderboards to track high scores. Minor tweaks were also made to the user interface.

Additionally, following the April 2009 title update, song packs were also introduced for purchase, offering bundles of songs for a discounted price.

As of October 2014, the store and server for Lips had been shut down.

== Wireless Microphone compatibility list ==
The games listed below support the Xbox 360 Wireless Microphones.

- Lips series:
  - Lips
  - Lips: Number One Hits
  - Lips: Canta en Español (Lips: Sing in Spanish)
  - Lips: Deutsche Partyknaller (Lips: German Party Songs)
  - Lips: Party Classics
  - Lips: I Love the 80's
- Guitar Hero series:
  - Guitar Hero: Metallica (with title update)
  - Guitar Hero Smash Hits
  - Guitar Hero 5 (up to four wired/wireless microphones supported at one time - a standard Xbox 360 controller is required for every microphone connected to use in-game)
  - Band Hero (up to four wired/wireless microphones supported at one time - a standard Xbox 360 controller is required for every microphone connected to use in-game)
  - Guitar Hero: Van Halen
  - Guitar Hero: Warriors of Rock
- Rock Band series:
  - Rock Band 2 (with title update)
  - The Beatles: Rock Band (up to three microphones supported at one time - only one standard Xbox 360 controller allowed)
  - Lego Rock Band
  - Green Day: Rock Band (up to three microphones supported at one time - only one standard Xbox 360 controller allowed)
  - Rock Band 3 (up to three microphones can be connected at one time - only one standard Xbox 360 controller allowed)
- DJ Hero series:
  - DJ Hero
  - DJ Hero 2
- Other:
  - Karaoke Revolution
  - Def Jam Rapstar
  - Michael Jackson: The Experience

== Reception ==
Reception

Aggregate score
Aggregator	Score
Metacritic	71/100

Review scores
Publication	Score
1Up.com	B+
The A.V. Club	B+
Edge	6/10
Eurogamer	5/10
Game Informer	7.5/10
GameDaily	7/10
GameSpot	6.5/10
GameSpy	3/5
GameZone	7/10
Giant Bomb	3/5
IGN	6.8/10
Official Xbox Magazine (US)	7.5/10
411Mania	7/10
Variety	(mixed)

Lips received "average" reviews according to the review aggregation website Metacritic. Reviewers praised the wireless microphones and multiplayer experience but criticized the single-player modes and the song import feature which many people had issues with. In addition, the import feature does not support lyric downloads but the game does make an attempt to reduce the real singer's voice volume while playing in this mode.

The A.V. Club gave the game a B+ and called it "A self-esteem booster for your tone-deaf friend, though the introduction of more content should help make it stay fun for everyone else." 411Mania gave it a score of seven out of ten, saying that it was "a mixed bag, but by far it is not a bad game. It's a decent game that is missing some of the key components that other games in this genre have." In contrast, Variety gave it a mixed review, saying that "Though it will quickly bore vocalists acclimated to the challenge of Rock Band, Lips excels as home karaoke, bringing style and pizzazz to a crowded genre. However, Lips is also exceedingly shallow, with a small number of songs and a broken system for importing new ones, meaning living room crooners will likely stick with Sony's deeper SingStar franchise for the time being."

== See also ==
- Guitar Hero series (starting with the 2008 release of Guitar Hero World Tour)
- Karaoke Revolution series
- Rock Band series
- SingStar
- UltraStar - An open source clone of the SingStar engine
