= Ryūta =

- Gender: Male

Origin
- Origin: Japanese
- Meaning: Different meanings depending on the kanji used

Ryūta, Ryuta or Ryuuta (written: 竜太, 隆太 or 龍太) is a masculine Japanese given name. Notable people with the name include:

== People ==
- Ryuta Hara (原 竜太; born 1981), Japanese footballer
- Ryuta Hayashi (林 隆太; born 1990), Japanese footballer
- Ryuta Homma (本間 隆太; born 1991), Japanese Volleyball player
- Iwakiyama Ryūta (岩木山 竜太; born 1976), Japanese sumo wrestler
- Ryuta Kanai (金井 隆太; born 1989), Japanese footballer
- Ryuta Kawashima (川島 隆太; born 1959), Japanese neuroscientist
- Ryuta Sasaki (佐々木 竜太; born 1988), Japanese footballer
- Ryuta Sato (佐藤 隆太; born 1980), Japanese actor and entertainer
- Ryuta Tasaki (田崎 竜太; born 1964), Japanese film director
- Toyohibiki Ryūta (豊響 隆太; born 1984), Japanese sumo wrestler
- Yamamotoyama Ryūta (山本山 龍太; born 1984), Japanese sumo wrestler

== Fictional characters ==
- Ryuta Saki (佐木 竜太), a character from The Kindaichi Case Files
- Ryuta Ippongi (一本木 龍太), a character from the Osu! Tatakae! Ouendan rhythm game duology
