= Lips: Number One Hits =

2009 video game

- Developer: iNiS
- Publisher: Microsoft Game Studios
- Designer: Keiichi Yano
- Platform: Xbox 360
- Release: NA: October 20, 2009; EU: October 23, 2009; AU: November 26, 2009
- Genre: Music / Rhythm
- Modes: Single-player, multiplayer

Lips: Number One Hits is a karaoke video game for the Xbox 360 console, and is the follow-up to the 2008 title Lips. Like its predecessor, the game was developed by iNiS and published by Microsoft Game Studios. It was released in 2009 and received generally average reviews. Spin-offs of the game have also been released, including Lips: Deutsche Partyknaller and Lips: Canta en Español.

Lips: Number One Hits features the use of motion-sensitive microphones, which are also compatible with other music video games such as The Beatles: Rock Band. The game is sold separately, and in packages including one or two microphones.

Each copy of Lips: Number One Hits included a redemption code for downloading one of three 5-song track packs for free.

== Gameplay ==
Number One Hits remains with the core of its patched predecessor, while offering some new features:

- Scoring has been enhanced to include a streak multiplier, much like Rock Band.
- Awardable achievements.
- Unlockable clothes and accessories for Xbox Live avatars.

== Soundtrack ==
The Lips: Number One Hits song list consists solely of songs that have reached the number one position on major global charts. In addition to this, players with a Lips save data on their hard drive will be able to select songs from the first game via a hot swapping feature. 40 master tracks are included on disc in Number One Hits. Coldplay's "Viva la Vida" is featured as this game's theme song.

Downloadable content for both games was cross-compatible between both Lips titles. Some Lips DLC didn't carry over Lips: Number One Hits.

== Reception ==
Reception

Aggregate score
Aggregator	Score
Metacritic	70/100

Review scores
Publication	Score
Eurogamer	5/10
GameZone	7/10
IGN	7.5/10
Official Xbox Magazine (UK)	8/10
Official Xbox Magazine (US)	7/10
TeamXbox	7.6/10

Lips: Number One Hits received "average" reviews according to the review aggregation website Metacritic. Reviewers noted great improvements in gameplay and scoring, such as the inclusion of avatars throughout the game, but was criticized for long menu load times, disc swapping between Lips titles, and the number of new achievements.

== Sequels ==
Following the release of Lips: Number One Hits, two additional titles were released specifically for European audiences. Lips: Deustche Partyknaller was released October 30, 2009 with 40 popular German language songs. Lips: Canta en Español was released November 13, 2009 with 35 Spanish language tracks.

Lips: Party Classics, offering 40 new tracks from karaoke venues, was released in Spring 2010.
