= Xbox Music Mixer =

- Developer: WildTangent
- Publisher: Microsoft Game Studios
- Platform: Xbox
- Release: NA: October 27, 2003; EU: November 28, 2003
- Genres: Family, Music, Utility
- Modes: Single-player, multiplayer

The Xbox Music Mixer is a multimedia utility developed by WildTangent and published by Microsoft Game Studios for the Xbox in 2003. The software allows the user to transfer certain types of music and pictures directly from a PC to the Xbox, create custom soundtracks, and features a karaoke mode to sing pre-loaded or custom songs using a packaged karaoke microphone. Xbox Music Mixer was announced at E3 in 2003 as part of a 'Digital Entertainment Lifestyle' initiative, with expectations that the software would lead the console towards functionality as an all-in-one media centre. Upon release, the software received negative reception, with reviewers observing compatibility and usability issues and limitations to the game's karaoke features. The software was subsequently influential to the features of the similar Windows Media Center Extender for the Xbox 360.

== Features ==
Screenshot from Xbox Music Mixer, displaying the interface and music visualisation features of the software.

The Xbox Music Mixer has several features that enhance the Xbox's multimedia capabilities. The primary feature of the software were media playback features, including music player that is able to play Audio CDs and .wma and .mp3 music files on the Xbox hard drive. Users are able to create custom playlists as a soundtrack. Playback includes options for an audio equalizer and 2D and 3D visualizers. Users are also able to record songs on an Audio CD to the hard drive using a record function. The Xbox Music Mixer also featured a slide show feature in which players could view .jpeg images imported from their computer. Users could import audio and image files from their computer using the Xbox Music Mixer PC Tool, external software that allowed users to transfer files using an Ethernet connection with the Xbox System Link Cable.

The Xbox Music Mixer is packaged with a karaoke mode in which players can sing along to 15 pre-packaged songs or songs on the player's hard drive or Audio CD. The feature took advantage of a karaoke microphone packaged with the software, connected to the console using the expansion slot, although players could also use an Xbox Communicator headset. The Songs included with the software, such as Love Shack and Y.M.C.A. featured on-screen lyrics, with the software supporting custom songs imported to the console which did not feature on-screen lyrics. Players are able to adjust the vocal feedback with various settings, including options to control the volume, reverb and chorus of microphone input. Performances can be recorded and saved to the console. More karaoke songs were purchasable from the Xbox Live service. Online support through Xbox Live was available for Xbox games until it was terminated on April 15, 2010. Xbox Music Mixer is now supported on Insignia, the replacement online servers for the Xbox.

== Development and release ==
Xbox Music Mixer was announced by Microsoft at E3 on May 12, 2003 as the first "non-game application" for the console. The announcement was part of the release of a series updates to the Xbox under the 'Digital Entertainment Lifestyle' brand, aimed at expanding the functionality of the console. The software was released amid high expectations that upgrades to the Xbox would pivot the console into a "media center...at the centre of home entertainment". Initial rumours were that the software would support video transfer, with Evan Shannon of GMR speculating upon the "enormous" implications of the software, stating "the promise of the all-in-one set-top box...is now truly on the brink of becoming a reality." These aspirations were encouraged by Microsoft executive Ed Fries, who stated the software would "unlock more of the entertainment potential of (the) Xbox" and "expand the definition of interactive entertainment". However, following release, this messaging was downplayed by executive Robbie Bach, who stated the advent of the Xbox Music Mixer would not shift the console to a home entertainment device, stating "it's not Xbox's role to be the centre of what we do in the living room". The Xbox Music Mixer was subsequently influential to the later development of the Windows Media Center Extender, which allowed Windows computers to stream media to the Xbox 360, with publications comparing the service to the functionality of the Xbox Music Mixer.

== Reception ==
Reception

Aggregate score
Aggregator	Score
Metacritic	49%

Review scores
Publication	Score
Eurogamer	2/10
GameSpy	30%
IGN	4.0

Xbox Music Mixer received "generally unfavorable" reviews according to the review aggregation website Metacritic, with an average score of 49% across 12 reviews. Several reviewers expressed disappointment in the software's usefulness as a media centre. Evan Shamoon of GMR stated the software was "a bit underwhelming at first glance", noting the "compatibility issues" with music file formats and Macintosh systems, limiting the software's capability of turning the Xbox into a "true home entertainment device". Similarly, Tom Bramwell of Eurogamer faulted the software's "obtuse" and "unhelpfully designed" user interface, faulting the game's "horrible list visuals, chunky buttons to press and a bizarre lack of widescreen support", stating "you're quickly reminded why PCs are better for organising huge numbers of disparate files than console applications." Similarly, Hilary Goldstein of IGN also critiqued the navigability of the software, stating whilst "some aspects of the interface are simple", "there's far too many areas in Mixer where nothing is labeled...that lack of easy identification is all over Music Mixer and turns it from an everyman machine into a complex device that requires a little dedication to learn."

Reviewers also critiqued the karaoke features of the software. Electronic Gaming Monthly found the game inferior to other console karaoke software such as Karaoke Revolution for the PlayStation 2, stating "Music Maker doesn't do much karaoke-wise that you can’t do just by playing a CD and singing along to it with a microphone. It's not a game — you're just singing along to your CDs with the vocal tracks ripped out." Justin Lee of GameSpy stated that the feature was "no fun", citing the low volume and delay of vocal feedback, stating "you end up sounding like you're mumbling randomly along with it." Lee also critiqued the included tracks, critiquing the inclusion of "duds" such as Auld Lang Syne. Hilary Goldstein of IGN also observed technical issues, stating "even with the music turned all the way down...my voice was still barely audible from the TV." Similarly, Tom Bramwell of Eurogamer stated the feature was a "poor offering" compared to karaoke machines, finding the limited number of tracks to be an "insult".
