= Karaoke Revolution (2003 video game) =

2003 video game

- Developer(s): Harmonix (PS2); Secret Level, Inc. (Xbox)
- Publisher(s): Konami
- Series: Karaoke Revolution
- Platform(s): PlayStation 2, Xbox
- Release: PlayStation 2: NA: November 5, 2003; EU: June 25, 2004; AU: March 31, 2005; Xbox: NA: November 9, 2004
- Genre(s): Music
- Mode(s): Single-player, multiplayer

Karaoke Revolution, known in the PAL region as Karaoke Stage, is a music video game developed by Harmonix and published by Konami for PlayStation 2 in 2003–2005. An Xbox port of the game was developed by Secret Level, Inc. and released in November 2004 featuring four more songs that were present in Karaoke Revolution Volume 2 and 10 exclusive Motown songs which are the original non-cover versions. The Xbox version also supported Xbox Live for downloads of more songs.

== Reception ==
Reception

Aggregate score
Aggregator	Score	
Aggregator	PS2	Xbox
Metacritic	83/100	80/100

Review scores
Publication	Score	
Publication	PS2	Xbox
1Up.com	N/A	B
Edge	6/10	N/A
Electronic Gaming Monthly	8.17/10 (Note: Two critics of Electronic Gaming Monthly gave the PlayStation 2 version each a score of 8.5/10, and the other gave it 7.5/10.)	N/A
Game Informer	8.5/10	7.75/10
GameRevolution	B+	N/A
GameSpot	7.5/10	7.6/10
GameSpy	4.5/5 stars	4/5 stars
GameZone	9/10	8.5/10
IGN	8.5/10	8.3/10
Official U.S. PlayStation Magazine	4/5 stars	N/A
Official Xbox Magazine (US)	N/A	8/10
X-Play	5/5 stars	N/A

The game received "favorable" reviews on both platforms according to the review aggregation website Metacritic. GamePro said that the PlayStation 2 version was "great fun, and you'll do well whether you're a closet pop star with a great voice or an average couch crooner with questionable talent." (Note: GamePro gave the PlayStation 2 version 3.5/5 for graphics, and three 4.5/5 scores for sound, control, and fun factor.)

IGN ranked the same console version as the 99th best PlayStation 2 game due to the involvement of Harmonix.
