= Moero! Nekketsu Rhythm Damashii Osu! Tatakae! Ouendan 2 =

2007 video game

Moero! Nekketsu Rhythm Damashii: Osu! Tatakae! Ouendan 2
- Developer: iNiS
- Publisher: Nintendo
- Designer: Keiichi Yano
- Engine: Osu! Tatakae! Ouendan engine
- Platform: Nintendo DS
- Release: JP: May 17, 2007
- Genre: Rhythm
- Modes: Single-player, multiplayer

Moero! Nekketsu Rhythm Damashii: Osu! Tatakae! Ouendan 2 (Note: Japanese: 燃えろ！熱血リズム魂 押忍！闘え！応援団２, Hepburn: Moero! Nekketsu Rizumu-damashii Osu! Tatakae! Ōendan Tsū lit. "Let's Go! Hot-Blooded Rhythm Spirit: Yeah! Fight! Cheer Squad 2") is a rhythm video game developed by iNiS and published by Nintendo for the Nintendo DS handheld video game console. It is the third of three rhythm games developed by iNiS for the DS, and is the sequel to Osu! Tatakae! Ouendan while incorporating many of the improvements in gameplay made in its international counterpart, Elite Beat Agents. The game has 4-player wireless play, supports the Nintendo DS Rumble Pak accessory, and was released in Japan on May 17, 2007.

== Storyline ==
Moero! Nekketsu Rhythm Damashii primarily follows the storyline from the original Osu! Tatakae! Ouendan, and is set roughly six years after the original game based on the game manual and the age differences of returning characters. Players act as the leader of a three-person cheerleading squad. Whenever someone is stressed out or backed into a corner, all they need to do is shout "Ouendan!" (Japanese for "Cheer Squad"). Then, the Ouendan appear (usually out of a place like a closet or waiting there while eating ramen) and use cheering and dance to help that someone through their troubles. The map of the territory that the Ouendan patrol within Moero! Nekketsu Rhythm Damashii is the same as that found in the original game, although it has been turned ninety degrees and is now rendered using 3D graphics.

The original Ouendan from the Yuuhi Town (signified by wearing their long gakuran jackets and for the Cheergirls, signified by wearing their blue cheer outfits) are still present in this game, cheering people on, but a new rival Ouendan from the Asahi Town appear that challenge the original Ouendan in skill and cheering (the "new" Ouendan are signified by their blue military-style outfits and for the Cheer Maidens, signified by wearing their modest scarlet cheer outfits). The individual stories are all unrelated, but characters featured in one stage may appear as background or supporting characters in another. One can also see characters from the first Ouendan game as lead, supporting or background characters, such as the pottery maker from the first game that appears as a guest at a hot springs, and gifts the hot springs family with new pottery work should the player be successful in the stage. In the final stage, broken into two parts like that of Agents, all of the characters in the game unite when the two Ouendan join together and once again lead the entire world in a cheer to save Earth when the sun's activity stops, plunging Earth into another ice age.

== Gameplay ==
As in the original game, this sequel is played almost entirely via touch screen (the only actual button used is the Start button for pausing the game). The player acts as the Ouendan, who cheer on the people that are in turmoil and shout out for them (the original "Black" Ouendan control the west side of that world, Yūhi Town, and the new "Blue" Ouendan control the east side, Asahi Town). The gameplay plays out identically to that found in the first Ouendan; the player must tap colored circles in precise time with the music in order to cheer the character through his or her problems. There are three types of marker:

- Hit Markers: These need to be tapped to the beat.
- Phrase Markers: When this is tapped, the stylus must be held down and follow a ball sliding along a track. If an arrow appears at the end of the track, the player must run the stylus back in the opposite direction.
- Spin Markers: At certain points, a large wheel appears. Players must spin the wheel by making circular motions on the screen (either direction will do). Once the required amount of spin has been cleared, further spinning will earn bonus points.

The top screen displays the stage's protagonist overcoming his or her dilemma. If the player's cheering is good, then the meter at the top of the touch screen stays in the yellow, and the character is seen triumphing over whatever it is holding him or her back. If the player's cheering is bad, then the meter on the top of the screen falls to the red and the character struggles. If the player's performance is particularly poor, the meter will hit the bottom and the mission will end in failure. Then, the player can either try again, quit to do something else, or review the last five seconds of gameplay up to where he or she lost.

At intervals in the song, the story progresses on the top screen. If the meter remains in the yellow, then the story will progress positively (scoring an "O") and if the meter is in the red, it will progress negatively (scoring an "X"). The number of Os and Xs given will determine the story's outcome from one of three possibilities: a good ending, which results in a special illustration, an average ending, or a bad ending. The final two levels do not adhere to this pattern.

Moero! Nekketsu Rhythm Damashii contains multiple enhancements over the original game, many of which were first featured in Elite Beat Agents. These features include the ability to save stage replay data and use it later in a "ghost versus" mode, 4-player wireless play, Rumble Pak compatibility, multiple stage endings depending on the player's performance, and the ability to skip intro and epilogue sections of each stage. Also, as the player earns new ranks by achieving cumulative high score totals across all stages and difficulties, three additional bonus stages are unlocked when specific ranks are earned.

Brand-new features that appeared in neither the first Ouendan game nor Agents include improvements to replay management, namely the removal of Elite Beat Agents' one replay per mission restriction, an increase of the replay storage limit from 19 to 20 and the inclusion of the option to delete individual replays (which can otherwise only be done with a drastic factory reset that erases all the others in Agents). Moreover, there is also an auto-revive feature exclusively on the easiest difficulty level that gives players two tries to finish any mission before the last two, allowing the player to immediately resume from one failure with about 60% of the spirit gauge filled. Unlike the first Ouendan game and Agents, the beatmaps of most missions (as opposed to few or none) on expert difficulty, which are usually mirrored beatmaps of the hard difficulty, have slightly different beat patterns or extra markers, causing expert mode to have a higher (or in some cases, lower) max combo count than that of hard mode. It is also possible to unlock a mode in which the game's timer circles/markers are disabled, forcing the player to hit the markers with only the rhythm of the music as a guide. On the Kigaru ni Ōen mode, only the timer circles are missing. On all other difficulty levels, the whole marker disappears, and as the player moves up the difficulty levels, the markers disappear faster. The game also records the top three scores of each mission and includes an unlockable gallery featuring various pictures of the two teams unlocked each time a specific player rank is reached, the "best ending" of a mission is earned for the first time or a new act in the campaign is unlocked. The multiplayer mode has also been upgraded, as players are now allowed to use the male cheerleaders on the expert Karei ni Ōen mode. They retain their male animations, except their dancing corresponds to the positioning of the Very Hard markers. Likewise, the player is allowed to use a Cheer Girl on the easier difficulties, retaining the female moves, but the dances correspond to the male markers. As well as being able to skip song intros, players can now skip the ending sequence of songs they have previously completed.

=== Elite Beat Agents mode ===
Between June 28 and July 11, 2007, players could use a Japanese DS Download Station to unlock downloadable content based on Elite Beat Agents, which can also be achieved with a cheat device, such as Action Replay. It consists of skins of the Elite Beat Agents and Elite Beat Divas for the 3-D models of dancing Ouendan on the touch screen, as well as two new multiplayer characters, Agent J and the Ramen Shop Cat in the first Ouendan game, the former which is used in the campaign and is toggled on or off when selecting its difficulty level. In the campaign's penultimate mission, the Agents skins are only applied on the Yuuhi Town Ouendan for the first phase, then when the Asahi Town Ouendan take over for the remaining two phases, the leader is replaced by the Ramen Shop Cat, who sports their hairstyle while their backup dancers remain unchanged. The cat would continue to represent the Asahi Town Ouendan leader for the final mission that follows, which is performed simultaneously with the Yuuhi Town Ouendan leader, who is replaced with their equivalent Elite Beat Agents leader. (Note: The Kigaru ni Ōen leader Hajime Tanaka is replaced by Agent Spin, the Kakan ni Ōen leader Ryuuta Ippongi is replaced by Agent J, the Gekiretsu ni Ōen leader Kai Doumeki is replaced by Agent Chieftain and the Karei ni Ōen leader Sayaka Amemiya is replaced by Agent Starr, leader of the Elite Beat Divas.) The Elite Beat Agents skins have the same animation as the Ouendan they replace, but the Agents keep their right hands closed to hold their signature microphones. In keeping the "wall of fire" visual effect that occurs during long combos while the character skins are used, Ouendan 2 finally grants players the experience of seeing Agents characters perform in front of a wall of fire, a feature that was otherwise omitted from the final release of Agents after being present in its earlier E3 demo builds.

== Track list ==
Moero! Nekketsu Rhythm Damashii features 19 tracks in total, most of which are cover versions. The following track list is organized by the order in which they are unlocked, the original artist of the song and the name of the song.

Bold - denotes that the track is performed by the original artist.

1. Sukima Switch - "Zenryoku Shōnen" (Note: Japanese: 全力少年; lit. "Full-powered Boy")
2. Kaela Kimura - "Rirura Riruha" (Note: Japanese: リルラ リルハ; an abbreviation of "Real Life Real Heart") (Note: Available in single-card multiplayer.)
3. FLOW - "Okuru Kotoba" (Note: Japanese: 贈る言葉; lit. "Words to Give You")
4. Ken Hirai - "Pop Star"
5. Hitomi Yaida - "Go My Way"
6. The Checkers - "Julia ni Heartbreak" (Note: Japanese: ジュリアに傷心, Hepburn: Juria ni Shōshin lit. "Heartbroken for Julia")
7. **Going Under Ground - "VISTA"**
8. Home Made Kazoku - "Shōnen Heart" (Note: Japanese: 少年ハート, Hepburn: Shōnen Hāto lit. "Boyish Heart")
9. mihimaru GT - "Kibun Jōjō ↑↑" (Note: Japanese: 気分上々↑↑; lit. "Best Feeling")
10. Tomoyasu Hotei - "Bambina" (Note: Japanese: バンビーナ, Hepburn: Banbīna)
11. SMAP - "Bang! Bang! Vacances!" (Note: Japanese: BANG! BANG! バカンス!, Hepburn: BANG! BANG! Bakansu! "vacances" being the French word for "vacation")
12. Ai - "Believe"
13. Kishidan - "Zoku" (Note: Japanese: 族; literally "Family")
14. Porno Graffitti - "Music Hour" (Note: Japanese: ミュージック・アワー, Hepburn: Myūjikku Awā)
15. HYDE - "Countdown"
16. Sambomaster - "Sekai wa Sore o Ai to Yobundaze" (Note: Japanese: 世界はそれを愛と呼ぶんだぜ; lit. "That's What the World Calls Love!")

The following three tracks are unlockable within the course of the game by achieving cumulative high scores across all difficulty levels and stages. As certain high score totals are reached, the player will move up in rank, and by achieving certain ranks, a bonus stage and track is unlocked. When these levels are unlocked before completing some of the difficulties, they become available in a particular act in the game's main campaign and must be completed along with the other songs in that act to advance to the next act. In the order in which they are unlocked, they are:

1. Orange Range - "Monkey Magic"
2. Nana starring Mika Nakashima - "Glamorous Sky"
3. **ZZ** - **"Samurai Blue"** (Note: Japanese: サムライブルー, Hepburn: Samurai Burū)[lower-alpha 13]

=== Track-specific notes ===
- The "Bang! Bang! Vacances!" track is covered by a female group, while the original artist, SMAP, is a male group.
- Orange Range's "Monkey Magic" is a re-released track, originally done by Godiego, from the intro to the 1979 TV series Saiyūki, dubbed into English as Monkey. In the UK, the BBC released the original "Monkey Magic" by Godiego on vinyl in 1980.
- FLOW's "Okuru Kotoba" is a rock cover of a well-known Japanese folk single released in 1979 by Kaientai. The original version was a huge hit in Japan, and is often sung at school graduations.
- "GLAMOROUS SKY" is the main theme song to the live-action film NANA based on the hit manga. Mika Nakashima played a musician and main character Nana Osaki in the film.
- "Shonen Heart" is the second opening theme to the anime Eureka Seven.

== Development ==
While at Game Developer Conference 2007 in San Francisco, Keiichi Yano, creator of the original Ouendan and Agents, stated that iNiS wanted a sequel to Ouendan to respond to various issues that players have discussed online about the former, while also deciding to add the option to hide the timer circles to offer a new challenge to hardcore, veteran players. He also explained that game's unusually long title was meant to fascinate players with an amalgamation of words from unspecified prior games in iNiS' development history and cryptically hinted that there will be secret playable characters, which were later revealed to be the Elite Beat Agents and the ramen shop cat from the first game, available in the free above mentioned "EBA mode" DLC pack at Japanese DS Download Stations the following summer, in addition to a rival ouendan team. A cover version of "Bang! Bang Vacances!" that utilized male vocals was originally planned to be used for a level, but due to licensing issues, the song was redone with female vocals. Despite Nintendo's penchant for censorship, the developers were also surprised to see the publisher allowing the beginning of a particular level on expert difficulty to show lead Cheergirl Sayaka Ameimiya skinny-dipping in hot springs, with the gap between the two DS screens obstructing her chest.

== Future ==
=== Unproduced sequel ===
Years after the release of Ouendan 2, video game historian Liam Robertson revealed in a video documentary that iNiS approached Nintendo to discuss the possibility of making a third Ouendan game for the Nintendo 3DS, but Nintendo declined to green-light it, citing concerns about the sales of future games.

=== Other appearances ===
The leaders of the Kakan ni Ōen difficulty, Ryuuta Ippongi and Hayato Saoniji, appear as a single trophy in Super Smash Bros. Brawl, released the following year.
