= Hungry Lucy =

American dark wave and trip hop duo

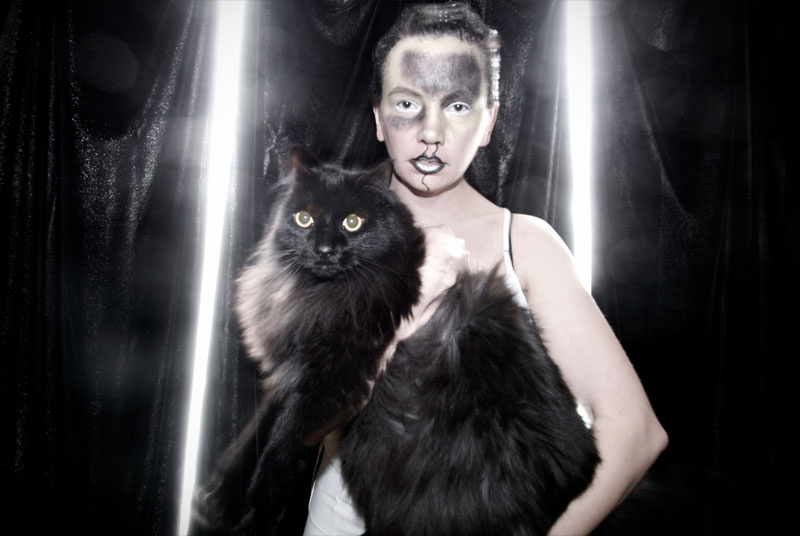
- Christa Belle of Hungry Lucy in a publicity photo for Pulse of the Earth

Background information
- Origin: Cincinnati, Ohio
- Genres: Dark wave, trip hop
- Years active: 1998–2014
- Labels: Alfa Matrix, Fishtank Soundworks, Hungry Lucy Music
- Members: Christa Belle; Warren Harrison
- Website: http://www.hungrylucy.com

Hungry Lucy was a dark wave and trip hop duo with a female vocalist. Beginning in 1998, they released four full-length CDs on Alfa Matrix in Europe (including EU only 2-CD boxset versions) and on Hungry Media for the US. Led by Christa Belle (lyrics, vocals, music) and Warren Harrison (music, programming and production), the two came together when Harrison was asked to contribute to a Depeche Mode tribute album in 1998.

Hungry Lucy is included in numerous compilation releases, including Elektrauma 5 from Triton Records in 1999, The Ultimate Electro-Industrial Compilation from Alfa Matrix in 2002, and Noir - Smooth Female Trip Hop from Dancing Ferret Discs in 2003. In 2005, To Kill a King debuted at #9 on the French Alternative Charts, and the radio show Echoes from Public Radio International, hosted by John Diliberto, featured Hungry Lucy with that debut. The limited release EP, "Reigndance" reached #1 on the Dutch Underground Singles chart.

The name "Hungry Lucy" refers to a young woman named Lucy Ryan who died in 1792. According to the ghost story of Havoc House, Psychic Sybil Leek is claimed to have channeled Ryan, and reported that Ryan was constantly complaining about being hungry.

== Discography ==
"Pulse of the Earth"
"Pulse of the Earth", track 2 of Hungry Lucy's 2010 Pulse of the Earth

- Apparitions (2000)
- Glō (2003)
- To Kill a King (2004)
- Before We Stand ... We Crawl (EP, 2006)
- The Teatime Sessions (Live, 2008)
- Pulse of the Earth (2010)
