= Boogie (video game) =

2007 video game by EA

- North American Wii cover
- Developer: EA Montreal
- Publisher: Electronic Arts
- Platforms: Wii, PlayStation 2, Nintendo DS
- Release: Wii: NA: August 7, 2007; AU: August 30, 2007; EU: August 31, 2007; PlayStation 2: NA: November 15, 2007; AU: November 22, 2007; EU: November 30, 2007; Nintendo DS: NA/AU: November 29, 2007; EU: November 30, 2007
- Genre: Music
- Modes: Single-player, multiplayer

Boogie is a music video game developed by Electronic Arts for the Wii, PlayStation 2 and Nintendo DS. Being touted as a party-game, it enables players to create their character, then use the Wii Remote and a microphone to sing and dance through it. Each song within the game can be performed either as a karaoke or as a dancing game. The game is based around an alien theme. It was one of the first games released in Brazil for the Wii. Although anticipation was high for the game, it received mixed reviews.

The game was followed by a sequel, Boogie Superstar, in 2008.

== Gameplay ==
In-game screenshot of Boogie

The karaoke gameplay is similar to other singing games such as SingStar and Karaoke Revolution. The game comes packaged with a USB microphone. To score, the player must sing in time and in tune with the lyrics as they scroll at the bottom of the screen, with a musical staff to indicate the correct pitch and where the player's current pitch is. Rather than using phonetic detection, the game bases the score on how well the player matches the rhythm and pitch.

The dancing portion uses the Playstation 2 controller, or the Wii Remote and optionally the Nunchuk attachment. As the song plays, the player must move the remote left, right, down or up in time with the beat of the song to earn points. Like EA's SSX games, repeating the same movements will reduce the player's score, so the player must continually string together different orders of movements, as well as change the dancing style. A "boogie meter" fills with successful dance steps and strings of dance steps. While filled, the player can attempt a special dance move by holding down a button on the controller and then following the exact order of steps (4 to 6 steps long) that comes up. Successful execution of these steps in order and in time with the music will perform that move, while failure will detract some of the boogie meter. The player can move about the dance floor, picking up tokens, score multipliers, and boogie meter boosts when they appear. If the Nunchuk is used (for the Wii version), the player will be given special solo sections where they can control the character's facial expression while a phrase of music goes by. Additionally, the user can enter a "Strike a Pose" mode, requiring them to tilt the Nunchuk or move the analog sticks to have the on-screen character point at an ever-decreasing set of targets for additional points. While the player can also use the basic dancing controls in karaoke mode, these do not affect the score there.

During the story mode, covering five chapters for each of the five characters in the game, the player can only advance after achieving a minimum score on the game. In regular play mode, their score is rated against pre-set scores for performances, and are rewarded with tokens for how good the performance was. Tokens can be used in the in-game store to unlock additional songs, stages, and outfits for character customization.

Players have the ability to create music videos of regular performances, which can include switching camera positions and adding screen effects.

Boogie features competitive and cooperative local multiplayer modes.

== Track listing ==
The game has 39 songs and all songs are covers of the original tracks.

Song	Artist	Year
"ABC"	The Jackson 5	1970
"Baila Me"	Gipsy Kings	1981
"Boogie Oogie Oogie"	A Taste of Honey	1978
"Brick House"	Commodores	1977
"Canned Heat"	Jamiroquai	1999
"Celebration"	Kool & the Gang	1980
"Dancing in the Street"	Martha and the Vandellas	1964
"Dancing Machine"	The Jackson 5	1974
"Don't Cha"	The Pussycat Dolls featuring Busta Rhymes	2004
"Fergalicious"	Fergie featuring will.i.am	2006
"Get Right"	Jennifer Lopez	2005
"Get the Party Started"	P!nk	2001
"Girls Just Want to Have Fun"	Cyndi Lauper	1983
"Groove Is in the Heart"	Deee-Lite	1990
"I Want You Back"	The Jackson 5	1969
"I'm a Slave 4 U"	Britney Spears	2001
"It's Raining Men"	The Weather Girls	1982
"Karma Chameleon"	Culture Club	1983
"Kung Fu Fighting"	Carl Douglas	1974
"Le Freak"	Chic	1978
"Let's Get It Started"	Black Eyed Peas	2004
"Love Rollercoaster"	Red Hot Chili Peppers	1996
"Love Shack"	The B-52's	1989
"Mambo No. 5 (A Little Bit of...)"	Lou Bega	1999
"Milkshake"	Kelis	2003
"One More Time"	Daft Punk	2000
"One Way or Another"	Blondie	1979
"Oops!... I Did It Again"	Britney Spears	2000
"Pop Muzik"	M	1979
"SOS"	Rihanna	2006
"Stars"	Simply Red	1991
"That's the Way (I Like It)"	KC and the Sunshine Band	1975
"Tú y Yo"	Thalía	2002
"U Can't Touch This"	MC Hammer	1990
"Virtual Insanity"	Jamiroquai	1996
"Walking on Sunshine"	Katrina and the Waves	1985
"We Are Family"	Sister Sledge	1979
"Y.M.C.A."	Village People	1978

== Reception ==
Reception

Aggregate scores
Aggregator	Score		
Aggregator	DS	PS2	Wii
GameRankings	60%	50%	59%
Metacritic	58/100	52/100	57/100

Review scores
Publication	Score		
Publication	DS	PS2	Wii
1Up.com			3.0/10
G4			1/5
Game Informer			7.75/10
GamePro			4.0/5
GameSpot			5.5/10
IGN	5.5/10		4.5/10
Nintendo Power	7.0/10		5.5/10
Official Nintendo Magazine			81%
PlayStation Official Magazine – UK		5.0/10	

Despite positive early reviews from the Official Nintendo Magazine and GamePro, who gave it an 81% and a 4 out of 5 respectively, and also from Game Informer, which gave it a 7.75 out of 10, Boogie received divided reviews. 1UP.com gave it a 3 out of 10, saying it was fun for only 20 minutes and criticizing the shallow gameplay. GameSpot likewise gave it a 5.5 out of 10, citing that the karaoke does not work right (e.g., if the players make any wrong noise it would give them full points) and that the single player mode was "flat-out lame". IGN gave Boogie a 4.5 out of 10, complaining about oversimplified controls and the whole control system in general. Nevertheless, IGN also stated that they would like to see a sequel with a much more solid gameplay since Boogie had potential. They gave the DS version a 5.5/10, calling it "not much deeper than its console counterpart" and "completely unfulfilling". Nintendo Power gave it a 5.5 out of 10, saying that the game's difficulty was much too easy. They gave the DS version a 7.0, though, saying it was more difficult. PlayStation Official Magazine UK gave the PlayStation 2 version a 5.0/10. X-Play gave Boogie a 1 out of 5 because it "lacks a challenge" and that the metronomes from both the Wii Remote and the TV speakers were out of sync, and they didn't know which metronome beat they were supposed to follow.

Boogie currently holds a 59% ranking for the Wii, a 60% for the Nintendo DS, and a 50% for the PS2 on GameRankings, while Metacritic currently gives the game a 57 (Wii), a 58 (DS), and a 52 (PS2) out of 100.

== See also ==
- List of Wii games
