= Liona Interactive =

Japanese video game developer

LIONA Interactive 株式会社LIONA
- Formerly: iNiS Ltd. (1997-2000) iNiS Corporation (2000-2016); Spica (2017) inisJ Corporation (2016-2020); LIONA Interactive (2020-)
- Company type: Private
- Industry: Video games
- Founded: February 3, 1997; 29 years ago Tokyo, Japan
- Headquarters: Naka Meguro, Tokyo, Japan
- Key people: Masako Harada (CEO); Keiichi Yano (COO); Takahide Hoshino (CFO)
- Products: Gitaroo Man; Elite Beat Agents
- Website: https://www.liona.co.jp/

LIONA Interactive (株式会社LIONA) (formerly known as iNiS Corporation (株式会社イニス, Inisu)) is a Japanese video game developer based in Tokyo, specializing in rhythm games and digital content. It was founded as iNiS Ltd. (an acronym derived from "infinite Noise of the inner Soul") on February 3, 1997 by Keiichi Yano. After iNiS Corporation (2000–2016) briefly rebranded as Spica in 2017 (which soon went bankrupt), a successor company inisJ (established 2016) adopted the current name in 2020.

Throughout its history, Liona Interactive has developed notable rhythm and music titles such as Gitaroo Man (2001), Elite Beat Agents (2006), and the Lips series (2008–2010), alongside game engines like nFactor2 and MixJuice for platforms including Nintendo DS, Xbox 360, and PlayStation Portable. The company has expanded into mobile, arcade, and VR games, with projects like Evangelion Battlefields (2020–2023), Tetote Connect (2021), and Monsoni! (2024).

== Subsidiaries ==
- SONICA Co., Ltd.: Established in 2001, it is a provider of sound solutions.

== Titles developed ==
=== CD/DVD-ROM ===
Title	Platform	Release date
Penguin Piano	?	October 1997
Space Battleship Yamato Master Edition CD-ROM	Windows/Mac OS hybrid	March 20, 1999
Space Battleship Yamato Master Edition DVD-ROM	DVD player	?
Picasso	?	?(1997–2000)
Safari Tokyo	Windows	October 1998
Kiseki No Maya Uranai	?	April 1998
Minna no Tabetaku Ver.2	?	October 1999
Roland VP-9000 promo CD-ROM	?(CD-ROM)	February 2000

=== Video games ===
Title	Platform	Release date
beatmania Da!!	Windows/Mac OS hybrid	February 17, 2000
beatmania BEST Da!!	Windows/Mac OS hybrid	September 28, 2000, July 5, 2002(rerelease)
pop'n music Da!!	Windows/Mac OS hybrid	September 28, 2000, September 6, 2002(rerelease)
Gitaroo Man	PlayStation 2	June 21, 2001
Gundam Pilot Academy	Arcade	2002
Osu! Tatakae! Ouendan	Nintendo DS	July 28, 2005
Gitaroo Man Lives!	PlayStation Portable	June 8, 2006
Rain Wonder Trip	PlayStation Portable	July 6, 2006
Elite Beat Agents	Nintendo DS	November 6, 2006
Moero! Nekketsu Rhythm Damashii Osu! Tatakae! Ouendan 2	Nintendo DS	May 17, 2007
Anata mo DS de Classic Kiite Mimasenka?	Nintendo DS	July 5, 2007
Lips	Xbox 360	November 18, 2008
Lips: Number One Hits	Xbox 360	October 20, 2009
Lips: Canta en Español	Xbox 360	November 13, 2009
Lips: Deutsche Partyknaller	Xbox 360	2009
Lips: Party Classics	Xbox 360	February 26, 2010
Lips: I ♥ The 80's	Xbox 360	April 2, 2010
The Black Eyed Peas Experience	Xbox 360	November 8, 2011
Infinity Blade Cross	iOS	February 20, 2012
Anata Toshokan	iOS, Android	May 19, 2012 (iOS), May 25, 2012 (Android)
Demons’ Score	iOS, Android	September 19, 2012
Symphonica	iOS	October 18, 2012
The Hip Hop Dance Experience	Wii, Xbox 360	November 13, 2012
Karaoke	Xbox 360	December 11, 2012
Eden to Green	Android, iOS	April 8, 2013
Initial D Perfect Shift Online	Nintendo 3DS	April 2, 2014
Just Sing	PlayStation 4, Xbox One	September 6, 2016
Project Rap Rabbit (co-developed with NanaOn-Sha)	PlayStation 4, Microsoft Windows	Cancelled

=== Web design ===
Title	Platform	Release date
Shockwave Christmas Card (Dreamarts)	?	?

=== Prototype titles ===
Title	Platform	Release date
MixJuice	Xbox	1999
Minpan	?	2002
Ace Trekkers	?	2002
Pugi Pugi (tentative)	?	2004
Yosei no Sumu Mori	Xbox 360	2005

=== Engines ===
- FUEL audio library (for ACID)
- nFactor2 (next-generation rendering engine - Wii, Xbox 360, PC only)
- MixJuice (interactive music engine)
- Unreal Engine 3
- Unreal Engine 4
- Unity

== Awards ==
- IGN's Best Nintendo DS developer of 2006
