= Lips: Canta en Español =

2009 video game

- Developer(s): iNiS
- Publisher(s): Microsoft Game Studios
- Platform(s): Xbox 360
- Release: November 13, 2009
- Genre(s): Music / Rhythm
- Mode(s): Single-player, multiplayer

Lips: Canta en Español (Lips: Sing in Spanish) is a karaoke video game for the Xbox 360 console, released in Spain as a follow-up to the 2008 title Lips.

It was recently released in Colombia as the first officially available follow-up to the first Lips game.

It is unknown at this time whether or not Lips: Canta en Español will be released in other Spanish speaking countries.

== Soundtrack ==
Unlike the first game which featured a regionalized soundtrack with very few songs in Spanish, the music of Canta en Español is entirely in that language.

Downloadable content from other Lips titles works with Canta en Español, and a disc swapping feature is available that allows to play songs from other Lips discs without exiting the game.
