= Osu! Tatakae! Ouendan =

Rhythm video game

- Developer: iNiS Corporation
- Publisher: Nintendo
- Director: Keiichi Yano
- Designer: Keiichi Yano
- Artist: Kotaro Umeji
- Platform: Nintendo DS
- Release: JP: July 28, 2005
- Genre: Music video game
- Modes: Single-player, multiplayer

Osu! Tatakae! Ouendan, (Note: Japanese: 押忍！闘え！応援団, Hepburn: Osu! Tatakae! Ōendan lit. "Go! Fight! Cheer Squad") or Ouendan, is a rhythm video game developed by iNiS and published by Nintendo for the Nintendo DS handheld game console in 2005, for release only in Japan. Ouendan stars a cheer squad rhythmically cheering for various troubled people, presented in-game in the style of a manga comic. In each stage, players use the DS touchscreen to tap specifically marked spots that appear in rhythm to various Japanese pop songs, scoring points for accurate timing and avoiding a poor performance which can cause the stage to end prematurely. Though never released in Western markets, it was a popular import to these regions, leading to the development of the Westernized Elite Beat Agents, as well as a Japan-only sequel Moero! Nekketsu Rhythm Damashii Osu! Tatakae! Ouendan 2.

== Gameplay ==
Each level of Ouendan features a plot line accompanied by a specific song. A character (or characters) facing a problem will cry Ouendan! (Note: Japanese: 応援団) when their conflict reaches a climax. This call summons the cheer squad, and the song starts. During the game, the story is told on the Nintendo DS's top screen, and gameplay takes place on the touch screen. The player uses the Nintendo DS's stylus to perform varying actions according to the markers that appear on screen:

Marker	Description
Hit Markers	Numbered circles that must be tapped in sequence in time with the music.
Slide Markers	Markers with tracks extending from them. The player must trace the stylus in time with a ball rolling on the track and may be required to move back and forth across the track several times.
Spin Markers	A spinner that the player must rotate quickly until bars along the sides of the screen are filled. The speed at which they must be spun depends on the tempo of the music and difficulty of the song. If the player has time to continue spinning the marker after filling the gauge, bonus points are awarded for each continued rotation. The positions of Spin Markers are constant across all difficulty levels.

Depending on how precise the player's actions are, they will be awarded 50, 100, or 300 points. There is a health meter that indicates the character or characters' fighting spirit, or kiai, that constantly drains over the course of the song, but can be refilled with hitting the indicated beats; the more precise the player is, the more energy is restored. If the player should tap a marker too early or miss a beat completely, the meter will deplete even further. If the life bar should empty, the level will end, resulting in failure for the character. To advance in the game, each stage must be completed successfully. The game saves progress automatically once a stage has been completed. After a successful completion of a mission, players are given a letter grade rank of S, A, B, C or D, depending on the breakdown of scores of individual markers (the best grade, S, requires all markers to be played, with at least 90% of them to be scored 300 and no more than 1% of them to be scored 50).

Each level is divided into four phases (although some levels last five phases, such as the first one), and at the end of each one before the last, there is a junction point where the player can take a rest while a scene from the story plays out on the top screen. If the life meter is at least fifty percent filled and in the yellow, the scene will depict a positive result such as, in the case of the pottery maker, gaining great inspiration for a new work. If the life meter is less than fifty percent full and in the red, the resulting scene will depict the character encountering a setback, such as the pottery master coming up with yet another drab creation.

The score for each level is based on the timing of the beats (including individual small portions of phrase markers), and the current number of beats made in a row, which increases a combo multiplier by 1x each time. Thus, for example, after completing 50 beats in a row successfully, the multiplier will be at 50x. After completing any song, the player can go back and attempt to improve the score for that song. Additionally, as a combo grows, flames will appear behind the cheer squad, and the longer the combo is maintained, the taller the flames will rise until reaching the top of the touch screen. The flames will disappear completely if the combo is broken. The use of flames is constant throughout the game to represent the protagonist's determination. Maintaining long and full combos is key to earning high scores, as the game's save data will only remember the rank of a mission completion with the highest score.

There are four difficulty levels in the game. Initially, only Easy mode (Note: Japanese: 気軽, Hepburn: kigaru lit. "light-heartedly cheer") (Hajime Tanaka) and Normal mode (Note: Japanese: 果敢, Hepburn: kakan lit. "boldly cheer") (Ryuuta Ippongi) are available, but completing Normal mode will unlock Hard mode, (Note: Japanese: 激烈, Hepburn: gekiretsu lit. "fervently cheer") and completing Hard mode (Kai Domeki) will unlock Expert/Insane mode (Sayaka Amemiya and the Cheergirls). (Note: Japanese: 華麗, Hepburn: karei lit. "gracefully cheer") Each mode uses a different cheer team leader, with the exception of Expert/Insane Mode, which changes the whole team into a team of 3 cheerleader girls (Sayaka serves as the leader of the Cheergirls, while Aoi Kanda and Anna Lindhurst serve as the backup Cheergirls) who appear more American.

Increasing the difficulty level generally increases the number of markers to hit, the rate at which markers appear, and the rate at which the life bar depletes. Expert mode is basically Hard mode rotated 180 degrees, with markers being smaller and appearing faster, thus allowing less response time. There are subtle differences, however, such as extra markers for short double beats and different, more complex beats for some songs. While the maximum combo for a mission on Expert is typically identical to that of Hard, there are three particular missions where Expert mode's max combo count is higher than that of Hard.

The game's main campaign comprises 15 missions, each assigned to a different song. Missions are also grouped into one of seven acts; in acts containing multiple missions, players can choose the order in which they complete missions in the current act, but must complete all missions in an act before moving on to the next act.

== Plot ==
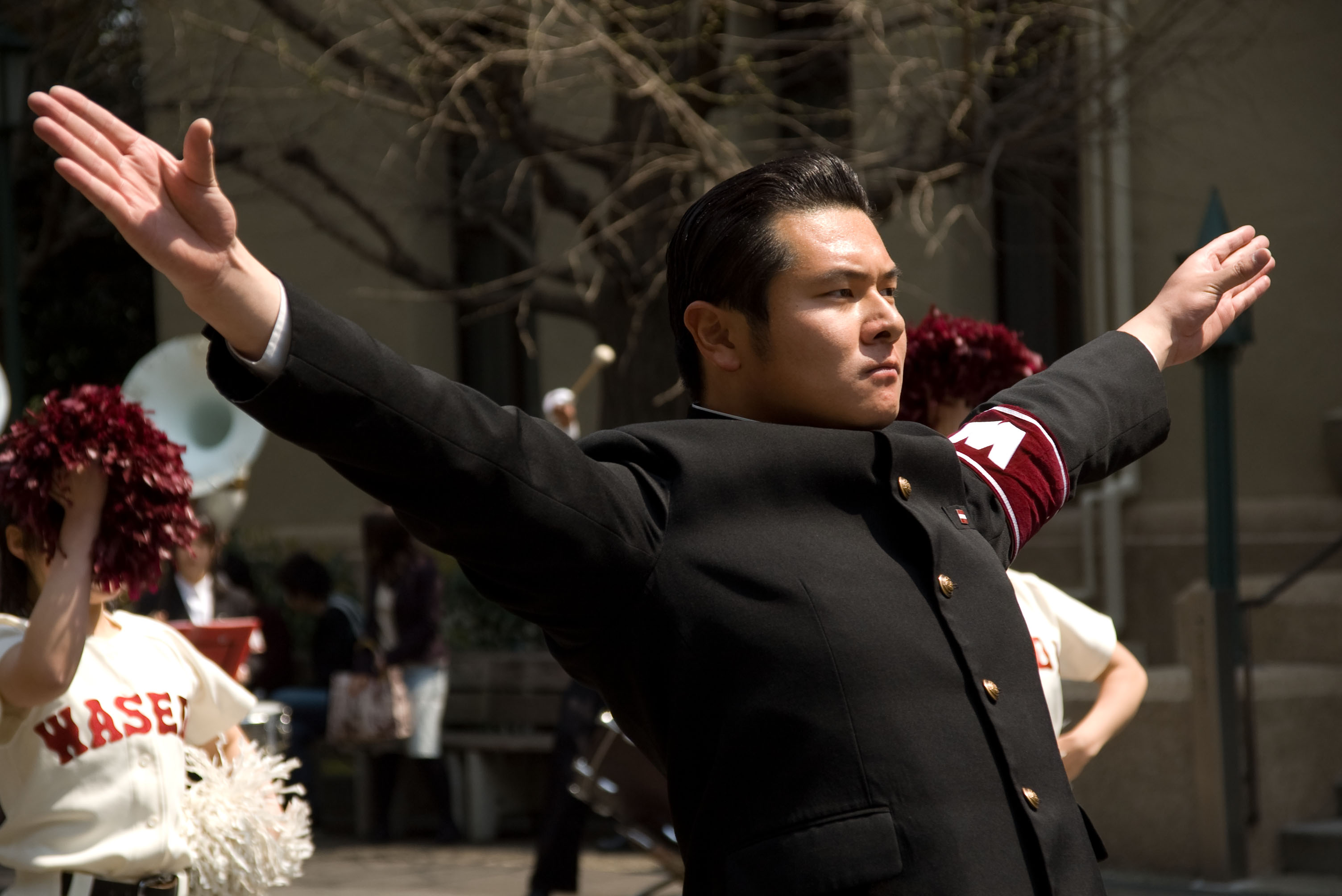
The Ouendan are a cheer squad, wearing distinctive black gaku-ran Japanese school uniforms with red armbands.

Ouendan details the plight of several characters in hopeless situations who cry out for help. In response, the Ouendan, an all-male cheer squad or an all-female Cheerleader group appear to help each character work through their problems by cheering them through music. The origin of the Ouendan is unexplained in the game, though they are always nearby when help is needed. The Ouendan appear wearing highly stylized black uniforms (based on gaku-ran Japanese school uniforms) with red armbands (for the Cheergirls, blue cheerleader outfits with long sleeves), a common sight at Japanese school sporting events.

Most of the scenarios are inspired by modern Japanese culture, or are heavily influenced by the Japanese form of print comics, or manga. For instance, the first stage features a high school student distracted from studying for his college entrance exams by his family, while a later stage focuses on a pottery master who has lost the inspiration to create unique works. Most of the stories are presented in a light-hearted or comical fashion, emphasized by absurd storyline twists and the sounds of whistles and cheer shouts as the player progresses through each stage. The one notable exception to this is a love story set to the Hitomi Yaida song "Over the Distance", which is told in a more heartfelt, subdued tone further marked by the gameplay's whistle sound effect being replaced with subtle chimes in the song's first phase and the initial loud countdown not being used.

While the individual stories otherwise have no connecting theme to them, characters from some stories reappear in others as background figures or supporting characters, but all of the characters reappear in the final story, in which the Ouendan must lead the entire world in a cheer to save Earth from being destroyed by an asteroid.

== Development ==
At the 2007 Game Developers Conference in San Francisco, iNiS Vice President Keiichi Yano described the process which eventually resulted in Osu! Tatakae! Ouendan. His first inspirations for the game came when he first tried a Nintendo DS handheld, and development on the game began after successfully pitching the concept to Nintendo. At the conference, he also displayed early concept art for lead Ouendan character Ryūta Ippongi, who originally wore the shirt of his gaku-ran uniform unbuttoned and had a significantly shorter hairstyle. Yano noted that Nintendo was fond of the characters due to their manga-style aesthetic.

Yano also displayed an unused Ouendan stage from a prototype build that featured a puppy in danger. The stage concept was ultimately dropped from the final version of the game because the puppy died if the player failed the stage.

The music used in Ouendan consists of hit songs by well-known J-pop artists. The majority are taken from the mid-to-late 1990s and early 2000s, though The Blue Hearts' "Linda Linda" and Linda Yamamoto's "Neraiuchi" date from 1987 and 1973, respectively. All of the recordings featured in the game, besides 175R's "Melody" (which also plays over the game's end credits) are covers, rather than recordings by the original artists.

== Reception ==
Some news sources, such as GameCentral on Channel 4's Teletext service in the UK, gave it positive coverage, leading to the game becoming something of a cult hit among gamers who were prepared to import it.

In December 2006, Press Start Online placed Ouendan at number one in their HeartScore list, a top 25 of underappreciated games and personal favorites.

In a review for Retro Gamer, Darran Jones considered the game a future classic, and noted that while it lacks some of the features in its sequel and Elite Beat Agents, he felt that it had a better mix of songs and more personality compared to its peers. He also described the difficulty as "challenging, but never unfair".

== Legacy and sequel ==
Following high import sales for Ouendan, Nintendo and iNiS developed Elite Beat Agents, released in North America in November 2006, and in 2007 for other markets. The game features the same gameplay as Ouendan, but with scenarios, characters and songlists geared towards western audiences, replacing the male cheerleaders with special agents. Several general gameplay improvements were made as well.

A true sequel to the game, Moero! Nekketsu Rhythm Damashii Osu! Tatakae! Ouendan 2, was released on May 17, 2007. The game features the original characters from Osu! Tatakae! Ouendan, as well as a new rival cheer group that the player both encounters and plays as. It has 4-player wireless play, as well as several other new features, most of which were first implemented in Elite Beat Agents.

osu!, an indie game inspired by Osu! Tatakae! Ouendan, was released for personal computers in the same year the sequel was released.

The main characters of Ouendan also made minor appearances in Nintendo's crossover fighting series Super Smash Bros., appearing as stickers and trophies in Brawl and spirits in Ultimate.

== Track listing ==
The music used in Ouendan consists of hit songs by well-known J-pop artists. The majority are taken from the mid-to-late 1990s and early 2000s, though The Blue Hearts' "Linda Linda" and Linda Yamamoto's "Neraiuchi" date from 1987 and 1973, respectively. All of the recordings featured in the game, besides 175R's "Melody" (which also plays over the game's end credits) are covers, rather than recordings by the original artists. The following track list is organized by the original artist, name of the song, and cover artist.

1. Asian Kung-Fu Generation – "Loop & Loop" (Note: Japanese: ループ&ループ, Hepburn: Rūpu & Rūpu) (by Kyōya Asada)
2. Morning Musume – "Koi no Dance Site" (Note: Japanese: 恋のダンスサイト, Hepburn: Koi no Dansu Saito lit. "Love's Dance site") (by Kaoru Kubota, Fumio Kobayashi, Yūko Yajima, Mari Nabatame, and Akina Okabayashi)
3. Ulfuls – "Guts da ze!!" (Note: Japanese: ガッツだぜ!!, Hepburn: Gattsu da ze!! lit. "It's guts!!") (by Hiroaki Takeuchi)
4. 175R – "Melody" (Note: Japanese: メロディー, Hepburn: Merodī)
5. The Blue Hearts – "Linda Linda" (Note: Japanese: リンダ リンダ, Hepburn: Rinda Rinda) (by Daisaku Shimada of Bevenuts)
6. nobodyknows+ – "Kokoro Odoru" (Note: Japanese: ココロオドル; lit. "The heart dances") (by Bugashman, Cantaman, Moss, Mouse-P, and Sausen)
7. B'z – "Atsuki Kodō no Hate" (Note: Japanese: 熱き鼓動の果て; lit. "A hot heartbeat's limit") (by Tetsushi Kimura)
8. Tomoyasu Hotei – "Thrill" (Note: Japanese: スリル, Hepburn: Suriru) (by Hiroaki Takeuchi)
9. Road of Major – "Taisetsu na Mono" (Note: Japanese: 大切なもの; lit. "Something important") (by NoB)
10. Linda Yamamoto – "Neraiuchi" (Note: Japanese: 狙いうち; lit. "Shooting") (by Kaoru Kubota)
11. Kishidan – "One Night Carnival" (by Kei Imai of South 2 Camp)
12. Hitomi Yaida – "Over the Distance" (by Ayako Kawajima)
13. The Yellow Monkey – "Taiyō ga Moeteiru" (Note: Japanese: 太陽が燃えている; lit. "The sun is burning") (by Mitsuru Yanagisako)
14. Orange Range – "Shanghai Honey" (Note: Japanese: 上海ハニー, Hepburn: Shanhai Hanī) (by Bugashman, Cantaman, Moss, Mouse-P, Sausen, mimi, and Akasanajar)
15. L'Arc-en-Ciel – "Ready Steady Go" (by Tetsushi Kimura)
