= Karaoke Revolution (2009 video game) =

- Cropped European box art
- Developer: Blitz Games
- Publisher: Konami
- Series: Karaoke Revolution
- Platforms: PlayStation 3, Wii, Xbox 360
- Release: NA: November 24, 2009; EU: February 12, 2010 (PS3, Wii); AU: May 6, 2010 (PS3)
- Genre: Music / Rhythm
- Modes: Single-player, Multiplayer

Karaoke Revolution is a video game for the PlayStation 3, Wii and Xbox 360. It is developed by Blitz Games and published by Konami. A different version of the game, Karaoke Revolution Glee was released exclusively for the Wii and is based on the popular musical TV sitcom by 20th Century Fox Television.

== Gameplay ==
The player is depicted as a character on-screen performing at a public venue. The words to the song scroll right-to-left at the bottom of the screen, above a piano roll representation of the relative pitches at which they are to be sung (the game calls these "note tubes"). At the left end of this area, a "pitch arrow" shows the pitch which the player is singing and provides feedback on whether s/he's hitting the notes. A "crowd meter" shows the mood of the crowd as the player sings; if s/he does a good job of hitting notes on-pitch then the crowd will cheer more loudly and clap in rhythm with the song, and the scene will become more vividly animated. If the crowd meter falls all the way to the lowest rating, the audience will boo the character off-stage and the game is over. New to this iteration of the series is a deep character customization mode, in which players can change facial features, age, ethnicity and weight, along with various clothes and full outfits that comes pre-equipped with some accessories. Also new is a venue customization mode. This allows players to create their own custom stage to sing in, using pyrotechnics, lights, special effects, screens, and more. The game comes pre-packaged with 10 venues, including a Rockabilly theme, a Tiki Torch theme, a Hollywood Glamour theme, and an Outer Space theme. Players can edit these venues, or create their own, with 6 save spaces for custom venues. Also new is the addition of original music videos, which are available for all 50 songs in the track list. The game comes pre-packaged with a USB Logitech microphone, but it will be compatible with all major gaming mics*, including mics from Rock Band, Guitar Hero, Lips and SingStar.

== Soundtrack ==
The US version of Karaoke Revolution features 50 master tracks (a first for the series), spanning all genres and ranging from classics from the '70s all the way to today's mainstream hits. The UK version features 75 songs. Konami partnered up with Universal Music Enterprises to allow five songs from The Jackson 5 to be featured in the game, along with themes and pictures. Also included are five songs in Spanish on the US version for the first time in the series; the UK version contains songs in French, German, Spanish, Norwegian, and Finnish. The previous downloadable songs from the previous Karaoke Revolution series are also compatible with this version of the series only for the PlayStation 3 and Xbox 360 owners.

1. "7 Things" - Miley Cyrus
2. "99 Times" - Kate Voegele
3. "A Labio Dulce" - Iskander (Spanish song)
4. "ABC" - The Jackson 5
5. "Addicted to Love" - Robert Palmer
6. "Ain't No Stoppin' Us Now" - McFadden & Whitehead
7. "American Boy" - Estelle feat. Kanye West
8. "Beautiful" - Akon feat. Colby O'Donis
9. "Ben" - Michael Jackson
10. "Black Horse and the Cherry Tree" - KT Tunstall
11. "Burning Down the House" - Talking Heads
12. "Crazy" - Seal
13. "Da Ya Think I'm Sexy?" - Rod Stewart
14. "Dancing Machine" - The Jackson 5
15. "Disturbia" - Rihanna
16. "Enamorada" - Miranda! (Spanish song)
17. "Feels Like Tonight" - Daughtry
18. "Gives You Hell" - The All-American Rejects
19. "Human" - The Killers
20. "I Kissed a Girl" - Katy Perry
21. "I Melt with You" - Modern English
22. "I Ran (So Far Away)" - A Flock of Seagulls
23. "I Want You Back" - The Jackson 5
24. "I'll Be There" - The Jackson 5
25. "I'm Yours" - Jason Mraz
26. "Just Dance" - Lady Gaga feat. Colby O'Donis
27. "Love Hurts" - Incubus
28. "Love Is a Battlefield" - Pat Benatar
29. "Love Story" - Taylor Swift
30. "Man On The Moon" - R.E.M.
31. "My Life Would Suck Without You" - Kelly Clarkson
32. "No Me Doy Por Vencido" - Luis Fonsi (Spanish song)
33. "Pocketful of Sunshine" - Natasha Bedingfield
34. "Rehab" - Amy Winehouse
35. "Ser O Parecer" - RBD (Spanish song)
36. "Sex on Fire" - Kings of Leon
37. "Shout" - Tears for Fears
38. "Si Me Besas" - Lola (Spanish song)
39. "Smile" - Lily Allen
40. "So What" - Pink
41. "Solid" - Ashford & Simpson
42. "Soul Meets Body" - Death Cab for Cutie
43. "Space Oddity" - David Bowie
44. "The Logical Song" - Supertramp
45. "This Love" - Maroon 5
46. "Viva la Vida" - Coldplay
47. "What Have I Done to Deserve This?" - Pet Shop Boys & Dusty Springfield
48. "What Hurts the Most" - Rascal Flatts
49. "Wicked Game" - Chris Isaak
50. "You Found Me" - The Fray

The following songs are exclusive to the UK version of Karaoke Revolution:

1. "1000 Miles" - H.E.A.T
2. "Adulte et Sexy" - Emmanuel Moire (French song)
3. "Assis Par Terre" - Louisy Joseph (French song)
4. "Cara Mia" - Måns Zelmerlöw (Swedish song)
5. "Common People" - Pulp
6. "Dragostea din tei" - O-Zone (Romanian song)
7. "Fairytale Gone Bad" - Sunrise Avenue
8. "Freed from Desire" - Gala
9. "Gold" - Klee
10. "Håll om mig" - Nanne (Swedish song)
11. "I'm Gonna Be (500 Miles)" - The Proclaimers
12. "Ihmisten edessä" - Jenni Vartiainen (Finnish song)
13. "In for the Kill" - La Roux
14. "It's My Life" - Amy Diamond
15. "Jan Pillemann Otze" - Mickie Krause (German song)
16. "Kaksi Puuta" - Juha Tapio (Finnish song)
17. "L.E.S. Artistes" - Santigold
18. "La Bamba" - Los Lobos (Spanish song)
19. "La Voix" - Malena Ernman (Swedish song)
20. "Manchmal Mochte Ich Schon Mitt Dir" - Peter Wackel (German song)
21. "New Shoes" - Paolo Nutini
22. "Nur Ein Wort" - Wir sind Helden (German song)
23. "On s'attache" - Christophe Maé (French song)
24. "Ooh La La" - Goldfrapp
25. "Perfekte Welle" - Juli (German song)
26. "So Ein Schoner Tag (Fliegerlied)" - Tim Toupet (German song)
27. "Sometime Around Midnight" - The Airborne Toxic Event
28. "The Sun Always Shines on T.V." - A-ha
29. "Viva Colonia" - Höhner (German song)
30. "Wake Up" - Sliimy

=== Downloadable songs ===
These are the complete finalized list of the downloadable songs and all are still cover versions found from the previous Karaoke Revolution series. The DLC songs "(I've Had) The Time Of My Life" and "You Lost That Lovin' Feelin'" for the Xbox 360 version are not supported with True Duet features. As of 2010, there will no longer be anymore new downloadable songs for both versions of this game.

Song title	Artist	Genre	Release date (PlayStation Store)	Release date (Xbox Live Marketplace)
"(I've Had) The Time Of My Life"	Bill Medley & Jennifer Warnes	Pop	Already available from KR:AI Encore 2	Dec. 23, 2009
"Celebrity"	Brad Paisley	Country	Dec. 22, 2009	No Xbox 360 Release
"Dance, Dance"	Fall Out Boy	Hard Rock	Already available from KR:AI Encore 2	Dec. 23, 2009
"Don't You (Forget About Me)"	Simple Minds	80s	Already available from KR:AI Encore 2	Dec. 29, 2009
"Goodbye Earl"	Dixie Chicks	Country	Dec. 22, 2009	No Xbox 360 Release
"Hot Mama"	Trace Adkins	Country	Dec. 22, 2009	No Xbox 360 Release
"Hungry Like The Wolf"	Duran Duran	80s	Dec. 22, 2009	Dec. 23, 2009
"Mamas Don't Let Your Babies Grow Up To Be Cowboys"	Waylon Jennings & Willie Nelson	Country	Dec. 22, 2009	No Xbox 360 Release
"Me And Bobby McGee"	Janis Joplin	Classics	Dec. 22, 2009	No Xbox 360 Release
"Mud On The Tires"	Brad Paisley	Country	Dec. 22, 2009	No Xbox 360 Release
"Pain"	Jimmy Eat World	Hard Rock	Dec. 22, 2009	No Xbox 360 Release
"Spoonman"	Soundgarden	Hard Rock	Already available from KR:AI Encore 2	Dec. 29, 2009
"The Gambler"	Kenny Rogers	Country	Dec. 22, 2009	No Xbox 360 Release
"What Was I Thinkin'"	Dierks Bentley	Country	Dec. 22, 2009	No Xbox 360 Release
"You Lost That Lovin' Feelin'"	The Righteous Brothers	Classics	Already available from KR:AI Encore 2	Dec. 29, 2009
"Youth Gone Wild"	Skid Row	Hard Rock	Already available from KR:AI Encore 2	Dec. 23, 2009

== Reception ==
Reception

Aggregate score
Aggregator	Score		
Aggregator	PS3	Wii	Xbox 360
Metacritic	66/100	63/100	62/100

Review scores
Publication	Score		
Publication	PS3	Wii	Xbox 360
IGN	7.2/10	6.8/10	7.2/10
Nintendo Power	N/A	6/10	N/A
PlayStation Official Magazine – Australia	7/10	N/A	N/A
PlayStation Official Magazine – UK	4/10	N/A	N/A
Official Xbox Magazine (US)	N/A	N/A	6/10
PlayStation: The Official Magazine	3.5/5	N/A	N/A
TeamXbox	N/A	N/A	6.1/10

The game received "mixed or average reviews" on all platforms according to the review aggregation website Metacritic.

== See also ==
- SingStar
- Rock Band
- Guitar Hero 5
- Karaoke Revolution
- Lips: Number One Hits
