= Elite Beat Agents =

2006 video game

- The European box art for Elite Beat Agents. From left to right are characters Agent Morris, Agent J, and Agent Derek.
- Developer: iNiS
- Publisher: Nintendo
- Director: Keiichi Yano
- Producers: Masako Harada; Shinya Saito
- Designer: Keiichi Yano
- Artist: Risako Watanabe
- Writers: Koji Ito; Kishiko Miyagi
- Platform: Nintendo DS
- Release: NA: November 8, 2006; AU: May 3, 2007; EU: July 13, 2007
- Genre: Rhythm
- Modes: Single-player, multiplayer

Elite Beat Agents is a rhythm video game developed by iNiS and published by Nintendo for the Nintendo DS. It was released in North America, Europe and South Korea. As the second of three rhythm games developed by iNiS specifically for the DS, it is the follow-up and international counterpart to Osu! Tatakae! Ouendan, a Japanese rhythm game released in 2005, sharing many common elements with it.

Similar to Ouendan, the player taps and drags on indicated locations on the touch screen of the DS in time to the rhythm of the music to score points, while the upper screen shows comic-style scenes of the fictional "Elite Beat Agents" cheering on others in tough situations through their dance moves. The improvements made in this game were implemented in the Japanese game's sequel, Moero! Nekketsu Rhythm Damashii Osu! Tatakae! Ouendan 2.

Elite Beat Agents was released under Nintendo's Touch! Generations label in North America, which markets games to audiences outside of the traditional gaming community. Though sales were not as high as expected, the game was well received by critics and merited several 2006 gaming awards.

== Story ==
The main characters of Elite Beat Agents are well-trained spy members of a fictional government agency responsible for helping those in need. When a person facing a crisis reaches their breaking point and cries out for help, Commander Kahn dispatches the agents to help them succeed. The agents never assist the person directly, but encourage the person through their dancing, motivating the people they assist to overcome various obstacles. The person's degree of success depends on the accuracy of the Agents' dance moves, as demonstrated by multiple endings for each story.

Like Ouendan, the tone of the stories told in Agents is primarily humorous. The individual stories are not linked by an overarching narrative; though some characters take part in multiple stories, there are unique protagonists for each song. Although the first few stage scenarios are fairly mundane, such as helping a babysitter control a trio of rowdy children while trying to ask a potential boyfriend to go steady, they progressively become more fantastic, with higher stakes. For example, one of the last stages is about a washed-up professional baseball player who rescues one of his young fans from, and subsequently battles with using baseball equipment and techniques, a fire-breathing golem in a theme park. Another plot aspect taken from Ouendan includes a "sad" level more than halfway through the campaign that is based on a slower, mellow song, titled "A Christmas Gift", in which the agents assist a young girl in reuniting with the spirit of her deceased father. The mission's first phase replaces all percussion and interjections occurring from playing notes correctly with subtle chimes and removes the spoken countdown to go along with the tragic atmosphere and the mission's song, "You're the Inspiration".

The main campaign culminates in a climatic planetary crisis in which the Agents, along with all humanity and the people they helped in prior levels, facing off against an alien invasion staged by the Rhombulans (a portmanteau of rhombus and the Romulan race from the Star Trek franchise), who abhor music and use a petrification ray to enforce a ban on it. Unlike Ouendan, however, this final scenario is divided into two levels, with the first level showing the Agents rallying prisoners to stage a riot against the aliens before sacrificing themselves to the ray, leading up to the second and ultimate final level where the people devastated by their sacrifice gather resolve and determination to reverse their petrification and help organize an epic musical counterattack against the aliens, triumphantly unleashing a blast of spirit energy to the sky to obliterate the Rhombulan mothership.

Several of the levels in Agents are thematically similar to those found in Ouendan; for instance, a level involving time travel to help a popular historical figure in the past (Episode 4), a level taking place inside the human body, and a tearjerker level. In addition, some of the story characters from Ouendan have cameo appearances in Agents. In the final two stages, as in Ouendan, almost all of the characters in the game reappear.

=== Episode & soundtrack list ===
Elite Beat Agents has fifteen scenarios and three unlockable bonus scenarios, with a total of nineteen music tracks. Music heard in the game is performed by cover artists, and in most cases, adjusted for length to be three minutes long.

No.	Scenario name	Original song	Original artist	Cover artist	Main character
1	Trio of Mayhem! Love and Boyfriends!!	"Walkie Talkie Man" (Note: Available in single-card multiplayer.)	Steriogram	Jason Paige	Jane
2	Red Carpet Premiere! Smash Hit or Box Office Crash!!	"Makes No Difference"	Sum 41	Vinn Lombardo	Chris Silverscreen
3	Hey, Taxi! To the hospital, and Hurry!!	"Sk8er Boi"	Avril Lavigne	Angela Michael	Jack
4	Art and Beauty! Love and Happiness!?	"I Was Born to Love You"	Queen	Paul Vician	Leonardo da Vinci
5	Magic Meets Madness! The Show Must Go On!	"Rock This Town"	Stray Cats (Note: Based on the Brian Setzer Orchestra version.)	Mark Latham	Thomas
6	A Pug's Life! 400 Miles from Home!!	"Highway Star"	Deep Purple	Kaleb James	Sam (dog)
7	Ahoy, Mates! Sunken Delights and Adventure!!	"Y.M.C.A."	Village People	TC Moses	Captain Brooke
8	Cry Wolf! Meteorology and Parenting!!	"September"	Earth, Wind & Fire	TC Moses	Sophie
9	Family Honor! Introducing the Secret-Weapon Ninja!!	"Canned Heat"	Jamiroquai	Jason Paige	Ken Ozu
10	Survive! Celebrity Lives and Desert Isles!!	"Material Girl"	Madonna	Melissa Garber	Carrington sisters (Norma, Isabella)
11	NURSE!! Gold Medal Hero or Zero!!	"La La"	Ashlee Simpson	Laura Jane	Bill Mitchell, Ms. White (Bill's white blood cell army commander)
12	A Christmas Gift	"You're the Inspiration"	Chicago	Julian Miranda	Lucy
13	Rags to Riches! Go East, Wildcatter!	"Let's Dance"	David Bowie	Delaney Wolff	Colonel Bob
14	Batter Up! Home Run Hero Makes a Comeback!!	"The Anthem"	Good Charlotte	Kevin Ridel	Hulk Bryman
15	No More Music?? The Last Hope!!	"Without a Fight"	Hoobastank	Kevin Ridel	Humanity
15	No More Music?? The Last Hope!!	"Jumpin' Jack Flash"	The Rolling Stones	Billy Fogarty	Humanity
Bonus 1	Aspire! Dancing to the Limelight!!	"Believe"	Cher	Lynn Rose	Amanda Straw
Bonus 2	Here, Kitty, Kitty! Baby Hijinks!!	"ABC"	The Jackson 5	TC Moses and Brittany Kertesz	Max (cat)
Bonus 3	The Last Laugh! Just a Peanut Matter!!	"Survivor"	Destiny's Child	April Harmony	Jake Irons

== Gameplay ==
A scene from the "Makes No Difference" level on the Cruisin' skill level. The agents must assist a Hollywood director in creating a blockbuster.

The fundamental aspects of gameplay are unchanged from Ouendan to Agents. The stages of Agents are presented in a comic book fashion. After the introduction to a character and their problem, the agents are deployed and the action begins. The play mechanics involve performing one of three actions with the stylus in various combinations.

- Hit Markers: Operated by tapping numbered circles.
- Phrase Markers: Operated by tapping and holding the stylus on a ball within a circle while following it along a path. Some Phrase Markers are reversible, containing a U-turn arrow at either end that reverses the ball's movement.
- Spin Markers: Operated by spinning the stylus around the on-screen disc until bars on both sides light up.

To successfully perform each action one must complete it as a timed circle converges on each main circle. The timing follows the rhythm of the music. The Hit and Phrase markers must be hit in a numbered sequence. The markers are arranged in 'tracks' which range from one to about fifteen markers in length. Success is monitored by the "Elite-O-Meter", a health gauge at the top of the touch screen that is constantly draining at a rate based on the selected difficulty level, out of four total. Successful actions, such as tapping the Hit Markers in sync with the music, will keep the gauge filled, while missing a marker will partially deplete the gauge. If the meter empties completely, the stage ends prematurely in failure. The first three levels of Breezin' difficulty, the easiest one, feature an on-screen indicator to highlight the order in which the markers must be hit. The difficulty level also determines which Agents will be dispatched to missions: the leader of Breezin' difficulty is Agent Spin (BA-5), the leader of Cruisin' (medium) difficulty is Agent J (BA-2), the leader of Sweatin' (hard) difficulty is Agent Chieftain (BA-1) and the Hard ROCK! (expert) difficulty replaces the Agents with the cheerleader-esque Elite Beat Divas. The Hard ROCK! difficulty inverts the beatmaps of Sweatin' difficulty, speeds up timer circles and shrinks Hit Markers, but unlike the two Ouendan games, does not add extra markers or beats. Only the lower two difficulties are available from the start; completing Cruisin' difficulty unlocks Sweatin', which must be completed in turn to unlock Hard ROCK!

Each stage is divided into multiple gameplay sections separated by story sequences, the specific number of which vary by stage. If the Elite-O-Meter is in the yellow when the player reaches one of these breaks, the story will depict the person in need making significant progress towards his or her goal. If it is in the red, the scene will instead depict the person encountering a setback. In between breaks, during the gameplay, the top screen shows the person attempting to accomplish what they need to do at that time. The scene depicted changes every beat, or when the markers switch color, depending on the player's progress. If the player scores an "Elite Beat" by scoring 300 points on each marker in a single beat, then the person makes a lot of progress very enthusiastically. If the player scores a "Beat" (no score lower than 100, but not all 300), the person will be shown making average progress on their goal, but if the player does not score a special beat bonus at all by scoring a 50 on a marker or missing it entirely, the person on the top screen will encounter difficulties and setbacks. The player receives bonuses to the final grade and unlocks artwork for completing a stage with positive outcomes at all stage breaks.

Each stage has three possible endings for its story. The ending depends on the number of gameplay sections passed. If all gameplay sections are passed, the story will have the best ending, with the main character succeeding in its challenge. If at least one section is passed, but not all of them, then the story will have the average ending, where the main character succeeds with moderate success. If all sections are failed, however, the story will have the worst outcome, where the main character finishes his or her endeavor but still fails. Missions are grouped into one of seven acts; in any act before the last that contains multiple missions, players can choose which order to complete all the missions within the same act, but all missions in an act, including any bonus missions unlocked, must be cleared to advance to the next act.

High scores are acquired by achieving combos, or stringing together a series of successful actions. The longer the player is able to maintain a combo, the greater the multiplier applied to each successful action. Should the player miss a marker completely, the multiplier will stop and the player must start a new one. The game keeps track of individual stage high scores for all difficulty levels, as well as a cumulative high score that affects the player's "Agent Rank". The Agent Rank is a special title such as "Soldier of Song" or "King of the Beat" that will change as the player's cumulative high score reaches specific milestones. Elite Beat Agents features three bonus stages that are unlocked when three such ranks are achieved.

The player's performance in each stage is rated by a letter grade, with "D" being the lowest possible rank and S being the highest. To achieve an S rank, the player must hit all markers, score 300 points on at least 90% of them, and score 50 points on no more than 1% of them. Straying from Phrase Marker tracks, however, does not disqualify a player from an S rank as long as at least one dot is played on every phrase marker. Full combos in the game are referred to as "Perfect". Due to the nature of the game's scoring mechanic, it is possible to achieve a new high score in a stage while simultaneously earning a lower grade than the previous high score performance, although this is somewhat rare.

A few additional features have been introduced to Agents from the gameplay in Ouendan. Primarily, these include a preparatory message on startup; a separate 8-point difficulty rating system for missions; Rumble Pak support for force feedback during gameplay; the ability to reveal more statistics about a player's performance when they complete a song; the ability to save their performance as a viewable replay (with only one replay permitted per unique mission) and "ghost" data that they can later use in a "Vs. Ghost" multiplayer mode; the ability to review the last few moments of a failed performance, and the ability to skip the musical introductions to stages.

=== Multiplayer ===
Up to four players can compete against each other using the wireless capabilities of the Nintendo DS using one or more copies of the game with 2-4 Nintendo DS consoles. The same song list is used, but the stage is set using one of five predetermined, competition-based scenarios.

Only songs that the "host" player has completed are available for play. Each player attempts to perform the song in the same manner as the single-player mode. There is no Elite-O-Meter, but instead, the cumulative performance of each player is tracked during the game. At the normal break points for the song, the scene depicts which player is ahead, though it is possible for both players to be tied at this point. During the song, each player can fill a star meter by completing Elite Beats; when the star meter is full, the screens of the opposing players will shake for a few moments, and the on-screen markers will be reduced in size for a short time, making them more difficult to hit. The winner is the player with the best cumulative performance at the end of the song.

When utilizing single-card multiplayer, only five songs are available on "Cruisin'" and "Breezin'" difficulties. When all players have a copy of the game, all of the songs and difficulty levels become available, but each scenario is still assigned to a certain song.

This mode can also be played by a single player against a saved replay for any song.

There is also a cooperative mode, in which players take turns to play. Each user must have a copy of the game to do this. Each song uses the same scenarios as the single-player game, but only the stages the host has completed in single-player are available. Both players share a single Elite-O-Meter, so if one person fails, the game ends for both players. The players take turns playing certain segments of the song, as well as Spin Markers. When it is not the player's turn to play, the markers are grayed out.

== Development ==
Due to the surprisingly high import rate of Osu! Tatakae! Ouendan, Nintendo and iNiS began discussing the possibility of officially localizing the game beyond Japan, but Keiichi Yano, vice president of iNiS and director of the game, explained in an interview with 1UP.com that the selling the game at retail in Western markets would have been unfeasible due to the game's innate reliance on Japanese popular music and cultural references. It was due to this fact that when Yano and iNiS began work on the North American version, the gakuran-wearing cheerleaders of Ouendan were removed and work began on a replacement. The first concepts were of a trio of dancers styled after the Village People called the Disco Rangers; this was changed to a trio of government agents, using distinctly Western references such as the Ghostbusters, Blues Brothers, Men in Black and Austin Powers series for inspiration. They were initially named the Super Sonic Agents, but the name was scrapped due to possible confusion with Super Sonic from the Sonic the Hedgehog video game series, although a vestige of this former name ended up in an E3 trailer for the game. In addition, the concept of the Elite Beat Divas (the Agents equivalent to the Ouendan Cheergirls for expert difficulty) and Commander Kahn directing the Agents came from Charlie's Angels, while the phrase "Agents are go!" was derived from Thunderbirds and the NASA launch sequence. Yano conceived the latter character, who has no Ouendan equivalent, while trying to determine a good motivation for the Agents' service.

When it came to choosing songs for the game's setlist, which was planned to comprise twenty songs as opposed to just fifteen in Ouendan, Yano looked for ones that he thought would be ideal to blast in a "college frat party", while making sure that the setlist drew upon multiple genres and time periods. Ultimately, the song count was pared down to 19 for the final release, with one song, "Livin' La Vida Loca", ultimately being omitted due to licensing issues later into development, after previously being hinted to be included in earlier reports from 1UP. According to E3 trailer footage and UI programmer Robert Ota Dieterich, "Livin' La Vida Loca" was originally going to be used for the game's second level, before being replaced with Sum41's "Makes No Difference". When Nintendo initially unveiled the game's setlist, the songs were listed in random order, leading some to initially mistake the final listed song, "Anthem" to be the last song of the game. The game reused Ouendan's engine, resulting in a few leftover assets from that game appearing in the demo build presented at E3, such as a wall of fire that rises during long combos and calligraphic pass/fail symbols at the end of mid-level cutscenes. Despite Agents not being a strict localization of Ouendan, the product ID Nintendo assigned the game treated it like one, containing the same game-unique combination of three alphanumeric characters used for Ouendan, "AOS".

== Reception ==
Reception

Aggregate scores
Aggregator	Score
GameRankings	88% (52 reviews)
Metacritic	87/100 (51 reviews)

Review scores
Publication	Score
1Up.com	A
Eurogamer	9/10
Game Informer	6.75/10
GamePro	4.25/5
GameRevolution	B
GameSpot	8.9/10
GameSpy	4.5/5
GamesRadar+	4.5/5
GameTrailers	8.8/10
GameZone	9.4/10
IGN	9.5/10
Nintendo Power	9.5/10
Official Nintendo Magazine	87%
X-Play	4/5

Upon release, Elite Beat Agents was critically acclaimed, receiving an average score of 87.7% on GameRankings. By November 2006, Agents sold 120,000 copies. Then-president of Nintendo of America Reggie Fils-Aimé has stated that while sales were strong, he was disappointed that they were not better, having expected 300,000 copies sold in light of critical acclaim. Only 179,000 copies of the game have been sold in North America by January 2009.

Elite Beat Agents won several awards in 2006. It won the Nintendo DS game of the year award from both IGN and from Nintendo Power. IGN gave it several other DS-specific awards, including Best Music Game, Best Artistic Design, Best Story, Most Innovative Design, and Best Licensed Soundtrack. They also awarded its developer, iNiS, with best developer for the DS for its development of Elite Beat Agents. Nintendo Power gave it several other awards as well, including Best Nintendo DS game, Best Music Game, Best Alternative Game, and Best New Character in regard to the Agents. They later named it the best Nintendo DS game released and the seventh best game of the decade. Other notable awards include Best Music/Rhythm Game from GameSpot, an entry on the list of "52 Games We'll Still Be Playing From 2006" from Gaming Target, Best Puzzle Game from GameTrailers, and Quirkiest Game from Electronic Gaming Monthly. During the 10th Annual Interactive Achievement Awards, Elite Beat Agents received a nomination for "Handheld Game of the Year" by the Academy of Interactive Arts & Sciences.

Despite the game never being officially released in Japan, Agents drew the interest of import gamers in the country, just like how Ouendan was enjoyed outside of it.

== Future ==
=== Possible sequel ===
One month after the game's first release in North America, Fils-Aime himself, disappointed with initial sales, expressed hope that Agents could get a sequel and become a franchise, but ultimately nothing came of it. Ten years later, Yano stated in an interview that he would love to bring a sequel to Elite Beat Agents to a Nintendo platform, but the exact circumstances will depend on the capabilities of those platforms and how well the game fits to it.

=== Other appearances ===
- The Elite Beat Agents appear in Super Smash Bros. Brawl as a trophy, and they also are on a few stickers. Characters from Ouendan also appear as stickers and a trophy. The Agents and the Divas, as well as their Ouendan counterparts, later appeared as spirits in Super Smash Bros. Ultimate.
- Character skins for the Agents and Divas were available as limited-time downloadable content for Moero! Nekketsu Rhythm Damashii Osu! Tatakae! Ouendan 2 from DS Download Stations, which has the same improvements from Agents. These skins are no longer officially available to obtain.
- In the summer of 2022, 15 years after the game's release outside of North America, Nintendo purchased an animated film studio and called it Nintendo Pictures, which some have observed to be sharing the name of a fictional company that appeared in the game's second stage as the production company that film director Chris Silverscreen works for.
