= Keiichi Yano (video game designer) =

Japanese video game designer

Keiichi Yano (矢野慶一, Yano Keiichi) is a Tokyo-based video game designer and musician responsible for a number of music video game titles including his most famous game, the 2002 cult video game, Gitaroo Man. Yano has been involved in music (especially jazz music) from a young age and he earned a major in jazz studies at the University of Southern California. He has spent time playing saxophone in Tokyo jazz clubs.

== Career ==
In 1996, Keiichi Yano co-founded the production company, iNiS, and began development of video games. His first project was the early music video game, Gitaroo Man for which he acted as lead programmer. The game enjoyed only moderate sales, however it received critical accolades and became a well-known cult classic.

Since then Yano has developed a number of other music video games including the Ouendan series. The Ouendan games have been criticized as unintelligible to Western markets due to its emphasis on Japanese Ōendan culture, however despite this Yano has created Western-targeted localizations such as the Blues Brothers-influenced Elite Beat Agents. Most recently Yano has created the karaoke game, Lips Yano is personal friends with fellow music video game pioneer, Tetsuya Mizuguchi, and Yano's contributions to the world of music video games have gained him notability as one of the pioneers of the genre.

Aside from music games, Yano has worked on a number of other utilities such as the NFactor2 (a Realtime 3D Engine), the MixJuice Interactive Music Engine, and the Japanese version of the Xbox Voice Chat Interface. He has also worked on such projects as the Japanese localization of the Western Sudeki and even an arcade prototype for a Gundam Pilot Academy from Banpresto.

== Utilities and non-games ==
- NFactor2 Realtime 3D Engine
- MixJuice Interactive Music Engine
- Xbox Voice Chat Interface for the Japanese Xbox

== Games ==
- Gitaroo Man (2002, PS2)
- Sudeki (2004, Xbox) - Japanese localization
- Osu! Tatakae! Ouendan (2005, Nintendo DS)
- Gitaroo Man Lives! (2006, PSP)
- Elite Beat Agents (2006, Nintendo DS)
- Rain: Wonder Trip (2006, PSP)
- Moero! Nekketsu Rhythm Damashii Osu! Tatakae! Ouendan 2 (2007, Nintendo DS)
- Lips (2008, Xbox 360)
