= Karaoke Revolution =

Music video game franchise

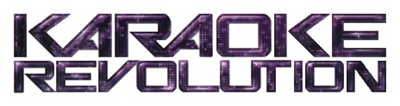
- Logo used in Karaoke Revolution (2009 video game)
- Genre: Rhythm
- Developers: Harmonix (2003–2007); Secret Level, Inc. (2004); Blitz Games (2007–2009); Hijinx Studios (2010–2011)
- Publisher: Konami (2003–2011)
- Platforms: PlayStation 2, Xbox (console), GameCube, Xbox 360, PlayStation 3, Wii
- First release: Karaoke Revolution; November 4, 2003
- Latest release: Karaoke Revolution Glee: Volume 3 November 22, 2011

Karaoke Revolution and its sequels are music video games for the PlayStation 2, PlayStation 3, GameCube, Wii, Xbox, and Xbox 360, developed by Harmonix, Blitz Games, Secret Level, Inc., and Hijinx Studios and published by Konami in its Bemani line of music games. The original concept for the game was created by Scott Hawkins and Sneaky Rabbit Studios. Technology and concepts from the game were subsequently incorporated into Harmonix's game Rock Band.

The Japanese versions of the game are developed by Konami themselves. The gameplay also differs significantly. Rather than a game per se, it is merely a karaoke system for the PlayStation 2, with no judgments.

The game does not attempt to understand the singer's words, but instead detects their pitch. As such, singers can hum to a song or sing different lyrics without penalty. The game adapts to the player singing in a different octave than the song, to accommodate players whose vocal ranges do not fit the song.

The songs in the game are covers of pop hits frequently sung in karaoke bars. This contrasts with the SingStar series from Sony Computer Entertainment Europe, which features only original artist recordings along with the music videos. However, the 2009 remake of the game (titled Karaoke Revolution, just like the original) features all master tracks.

== Gameplay ==
The player is depicted as a character on-screen performing at a public location. The words to the song scroll bottom to top at the bottom of the screen, above a piano roll representation of the relative pitches at which they are to be sung (the game calls these "note tubes"). At the left end of this area, a "pitch star" shows the pitch which the player is singing and provides feedback on whether they're hitting the notes. A "crowd meter" shows the mood of the crowd as the player sings; if they do a good job of hitting notes on-pitch then the crowd will cheer more loudly and clap in rhythm with the song, and the scene will become more vividly animated. If the crowd meter falls all the way to the lowest rating, the audience will boo the character off-stage and the game is over.

Each song is divided into approximately 30 to 50 "phrases". A meter will fill up and turn from red to green for each phrase, based on how well the player sings the right notes; if the player can fill the meter to green, they will score more points, and getting several greens in a row will create a "combo" and award a 2x score multiplier until the player fails to make green on another phrase. This blue meter resembles how long you should hold the note for and at what pitch. The game can be set at higher difficulties which make this meter larger and require the player to hit the right notes more precisely to fill it to green.

Since maximum scores for each song are normalized 50,000 regardless of difficulty, overall scores on songs can be compared. To achieve the gold record for a song, 12,500 points must be achieved. To achieve the platinum record for a song, 20,000 points must be achieved. Winning records will unlock additional characters, outfits, and songs. In Karaoke Revolution Party, Karaoke Revolution Country, Karaoke Revolution Presents: American Idol, and American Idol Encore, 50,000 points (a perfect score) earns a diamond record. In Karaoke Revolution Presents: American Idol Encore 2 the point system was changed so that 60,000 points gives a platinum record for a song and 100,000 points is a perfect score (diamond record).

Karaoke Revolution Volume 2 introduces a "medley mode" which challenges the player to sing a string of short clips from various songs.

Karaoke Revolution Volume 3 introduces "duet mode" which lets two singers play simultaneously. It also revised scoring so that perfect performances result in exactly 50,000 points (with the exception of the Jackson 5's "ABC").

Karaoke Revolution Party features minigames, support for the EyeToy camera, and a "Sing and Dance" mode which utilizes the dance pad controller.

Karaoke Revolution Presents: American Idol utilizes American Idol judges, commentary, and stages.

== Releases ==
Release timeline
2003	Karaoke Revolution
2004	Karaoke Revolution Volume 2
2004	Karaoke Revolution Volume 3
2005	Karaoke Revolution Party
2006	CMT presents: Karaoke Revolution Country
2007	Karaoke Revolution Presents: American Idol
2008	Karaoke Revolution Presents: American Idol Encore
2008	Karaoke Revolution Presents: American Idol Encore 2
2009	Karaoke Revolution (reboot)
2010	Karaoke Revolution Glee
2011	Karaoke Revolution Glee: Volume 2
2011	Karaoke Revolution Glee: Volume 3

Many expansion discs are available for the Japanese version of the game, including an anime song collection and several volumes of J-Pop.

The North American version of Karaoke Revolution was released in November 2003 on PlayStation 2 version in a bundle with the Logitech headset attachment. The game was sold without the headset in February 2004. The PAL version of the game, titled Karaoke Stage, was released in Australia on March 31, 2005, and in Europe on April 22, 2005. Karaoke Stage 2 contains the same songs as Karaoke Revolution Party. The Xbox version was released in November 2004 featuring four more songs that were present in Karaoke Revolution Volume 2 and 10 exclusive Motown songs which are the original non-cover versions. The Xbox version also supported Xbox Live for downloads of more songs.

Karaoke Revolution Volume 2 was released in North America on July 13, 2004, on PlayStation 2; Karaoke Revolution Volume 3 came in November 9 for the same platform.

Karaoke Revolution Party was released in North America on November 8, 2005, on PlayStation 2, Xbox and GameCube. The Xbox version was the only version to feature downloadable songs.

CMT Presents: Karaoke Revolution Country was released in North America on March 28, 2006, on PlayStation 2.

Karaoke Revolution Presents: American Idol was released in North America on January 2, 2007, on PlayStation 2.

- Simon Cowell, Randy Jackson, and Ryan Seacrest lent their voices and allowed their names and likenesses to appear in the game, but Paula Abdul did not and was replaced by a judge named Laura who was voiced by voice actress Kenna Kelly.

Karaoke Revolution Presents: American Idol Encore was released in North America on PlayStation 2, Wii, and Xbox 360 on February 5, 2008, then to Canadian retailers on February 17, with the PlayStation 3 version released in North America on March 4. The PlayStation 3 and Xbox 360 versions were the only ones that featured downloadable songs, but after May 14, no more new downloadable songs came for either version. New downloadable songs will continue with the sequel, Karaoke Revolution Presents: American Idol Encore 2.

- In addition to Simon Cowell and Randy Jackson, Paula Abdul's name, voice, and likeness appear in this title for the first time. Ryan Seacrest did not return to voice himself as the host. He is replaced with voice actor Johnny Jay.
- The PlayStation 3 version is the only one that had all downloadable songs available on the PlayStation Network marketplace. The Xbox 360 version had six songs discontinued from the Xbox Live marketplace for undisclosed reasons. On November 18, 2008, the downloadable song "I'll Make Love to You" became available again in the Xbox Live marketplace.

Karaoke Revolution Presents: American Idol Encore 2 was released on November 18, 2008, in the United States on PlayStation 3, Wii, and Xbox 360. This is the final Karaoke Revolution game to use the American Idol likeness and features and the final Karaoke Revolution game released before the reboot. Songs downloaded from Xbox Live Marketplace for the first Encore game on Xbox 360 are compatible with Encore 2. The previous downloadable songs for the first Encore game on PlayStation 3 downloaded from the PlayStation Store would be automatically imported to Encore 2. For the first time, Konami has released 5 new downloadable songs that never appeared in any of the previous Karaoke Revolution series before. However, these songs originally appeared from one of Konami's other musical game Rock Revolution.

In 2009, Konami released a new version for the Xbox 360, Wii, and PlayStation 3 as a reboot of the franchise. It features enhanced career and multiplayer modes, the ability to record footage for venues with the Xbox Live Vision and PlayStation Eye cameras, and a soundtrack with 50 tracks, all original versions rather than the covers used in previous versions.

Karaoke Revolution Glee was released in North America on April 13, 2010, on Wii. Featuring clips and music from the show

Karaoke Revolution Glee: Volume 2 was released in North America on April 5, 2011, on Wii.

Karaoke Revolution Glee: Volume 3 was released in North America on November 22, 2011 for the Wii and Xbox 360. This is also the final Karaoke Revolution game developed and released for the entire series, there will be no longer anymore Karaoke Revolution games developed for the series as it ended.

Four different microphones were released for the game:

- The original microphone included with the first Karaoke Revolution game is a headset model, and is compatible with the PlayStation 2, PlayStation 3, Wii, and Xbox 360.
- An updated microphone model was included with future Karaoke Revolution games, and is also used for Karaoke Stage, the European edition, and is compatible with the PlayStation 2, PlayStation 3, Wii, and Xbox 360. It is a standardized microphone that is also compatible with other games (such as Rock Band, Boogie, and High School Musical: Sing It!).
- An Xbox-compatible microphone was included with versions of Karaoke Revolution for Xbox. It plugs into a memory card/headset port on the controller.
- A GameCube-compatible microphone was included with Karaoke Revolution Party for GameCube. It plugs into the memory card slot. It is a standardized microphone that is also compatible with other games (such as Mario Party 6).

== Reception ==
Aggregate Reviews
Game	Game Rankings	MetaCritic
Karaoke Revolution (PS2)	84%	83/100
Karaoke Revolution (Xbox)	84%	80/100
Karaoke Revolution Volume 2 (PS2)	81%	76/100
Karaoke Revolution Volume 3 (PS2)	85%	82/100
Karaoke Revolution Party (PS2)	80%	78/100
Karaoke Revolution Party (Xbox)	81%	80/100
Karaoke Revolution Party (GameCube)	81%	80/100
Karaoke Revolution: American Idol (PS2)	78%	78/100
CMT Presents: Karaoke Revolution Country (PS2)	73%	71/100
Karaoke Revolution Presents: American Idol Encore (X360)	68%	70/100
Karaoke Revolution Presents: American Idol Encore (PS2)	76%	76/100
Karaoke Revolution Presents: American Idol Encore (PS3)	62%	
Karaoke Revolution Presents: American Idol Encore (Wii)	68%	
Karaoke Revolution Presents: American Idol Encore 2 (X360)	55%	
Karaoke Revolution Presents: American Idol Encore 2 (PS3)	55%	
Karaoke Revolution Presents: American Idol Encore 2 (Wii)	53%	

IGN ranked the 2003 version as the 99th best PlayStation 2 game due to the involvement of Harmonix.

Volume 3 was nominated for the "Best Puzzle/Rhythm Game" award at GameSpot's Best and Worst of 2004 Awards, which went to Katamari Damacy.

== See also ==
- List of Karaoke Revolution songs
- Battle Rap Stars
- SingStar
- Def Jam Rapstar
