= List of Xbox Game Studios video games =

Xbox Game Studios (formerly Microsoft Games, Microsoft Game Studios and Microsoft Studios) is an American video game publisher that is a division of Xbox. The division was created in March 2000 and replaced Microsoft's internal Games Group. This is a list of games that were published directly by Microsoft through the Games Group and, later, through Xbox Game Studios.

== Video games ==
Title	Platform(s)	Release date	Developer(s)	Ref.
Magic School Bus Discovers Flight	Microsoft Windows	April 24, 2001	KnowWonder	
Magic School Bus Whales and Dolphins	Microsoft Windows	April 24, 2001	KnowWonder	
Microsoft Train Simulator	Microsoft Windows	June 2001	Kuju Entertainment	
MechCommander 2	Microsoft Windows	July 17, 2001	FASA Studio	
Magic School Bus Volcano Adventure	Mac OS	July 31, 2001	KnowWonder	
Magic School Bus Volcano Adventure	Microsoft Windows	July 31, 2001	KnowWonder	
Links: Championship Edition	Microsoft Windows	September 19, 2001	Indie Built	
Zoo Tycoon	Microsoft Windows	October 17, 2001	Blue Fang Games	
Links 2001	Microsoft Windows	October 2001	Access Software	
Bicycle Board Games	Microsoft Windows	November 14, 2001	Random Games	
Bicycle Card Games	Microsoft Windows	November 14, 2001	Compulsive Development	
Bicycle Casino Games	Microsoft Windows	November 14, 2001	Compulsive Development, Glass Eye Entertainment	
Dead or Alive 3	Xbox	November 15, 2001	Team Ninja	
Fuzion Frenzy	Xbox	November 15, 2001	Blitz Games	
Halo: Combat Evolved	Xbox	November 15, 2001	Bungie	
Oddworld: Munch's Oddysee	Xbox	November 15, 2001	Oddworld Inhabitants	
NFL Fever 2002	Xbox	November 15, 2001	Microsoft	
Project Gotham Racing	Xbox	November 15, 2001	Bizarre Creations	
Amped: Freestyle Snowboarding	Xbox	November 20, 2001	Indie Built	
Azurik: Rise of Perathia	Xbox	November 28, 2001	Adrenium Games	
Microsoft Flight Simulator 2002	Microsoft Windows	November 2001	Microsoft	
Nightcaster: Defeat the Darkness	Xbox	December 26, 2001	VR1 Entertainment	
Blood Wake	Xbox	December 30, 2001	Stormfront Studios	
Magic School Bus Whales and Dolphins	Mac OS	2001	KnowWonder	
Microsoft Bicycle Series	Microsoft Windows	2001	Random Games, Compulsive Development	
NBA Inside Drive 2002	Xbox	January 2002	High Voltage Software	
Sneakers	Xbox	February 22, 2002	Media.Vision	
RalliSport Challenge	Xbox	March 14, 2002	Digital Illusions CE	
Dungeon Siege	Microsoft Windows	April 5, 2002	Gas Powered Games	
Magic School Bus Explores the World of Animals	Microsoft Windows	June 15, 2002	KnowWonder	
NFL Fever 2003	Xbox	August 2002	Microsoft Game Studios	
Blinx: The Time Sweeper	Xbox	September 8, 2002	Artoon	
Quantum Redshift	Xbox	September 16, 2002	Curly Monsters	
Links 2003	Microsoft Windows	October 1, 2002	Indie Built	
Whacked!	Xbox	October 8, 2002	Presto Studios	
NBA Inside Drive 2003	Xbox	October 15, 2002	High Voltage Software	
Microsoft Combat Flight Simulator 3: Battle for Europe	Microsoft Windows	October 24, 2002	Microsoft Game Studios	
Age of Mythology	Microsoft Windows	October 30, 2002	Ensemble Studios	
RalliSport Challenge	Microsoft Windows	November 7, 2002	Digital Illusions CE	
MechWarrior 4: Mercenaries	Microsoft Windows	November 8, 2002	Cyberlore, FASA Studio	
Kakuto Chojin: Back Alley Brutal	Xbox	November 11, 2002	Dream Publishing, RIZ	
MechAssault	Xbox	November 15, 2002	Day 1 Studios	
Asheron's Call 2: Fallen Kings	Microsoft Windows	November 22, 2002	Turbine Entertainment	
Impossible Creatures	Microsoft Windows	January 7, 2003	Relic Entertainment	
Kung Fu Chaos	Xbox	February 25, 2003	Just Add Monsters	
Freelancer	Microsoft Windows	March 4, 2003	Digital Anvil	
Tao Feng: Fist of the Lotus	Xbox	March 18, 2003	Studio Gigante	
N.U.D.E.@: Natural Ultimate Digital Experiment	Xbox	April 24, 2003	Red Entertainment, Rocket Studio	
Inside Pitch 2003	Xbox	May 20, 2003	Indie Built	
Rise of Nations	Microsoft Windows	May 20, 2003	Big Huge Games	
Brute Force	Xbox	May 27, 2003	Digital Anvil	
Midtown Madness 3	Xbox	June 17, 2003	Digital Illusions CE	
Microsoft Flight Simulator 2004: A Century of Flight	Microsoft Windows	July 29, 2003	Microsoft Game Studios	
Hexic	Microsoft Windows	July 2003	Carbonated Games	
NFL Fever 2004	Xbox	August 26, 2003	Microsoft Game Studios	
NBA Inside Drive 2004	Xbox	September 3, 2003	High Voltage Software	
Voodoo Vince	Xbox	September 22, 2003	Beep Industries	
Halo: Combat Evolved	Microsoft Windows	September 30, 2003	Gearbox Software	
Amped 2	Xbox	October 20, 2003	Access Software	
Crimson Skies: High Road to Revenge	Xbox	October 21, 2003	FASA Studio	
Grabbed by the Ghoulies	Xbox	October 21, 2003	Rare	
Xbox Music Mixer	Xbox	October 27, 2003	WildTangent Games	
Top Spin	Xbox	October 28, 2003	PAM Development	
Maximum Chase	Xbox	November 6, 2003	Genki	
Links 2004	Xbox	November 11, 2003	Indie Built	
Project Gotham Racing 2	Xbox	November 17, 2003	Bizarre Creations	
Counter-Strike	Xbox	November 18, 2003	Ritual Entertainment	
Magatama	Xbox	November 20, 2003	Microsoft Game Studios Japan	
NHL Rivals 2004	Xbox	November 20, 2003	Microsoft Game Studios	
RalliSport Challenge 2	Xbox	May 21, 2004	Digital Illusions CE	
OutRun 2	Xbox	June 25, 2004	Sumo Digital	
Sudeki	Xbox	July 20, 2004	Climax Studios	
Fable	Xbox	September 14, 2004	Lionhead Studios, Big Blue Box Studios	
Kingdom Under Fire: The Crusaders	Xbox	October 12, 2004	Phantagram	
Halo 2	Xbox	November 9, 2004	Bungie	
Zoo Tycoon 2	Microsoft Windows	November 11, 2004	Blue Fang Games	
Blinx 2: Masters of Time and Space	Xbox	November 18, 2004	Artoon	
MechAssault 2: Lone Wolf	Xbox	December 28, 2004	Day 1 Studios	
Phantom Dust	Xbox	March 15, 2005	Microsoft Game Studios Japan	
Jade Empire	Xbox	April 12, 2005	BioWare	
Forza Motorsport	Xbox	May 3, 2005	Turn 10 Studios	
ThinkTanks	Xbox	May 9, 2005	Bravetree Productions	
Conker: Live & Reloaded	Xbox	June 21, 2005	Rare	
Double S.T.E.A.L: The Second Clash	Xbox	August 4, 2005	Bunkasha Games	
Dungeon Siege II	Microsoft Windows	August 16, 2005	Gas Powered Games	
Fable: The Lost Chapters	Microsoft Windows	September 20, 2005	Lionhead Studios	
Kingdom Under Fire: Heroes	Xbox	September 20, 2005	Blueside, Phantagram	
Mutant Storm Reloaded	Xbox Live Arcade	October 3, 2005	PomPom Software	
Age of Empires III	Microsoft Windows	October 18, 2005	Ensemble Studios	
Fable: The Lost Chapters	Xbox	October 18, 2005	Lionhead Studios	
Project Gotham Racing 3	Xbox 360	November 22, 2005	Bizarre Creations	
Hexic	Xbox Live Arcade	November 22, 2005	Carbonated Games	
Kameo	Xbox 360	November 22, 2005	Rare	
Perfect Dark Zero	Xbox 360	November 22, 2005	Rare	
Every Party	Xbox 360	December 10, 2005	Microsoft Game Studios Japan, Game Republic	
Uno	Xbox Live Arcade	May 8, 2006	Carbonated Games	
Rise of Nations: Rise of Legends	Microsoft Windows	May 9, 2006	Big Huge Games, Volt Information Services	
N3: Ninety-Nine Nights	Xbox 360	August 15, 2006	Q Entertainment, Phantagram	
TotemBall	Xbox Live Arcade	October 4, 2006	Strange Flavour, Freeverse	
Microsoft Flight Simulator X	Microsoft Windows	October 17, 2006	Aces Game Studio	
Gears of War	Xbox 360	November 7, 2006	Epic Games, Psyonix	
Viva Piñata	Xbox 360	November 9, 2006	Rare	
Big Bumpin'	Xbox, Xbox 360	November 19, 2006	Blitz Games	
PocketBike Racer	Xbox, Xbox 360	November 19, 2006	Blitz Games	
Sneak King	Xbox, Xbox 360	November 19, 2006	Blitz Games	
Small Arms	Xbox Live Arcade	November 22, 2006	Gastronaut Studios	
Fuzion Frenzy 2	Xbox 360	January 30, 2007	Hudson Soft	
Crackdown	Xbox 360	February 20, 2007	Realtime Worlds, Denki, Xen Services	
Jetpac Refuelled	Xbox Live Arcade	March 28, 2007	Rare	
Eets: Chowdown	Xbox Live Arcade	April 25, 2007	Klei Entertainment	
Aegis Wing	Xbox Live Arcade	May 16, 2007	Carbonated Games	
Forza Motorsport 2	Xbox 360	May 29, 2007	Turn 10 Studios	
Shadowrun	Microsoft Windows	May 29, 2007	FASA Studio	
Shadowrun	Xbox 360	May 29, 2007	FASA Studio	
Halo 2	Microsoft Windows	May 31, 2007	Hired Gun	
Tenchu Z	Xbox 360	June 12, 2007	K2 LLC	
Band of Bugs	Xbox Live Arcade	June 20, 2007	NinjaBee	
Vampire Rain	Xbox 360	July 3, 2007	Artoon	
Project Sylpheed: Arc of Deception	Xbox 360	July 10, 2007	Game Arts, SETA	
Marathon 2: Durandal	Xbox Live Arcade	August 1, 2007	Freeverse	
Spyglass Board Games	Xbox Live Arcade	August 1, 2007	Strange Flavour, Freeverse	
Hexic 2	Xbox Live Arcade	August 15, 2007	Carbonated Games	
Blue Dragon	Xbox 360	August 28, 2007	Mistwalker, Artoon	
Halo 3	Xbox 360	September 25, 2007	Bungie	
Project Gotham Racing 4	Xbox 360	October 2, 2007	Bizarre Creations	
Tetris Splash	Xbox Live Arcade	October 3, 2007	Tetris Online	
Yaris	Xbox Live Arcade	October 10, 2007	Castaway Entertainment	
Viva Piñata: Party Animals	Xbox 360	October 30, 2007	Krome Studios	
Scene It? Lights, Camera, Action	Xbox 360	November 6, 2007	WXP Games	
Viva Piñata	Microsoft Windows	November 6, 2007	Climax Studios	
Gears of War	Microsoft Windows	November 7, 2007	Epic Games, People Can Fly	
Mass Effect	Xbox 360	November 20, 2007	BioWare	
Kingdom Under Fire: Circle of Doom	Xbox 360	December 13, 2007	Blueside	
Rez HD	Xbox Live Arcade	January 30, 2008	Q Entertainment, HexaDrive	
Poker Smash	Xbox Live Arcade	February 6, 2008	Void Star Creations	
Lost Odyssey	Xbox 360	February 12, 2008	Mistwalker, Feelplus	
Rocky and Bullwinkle	Xbox Live Arcade	April 16, 2008	Zen Studios	
Buku Sudoku	Xbox Live Arcade	May 28, 2008	Absolutist	
Mass Effect	Microsoft Windows	May 28, 2008	Demiurge Studios	
Go! Go! Break Steady	Xbox Live Arcade	July 23, 2008	Little Boy Games	
Braid	Xbox Live Arcade	August 6, 2008	Number None	
Fable II: Pub Games	Xbox Live Arcade	August 13, 2008	Carbonated Games, Lionhead Studios	
Too Human	Xbox 360	August 19, 2008	Silicon Knights	
Viva Piñata: Trouble in Paradise	Xbox 360	September 2, 2008	Rare	
Domino Master	Xbox Live Arcade	September 17, 2008	TikGames	
Tinker	Microsoft Windows	September 23, 2008	Fuel Games	
Crazy Mouse	Xbox Live Arcade	October 15, 2008	UltiZen Games	
Fable II	Xbox 360	October 21, 2008	Lionhead Studios	
Scene It? Box Office Smash!	Xbox 360	October 28, 2008	Krome Studios, Screenlife	
Gears of War 2	Xbox 360	November 7, 2008	Epic Games, People Can Fly	
Banjo-Kazooie: Nuts & Bolts	Xbox 360	November 11, 2008	Rare	
Lips	Xbox Live Arcade	November 18, 2008	Inis Corporation	
A Kingdom for Keflings	Xbox Live Arcade	November 19, 2008	NinjaBee	
Banjo-Kazooie	Xbox Live Arcade	December 3, 2008	4J Studios	
Doritos: Dash of Destruction	Xbox Live Arcade	December 17, 2008	NinjaBee	
Interpol: The Trail of Dr. Chaos	Xbox Live Arcade	January 7, 2009	TikGames	
The Maw	Xbox Live Arcade	January 21, 2009	Twisted Pixel Games	
FunTown Mahjong	Xbox Live Arcade	January 28, 2009	FunTown World	
Minesweeper Flags	Xbox Live Arcade	February 11, 2009	TikGames	
Death Tank	Xbox Live Arcade	February 18, 2009	Snowblind Studios	
Halo Wars	Xbox 360	March 3, 2009	Ensemble Studios	
Gerbil Physics	Xbox Live Arcade	March 14, 2009	Pencel Games	
Uno Rush	Xbox Live Arcade	March 25, 2009	Carbonated Games	
TiQal	Microsoft Windows	March 26, 2009	Slapdash Games	
TiQal	Xbox Live Arcade	March 26, 2009	Slapdash Games	
The Dishwasher: Dead Samurai	Xbox Live Arcade	April 1, 2009	Ska Studios	
Ninja Blade	Xbox 360	April 7, 2009	FromSoftware	
Banjo-Tooie	Xbox Live Arcade	April 29, 2009	4J Studios	
Wits and Wagers	Xbox Live Arcade	May 7, 2009	Hidden Path Entertainment	
Blazing Birds	Xbox Live Arcade	May 20, 2009	Vector 2 Games	
Trials HD	Xbox Live Arcade	August 12, 2009	RedLynx	
Shadow Complex	Xbox Live Arcade	August 19, 2009	Chair Entertainment	
Hexic	Zune	September 1, 2009	Carbonated Games	
Halo 3: ODST	Xbox 360	September 22, 2009	Bungie	
South Park: Let's Go Tower Defense Play!	Xbox Live Arcade	October 7, 2009	Doublesix	
Lips: Number One Hits	Xbox 360	October 20, 2009	Inis Corporation	
Tower Bloxx Deluxe 3D	Xbox Live Arcade	October 21, 2009	Digital Chocolate	
Forza Motorsport 3	Xbox 360	October 27, 2009	Turn 10 Studios	
Lips: Deutsche Partyknaller	Xbox 360	October 30, 2009	Inis Corporation	
Lips: Canta en Español	Xbox 360	November 13, 2009	Inis Corporation	
1 vs. 100	Xbox 360	November 19, 2009	Microsoft Game Studios	
Mahjong Tales: Ancient Wisdom	Microsoft Windows	February 22, 2010	Creat Studios	
Lips: Party Classics	Xbox 360	March 2, 2010	Inis Corporation	
Toy Soldiers	Xbox Live Arcade	March 3, 2010	Signal Studios	
Scrap Metal	Xbox Live Arcade	March 10, 2010	Slick Entertainment	
Perfect Dark	Xbox Live Arcade	March 17, 2010	4J Studios	
Game Room	Microsoft Windows	March 24, 2010	Krome Studios	
Game Room	Xbox 360	March 24, 2010	Krome Studios	
Lips: I Love the 80s	Xbox 360	April 2, 2010	Inis Corporation	
Tom Clancy's Splinter Cell: Conviction	Xbox 360	April 13, 2010	Ubisoft Montreal	
Tom Clancy's Splinter Cell: Conviction	Microsoft Windows	April 27, 2010	Ubisoft Montreal	
Alan Wake	Xbox 360	May 18, 2010	Remedy Entertainment	
Aqua	Xbox Live Arcade	May 19, 2010	Games Distillery	
Snoopy Flying Ace	Xbox Live Arcade	June 12, 2010	WildWorks	
Space Ark	Xbox Live Arcade	June 16, 2010	Strawdog Studios	
Ancients of Ooga	Xbox Live Arcade	June 30, 2010	NinjaBee	
Crackdown 2	Xbox 360	July 6, 2010	Ruffian Games	
Limbo	Xbox 360	July 21, 2010	Playdead	
Monday Night Combat	Xbox Live Arcade	August 11, 2010	Uber Entertainment	
Halo: Reach	Xbox 360	September 14, 2010	Bungie	
Hydrophobia	Xbox Live Arcade	September 29, 2010	Dark Energy Digital	
Flowerz	Windows Phone	September 30, 2010	Microsoft Studios	
Hexic Rush	Windows Phone	September 30, 2010	Microsoft Studios	
Comic Jumper	Xbox Live Arcade	October 6, 2010	Twisted Pixel Games	
The Harvest	Windows Phone	October 16, 2010	Microsoft Studios	
The Revenants: Corridor of Souls	Windows Phone	October 18, 2010	Chaotic Moon Studios	
Rocket Riot	Windows Phone	October 21, 2010	Codeglue	
Game Chest: Solitaire Edition	Windows Phone	October 25, 2010	Microsoft Studios	
Fable III	Xbox 360	October 26, 2010	Lionhead Studios	
Pinball FX2	Xbox Live Arcade	October 27, 2010	Zen Studios	
Kinectimals	Kinect	November 4, 2010	Frontier Developments	
Kinect Adventures!	Kinect	November 4, 2010	Good Science Studio, Iron Galaxy Studios, Liquid Development, Phosphor Games, Smoking Gun Interactive	
Kinect Joy Ride	Kinect	November 4, 2010	BigPark	
Kinect Sports	Kinect	November 4, 2010	Rare	
Ilomilo	Windows Phone	November 8, 2010	SouthEnd Interactive	
Doritos Crash Course	Xbox Live Arcade	December 8, 2010	Behaviour Interactive Chile	
Doritos Crash Course Go!	Windows Phone	December 8, 2010	Behaviour Interactive Chile	
Harms Way	Xbox Live Arcade	December 8, 2010	Bongfish	
Rise of Glory	Windows Phone	December 14, 2010	Revo Solutions Games	
Game Chest: Logic Games	Windows Phone	December 15, 2010	Microsoft Studios	
Revolution	Windows Phone	December 18, 2010	Microsoft Studios	
A World of Keflings	Xbox Live Arcade	December 22, 2010	NinjaBee	
Raskulls	Xbox Live Arcade	December 29, 2010	Halfbrick Studios	
Ilomilo	Xbox Live Arcade	January 5, 2011	SouthEnd Interactive	
Zombies	Windows Phone	January 12, 2011	Babaroga	
I Dig It	Windows Phone	January 15, 2011	InMotion Software	
iBlast Moki	Windows Phone	January 2011	Godzilab	
Burn It All!	Windows Phone	February 10, 2011	PastaGames	
Torchlight	Xbox Live Arcade	March 9, 2011	Runic Games	
Full House Poker	Xbox Live Arcade	March 16, 2011	Krome Studios	
Harbor Master	Windows Phone	March 19, 2011	Imangi Studios	
Fable: Coin Golf	Windows Phone	March 30, 2011	Ideaworks Game Studio, Lionhead Studios	
Islands of Wakfu	Xbox Live Arcade	March 30, 2011	Ankama	
Wordament	Windows Phone	April 1, 2011	You vs. the Internet	
The Dishwasher: Vampire Smile	Xbox Live Arcade	April 6, 2011	Ska Studios	
GeoDefense	Windows Phone	May 1, 2011	Critical Thought Games	
Fable III	Microsoft Windows	May 17, 2011	Lionhead Studios	
Angry Birds	Windows Phone	May 27, 2011	Innogiant	
Kinect Fun Labs: Bobble Head	Kinect	June 6, 2011	Good Science Studio	
Kinect Fun Labs: Build a Buddy	Kinect	June 6, 2011	Good Science Studio	
Kinect Fun Labs: Kinect Googly Eyes	Kinect	June 6, 2011	Good Science Studio, Smoking Gun Interactive	
Kinect Fun Labs: Kinect Me	Kinect	June 6, 2011	Good Science Studio, Smoking Gun Interactive	
Iron Brigade	Xbox Live Arcade	June 22, 2011	Double Fine Productions	
Half-Minute Hero: Super Mega Neo Climax	Xbox Live Arcade	June 29, 2011	Opus Studio, Marvelous Entertainment	
Beards & Beaks	Xbox Live Arcade	July 13, 2011	Microsoft Game Studios	
Ms. Splosion Man	Xbox Live Arcade	July 13, 2011	Twisted Pixel Games	
Kinect Fun Labs: Avatar Kinect	Kinect	July 25, 2011	Good Science Studio	
Kinect Fun Labs: Kinect Sparkler	Kinect	July 28, 2011	Good Science Studio, Smoking Gun Interactive	
Sudoku	Windows Phone	July 29, 2011	Babaroga	
Insanely Twisted Shadow Planet	Xbox Live Arcade	August 3, 2011	Fuelcell	
Fruit Ninja Kinect	Kinect	August 10, 2011	Halfbrick Studios	
Fight Game: Rivals	Windows Phone	August 11, 2011	Microsoft Studios	
Age of Empires Online	Microsoft Windows	August 16, 2011	Gas Powered Games, Robot Entertainment	
Toy Soldiers: Cold War	Xbox Live Arcade	August 17, 2011	Signal Studios	
Kinect Fun Labs: Air Band	Kinect	August 22, 2011	Relentless Software, Good Science Studio	
Hole in the Wall	Xbox 360	August 24, 2011	Ludia	
Implode!	Windows Phone	September 1, 2011	IUGO Games	
Crimson Alliance	Xbox Live Arcade	September 7, 2011	Certain Affinity	
The Gunstringer	Kinect	September 13, 2011	Twisted Pixel Games	
Radiant Silvergun	Xbox Live Arcade	September 14, 2011	Treasure	
Gears of War 3	Xbox 360	September 20, 2011	Epic Games, People Can Fly, Phosphor Games	
Cro-Mag Rally	Windows Phone	September 23, 2011	Citizen12	
Kinect Fun Labs: Mutation Station	Kinect	September 26, 2011	Relentless Software, Good Science Studio	
Worms: Ultimate Mayhem	Xbox Live Arcade	September 28, 2011	Team17	
Orcs Must Die!	Xbox Live Arcade	October 5, 2011	Robot Entertainment, Pixelocity Software	
Forza Motorsport 4	Xbox 360	October 11, 2011	Turn 10 Studios	
Fusion: Sentient	Windows Phone	October 12, 2011	Wahoo Studios	
Kinect Fun Labs: Musical Feet	Kinect	October 24, 2011	Smoking Gun Interactive	
Kinect Sports: Season Two	Kinect	October 25, 2011	Rare, BigPark	
Farm Frenzy 2	Xbox 360	November 1, 2011	Alawar Entertainment	
Shuffle Party	Windows Phone	November 3, 2011	Babaroga	
Fusion: Genesis	Xbox Live Arcade	November 9, 2011	Starfire Studios	
Breeze	Windows Phone	November 11, 2011	Null City Software	
Halo: Combat Evolved Anniversary	Xbox 360	November 15, 2011	343 Industries, Saber Interactive	
Kinect: Disneyland Adventures	Kinect	November 15, 2011	Frontier Developments	
MiniSquadron	Windows Phone	November 19, 2011	Supermono Studios	
Kinect Fun Labs: Battle Stuff	Kinect	November 28, 2011	Smoking Gun Interactive	
Zombies (On the Phone)	Windows Phone	November 29, 2011	Ska Studios	
Haunt	Kinect	January 18, 2012	NanaOn-Sha	
Burn the Rope	Windows Phone	January 27, 2012	Big Blue Bubble	
Double Fine Happy Action Theater	Xbox Live Arcade	February 1, 2012	Double Fine Productions	
BulletAsylum	Windows Phone	February 8, 2012	UberGeekGames	
Chickens Can't Fly	Windows Phone	February 15, 2012	Amused Sloth	
Kinect Fun Labs: Junk Fu	Kinect	February 20, 2012	Wahoo Studios	
Alan Wake's American Nightmare	Xbox Live Arcade	February 22, 2012	Remedy Entertainment	
Toy Soldiers: Boot Camp	Windows Phone	February 29, 2012	Signal Studios	
Gerbil Physics	Android	March 14, 2012	Pencel Games	
Kinect Rush: A Disney Pixar Adventure	Kinect	March 20, 2012	Asobo Studio	
Sine Mora	Xbox Live Arcade	March 21, 2012	Digital Reality, Grasshopper Interactive	
Kinect Fun Labs: I Am Super!	Kinect	March 26, 2012	Smoking Gun Interactive	
South Park: Tenorman's Revenge	Xbox 360	March 30, 2012	Other Ocean Interactive, South Park Digital Studios	
Microsoft Flight	Microsoft Windows	April 3, 2012	Microsoft Game Studios Vancouver	
Diabolical Pitch	Kinect	April 4, 2012	Grasshopper Manufacture	
Anomaly: Warzone Earth	Xbox Live Arcade	April 6, 2012	11 Bit Studios	
Kinect Rush: Snapshot	Kinect	April 6, 2012	Asobo Studio	
The Splatters	Xbox Live Arcade	April 11, 2012	SpikySnail	
Fez	Xbox Live Arcade	April 13, 2012	Polytron	
Insanely Twisted Shadow Planet	Microsoft Windows	April 17, 2012	Fuelcell	
Trials Evolution	Xbox Live Arcade	April 18, 2012	RedLynx	
Bloodforge	Xbox Live Arcade	April 25, 2012	Climax Studios	
Toy Soldiers	Microsoft Windows	April 27, 2012	Signal Studios	
Fable Heroes	Xbox Live Arcade	May 2, 2012	Lionhead Studios	
GeoDefense Swarm	Windows Phone	May 7, 2012	Critical Thought Games	
Minecraft: Xbox 360 Edition	Xbox 360	May 9, 2012	4J Studios	
Dragon's Lair	Kinect	May 18, 2012	Advanced Microcomputer Systems	
Joy Ride Turbo	Xbox Live Arcade	May 23, 2012	BigPark	
Kinect Fun Labs: 5 Micro Lab Challenge	Kinect	July 2, 2012	N-Space	
Spelunky	Xbox Live Arcade	July 4, 2012	Mossmouth	
Mush	Windows Phone	July 4, 2012	Angry Mango Games	
Lode Runner	Windows Phone	July 10, 2012	Studio Voltz	
Dungeon Fighter LIVE: Fall of Hendon Myre	Xbox 360	July 12, 2012	NEXON	
Kinect Fun Labs: Mars Rover Landing	Kinect	July 16, 2012	Smoking Gun Interactive	
Wreckateer	Kinect	July 25, 2012	Iron Galaxy Studios	
Adera	Microsoft Windows	August 1, 2012	HitPoint Studios	
Deadlight	Xbox Live Arcade	August 1, 2012	Tequila Works	
Iron Brigade	Microsoft Windows	August 13, 2012	Other Ocean Interactive	
Dust: An Elysian Tail	Xbox Live Arcade	August 15, 2012	Humble Hearts	
Shoot 1UP	Windows Phone	August 20, 2012	Mommy's Best Games	
Mark of the Ninja	Xbox Live Arcade	September 7, 2012	Klei Entertainment	
Crimson Dragon: Side Story	Windows Phone	September 12, 2012	Grounding	
Joe Danger 2: The Movie	Xbox Live Arcade	September 14, 2012	Hello Games	
Kinect Nat Geo TV	Kinect	September 18, 2012	Relentless Software, SkyBox Labs	
Kinect Sesame Street TV	Kinect	September 18, 2012	Soho Productions	
Kinect Sports: Ultimate Collection	Kinect	September 18, 2012	Rare	
Fire Pro Wrestling	Xbox 360	September 21, 2012	Spike Chunsoft	
Tentacles: Enter The Dolphin	iOS	October 4, 2012	Press Play	
Contre Jour	Browser	October 9, 2012	Clarity Consulting	
Fable: The Journey	Kinect	October 9, 2012	Lionhead Studios	
Happy Wars	Xbox Live Arcade	October 12, 2012	Toylogic	
Cracking Sands	Microsoft Windows	October 16, 2012	Polarbit	
Intel Discovered	Xbox 360	October 16, 2012	Wahoo Studios	
Mark of the Ninja	Microsoft Windows	October 16, 2012	Klei Entertainment	
Forza Horizon	Xbox 360	October 23, 2012	Playground Games, Turn 10 Studios	
Deadlight	Microsoft Windows	October 25, 2012	Tequila Works	
Home Run Stars	Xbox 360	October 26, 2012	Smoking Gun Interactive	
Hydro Thunder Hurricane	Microsoft Windows	October 26, 2012	Vector Unit	
Microsoft Mahjong	Windows Phone	October 26, 2012	Arkadium	
Microsoft Minesweeper	Microsoft Windows	October 26, 2012	Arkadium	
Microsoft Solitaire Collection	Microsoft Windows	October 26, 2012	Arkadium	
Microsoft Solitaire Collection	Windows Phone	October 26, 2012	Arkadium	
Microsoft Ultimate Word Games	Microsoft Windows	October 26, 2012	You vs. the Internet	
Pinball FX2	Microsoft Windows	October 26, 2012	Zen Studios	
Rocket Riot 3D	Microsoft Windows	October 26, 2012	Codeglue	
Shuffle Party	Microsoft Windows	October 26, 2012	Babaroga	
Taptiles	Microsoft Windows	October 26, 2012	Microsoft Studios	
Toy Soldiers: Cold War	Microsoft Windows	October 26, 2012	Signal Studios	
Reckless Racing: Ultimate	Microsoft Windows	October 2012	Pixelbite	
Nike+ Kinect Training	Kinect	November 2, 2012	Sumo Digital, Ruffian Games	
Halo 4	Xbox 360	November 6, 2012	343 Industries, Certain Affinity, Digital Extremes	
Kinect Sports Gems: 3 Point Contest	Xbox 360	November 20, 2012	Rare	
Kinect Sports Gems: Darts vs. Zombies	Xbox 360	November 20, 2012	Rare	
Kinect Sports Gems: Ski Race	Xbox 360	November 20, 2012	Rare	
Ilomilo	Microsoft Windows	November 30, 2012	SouthEnd Interactive	
Red Bull Crashed Ice Kinect	Xbox 360	November 30, 2012	Bongfish	
AlphaJax	Windows Phone	December 4, 2012	Marker Metro	
Gerbil Physics	Windows Phone	December 7, 2012	Pencel Games	
The Wavy Tube Man Chronicles	Microsoft Windows	December 11, 2012	Twisted Pixel Games, Troma	
The Gunstringer: Dead Man Running	Microsoft Windows	December 14, 2012	Other Ocean Interactive	
Kinect Party	Kinect	December 18, 2012	Double Fine Productions	
Wordament	iOS	December 21, 2012	You vs. the Internet	
Kinect Sports Gems: Field Goal Contest	Xbox 360	December 25, 2012	Rare	
Kinect Sports Gems: Prize Driver	Xbox 360	December 25, 2012	Rare	
Kinect Sports Gems: Reaction Rally	Xbox 360	December 25, 2012	Rare	
Microsoft Mahjong	Microsoft Windows	December 27, 2012	Arkadium	
Skulls of the Shogun	Microsoft Windows	January 30, 2013	17-Bit, Buffalo Vision, Plush Apocalypse Productions	
Skulls of the Shogun	Xbox Live Arcade	January 30, 2013	17-Bit, Buffalo Vision, Plush Apocalypse Productions	
Skulls of the Shogun	Windows Phone	January 30, 2013	17-Bit, Buffalo Vision, Plush Apocalypse Productions	
Monsters Love Candy	Microsoft Windows	February 21, 2013	Other Ocean Interactive	
Disney Fairies: Hidden Treasures	Microsoft Windows	March 6, 2013	HitPoint Studios	
A World of Keflings	Microsoft Windows	March 12, 2013	NinjaBee	
Galactic Reign	Microsoft Windows	March 12, 2013	Slant Six Games	
Kinect Sports Gems: 10 Frame Bowling	Xbox 360	March 12, 2013	Rare	
Kinect Sports Gems: Penalty Saver	Xbox 360	March 12, 2013	Rare	
Kinect Sports Gems: Ping Pong	Xbox 360	March 12, 2013	Rare	
Galactic Reign	Windows Phone	March 13, 2013	Slant Six Games	
Gears of War: Judgment	Xbox 360	March 19, 2013	People Can Fly, Epic Games, Darkside Game Studios, Phosphor Games, Pitbull Studio	
Ms. Splosion Man	iOS	March 28, 2013	Iron Galaxy Studios	
BattleBlock Theater	Xbox Live Arcade	April 3, 2013	The Behemoth, Big Timber Studio	
Ms. Splosion Man	Microsoft Windows	April 3, 2013	Fire Hose Games, Panic Button	
Ms. Splosion Man	Windows Phone	April 3, 2013	Iron Galaxy Studios	
Age of Empires II: HD Edition	Microsoft Windows	April 9, 2013	Hidden Path Entertainment	
Motocross Madness	Xbox Live Arcade	April 10, 2013	Bongfish	
The Harvest	Microsoft Windows	May 2, 2013	Microsoft Studios	
Doritos Crash Course 2	Xbox Live Arcade	May 8, 2013	Behaviour Interactive	
Team Crossword	Microsoft Windows	May 14, 2013	Frima Studio	
Hydro Thunder: GO	Windows Phone	May 15, 2013	Pixelbite	
Dust: An Elysian Tail	Microsoft Windows	May 24, 2013	Humble Hearts	
CastleStorm	Xbox Live Arcade	May 29, 2013	Zen Studios	
State of Decay	Xbox Live Arcade	June 5, 2013	Undead Labs	
TY the Tasmanian Tiger	Microsoft Windows	June 18, 2013	Krome Studios	
Endless Skater	Microsoft Windows	June 19, 2013	SuperVillain Studios	
Field & Stream Fishing	Microsoft Windows	July 3, 2013	Merge Interactive	
Halo: Spartan Assault	Microsoft Windows	July 18, 2013	Vanguard Games, 343 Industries	
Halo: Spartan Assault	Windows Phone	July 18, 2013	Vanguard Games, 343 Industries	
AlphaJax	Microsoft Windows	July 29, 2013	Frima Studio	
Charlie Murder	Xbox Live Arcade	August 14, 2013	Ska Studios	
World Series of Poker: Full House Pro	Microsoft Windows	September 4, 2013	Pipeworks Studios	
World Series of Poker: Full House Pro	Xbox Live Arcade	September 4, 2013	Pipeworks Studios	
Ascend: Hand of Kul	Xbox Live Arcade	September 25, 2013	Signal Studios	
Wordament	Android	October 4, 2013	You vs. the Internet	
State of Decay	Microsoft Windows	November 5, 2013	Undead Labs	
Crimson Dragon	Kinect	November 22, 2013	Grounding	
Dead Rising 3	Xbox One	November 22, 2013	Capcom Vancouver	
Forza Motorsport 5	Xbox One	November 22, 2013	Turn 10 Studios, Playground Games	
Killer Instinct	Xbox One	November 22, 2013	Double Helix Games	
LocoCycle	Xbox One	November 22, 2013	Twisted Pixel Games	
Powerstar Golf	Xbox One	November 22, 2013	Zoë Mode	
Ryse: Son of Rome	Xbox One	November 22, 2013	Crytek, Crytek Hungary	
Xbox Fitness	Kinect	November 22, 2013	Sumo Digital	
Zoo Tycoon	Xbox 360	November 22, 2013	Frontier Developments	
Zoo Tycoon	Xbox One	November 22, 2013	Frontier Developments	
Minecraft: PlayStation 3 Edition	PlayStation 3	December 17, 2013	4J Studios	
Disney The Little Mermaid: Undersea Treasures!	Microsoft Windows	December 20, 2013	HitPoint Studios	
Max: The Curse of Brotherhood	Xbox One	December 20, 2013	Press Play	
Halo: Spartan Assault	Xbox One	December 24, 2013	Vanguard Games, 343 Industries	
Cold Alley	Microsoft Windows	December 27, 2013	Atypical Games	
Microsoft Minesweeper	Windows Phone	December 27, 2013	Arkadium	
Throne Together	Windows Phone	January 3, 2014	Rogue Rocket Games	
Halo: Spartan Assault	Xbox Live Arcade	January 31, 2014	Vanguard Games, 343 Industries	
Microsoft Bingo	Microsoft Windows	February 3, 2014	Microsoft Casual Games, Frima Studio	
Fable: Anniversary	Xbox 360	February 7, 2014	Lionhead Studios	
World of Tanks: Xbox 360 Edition	Xbox 360	February 12, 2014	Wargaming West	
LocoCycle	Microsoft Windows	February 14, 2014	Twisted Pixel Games	
LocoCycle	Xbox Live Arcade	February 14, 2014	Twisted Pixel Games	
Throne Together	Microsoft Windows	February 18, 2014	Rogue Rocket Games	
Kinectimals Unleashed	Microsoft Windows	March 7, 2014	Frontier Developments	
Warface	Xbox 360	March 26, 2014	Crytek Ukraine	
Kinect Sports Rivals	Kinect	April 8, 2014	Rare	
Wordament Snap Attack	Microsoft Windows	May 6, 2014	You vs. the Internet	
Wordament Snap Attack	Windows Phone	May 6, 2014	You vs. the Internet	
Age of Mythology: Extended Edition	Microsoft Windows	May 8, 2014	Ensemble Studios	
Tentacles: Enter The Dolphin	Android	May 8, 2014	Press Play	
QuizToWin	Android	May 9, 2014	Microsoft Game Studios	
QuizToWin	iOS	May 9, 2014	Microsoft Game Studios	
Max: The Curse of Brotherhood	Microsoft Windows	May 21, 2014	Press Play	
Max: The Curse of Brotherhood	Xbox Live Arcade	May 21, 2014	Press Play	
Microsoft Treasure Hunt	Microsoft Windows	June 4, 2014	Arkadium	
Secrets and Treasure: The Lost Cities	Microsoft Windows	June 4, 2014	Mediatonic	
Microsoft Sudoku	Microsoft Windows	June 25, 2014	Arkadium	
Rise of Nations: Extended Edition	Microsoft Windows	June 12, 2014	Big Huge Games, SkyBox Labs	
Wordament Snap Attack	iOS	July 3, 2014	You vs. the Internet	
Jet Car Stunts	Windows Phone	July 11, 2014	True Axis	
Microsoft Jigsaw	Microsoft Windows	July 11, 2014	Arkadium	
Magic 2015: Duels of the Planeswalkers	Xbox Live Arcade	July 16, 2014	Stainless Games	
Teenage Mutant Ninja Turtles: Training Lair	Kinect	July 22, 2014	Float Hybrid, Krome Studios	
Happy Wars	Microsoft Windows	July 23, 2014	Toylogic	
Wordament Snap Attack	Android	July 31, 2014	You vs. the Internet	
Tentacles: Enter the Mind	Microsoft Windows	August 20, 2014	Press Play	
Pinball FX2	Xbox One	October 14, 2014	Zen Studios	
Dance Central Spotlight	Kinect	September 2, 2014	Harmonix	
Minecraft: PlayStation 4 Edition	PlayStation 4	September 3, 2014	4J Studios	
Minecraft: Xbox One Edition	Xbox One	September 5, 2014	4J Studios	
Fable: Anniversary	Microsoft Windows	September 12, 2014	Lionhead Studios	
Age of Empires: Castle Siege	Microsoft Windows	September 17, 2014	Smoking Gun Interactive	
Age of Empires: Castle Siege	Windows Phone	September 17, 2014	Smoking Gun Interactive	
Forza Horizon 2	Xbox 360	September 30, 2014	Sumo Digital, Turn 10 Studios	
Forza Horizon 2	Xbox One	September 30, 2014	Playground Games, Turn 10 Studios	
Project Spark	Microsoft Windows	October 7, 2014	Team Dakota, SkyBox Labs	
Project Spark	Xbox One	October 7, 2014	Team Dakota, SkyBox Labs	
Minecraft: PlayStation Vita Edition	PlayStation Vita	October 14, 2014	4J Studios	
D4: Dark Dreams Don't Die	Xbox One	October 18, 2014	Access Games	
Voice Commander	Xbox One	October 22, 2014	Microsoft Foundry Intern Program	
Sunset Overdrive	Xbox One	October 28, 2014	Insomniac Games	
Magic 2015: Duels of the Planeswalkers	Xbox One	November 5, 2014	Stainless Games	
Halo: The Master Chief Collection	Xbox One	November 11, 2014	343 Industries, Blur Studio, Certain Affinity, Ruffian Games, Saber Interactive, United Front Games	
Kinectimals Unleashed	Android	November 28, 2014	Frontier Developments	
Kinectimals Unleashed	iOS	November 28, 2014	Frontier Developments	
Minecraft: Pocket Edition	Windows Phone	December 9, 2014	Mojang	
Kalimba	Xbox One	December 17, 2014	Press Play	
Microsoft Jackpot	Microsoft Windows	January 5, 2015	Arkadium	
ScreamRide	Xbox 360	February 16, 2015	Frontier Developments	
ScreamRide	Xbox One	March 3, 2015	Frontier Developments	
Ori and the Blind Forest	Microsoft Windows	March 11, 2015	Moon Studios	
Ori and the Blind Forest	Xbox One	March 11, 2015	Moon Studios	
Forza Horizon 2 Presents Fast & Furious	Xbox 360	March 27, 2015	Sumo Digital	
Forza Horizon 2 Presents Fast & Furious	Xbox One	March 27, 2015	Playground Games	
Halo: Spartan Assault	iOS	April 16, 2015	Vanguard Games, 343 Industries	
Halo: Spartan Strike	iOS	April 16, 2015	Vanguard Games, 343 Industries	
Halo: Spartan Strike	Microsoft Windows	April 16, 2015	Vanguard Games, 343 Industries	
Halo: Spartan Strike	Windows Phone	April 16, 2015	Vanguard Games, 343 Industries	
Kalimba	Microsoft Windows	April 22, 2015	Press Play	
State of Decay: Year-One Survival Edition	Xbox One	May 12, 2015	Undead Labs	
Age of Empires: Castle Siege	iOS	May 20, 2015	Smoking Gun Interactive	
World of Tanks	Xbox One	July 28, 2015	Wargaming West	
Rare Replay	Xbox One	August 4, 2015	Rare, 4th Kernel Studios, Code Mystics, Sprung Studios	
Gears of War: Ultimate Edition	Xbox One	August 25, 2015	The Coalition, Splash Damage	
Forza Motorsport 6	Xbox One	September 15, 2015	Turn 10 Studios	
Halo 5: Guardians	Xbox One	October 27, 2015	343 Industries	
Minecraft: Wii U Edition	Wii U	December 17, 2015	Mojang	
Cobalt	Microsoft Windows	February 2, 2016	Oxeye Game Studio	
Cobalt	Xbox Live Arcade	February 2, 2016	Oxeye Game Studio	
Cobalt	Xbox One	February 2, 2016	Oxeye Game Studio	
Gears of War: Ultimate Edition	Microsoft Windows	March 1, 2016	The Coalition	
Quantum Break	Microsoft Windows	April 5, 2016	Remedy Entertainment, Asobo Studio	
Quantum Break	Xbox One	April 5, 2016	Remedy Entertainment, Asobo Studio	
State of Decay: Year-One Survival Edition	Microsoft Windows	August 9, 2016	Undead Labs	
Forza Motorsport 6: Apex	Microsoft Windows	September 6, 2016	Turn 10 Studios	
Halo 5: Forge	Microsoft Windows	September 8, 2016	343 Industries, SkyBox Labs	
ReCore	Microsoft Windows	September 13, 2016	Armature Studio, Comcept, Asobo Studio	
ReCore	Xbox One	September 13, 2016	Armature Studio, Comcept, Asobo Studio	
Forza Horizon 3	Microsoft Windows	September 27, 2016	Playground Games, Blue Phoenix Software, Sumo Digital	
Forza Horizon 3	Xbox One	September 27, 2016	Playground Games, Blue Phoenix Software, Sumo Digital	
Gears of War 4	Microsoft Windows	October 11, 2016	The Coalition, Fireteam, Splash Damage, The Workshop	
Gears of War 4	Xbox One	October 11, 2016	The Coalition, Fireteam, Splash Damage, The Workshop	
Minecraft: Education Edition	Mac OS	November 1, 2016	Mojang	
Minecraft: Education Edition	Microsoft Windows	November 1, 2016	Mojang	
Microsoft Solitaire Collection	Android	November 18, 2016	Smoking Gun Interactive	
Microsoft Solitaire Collection	iOS	November 23, 2016	Arkadium	
Dead Rising 4	Xbox One	December 6, 2016	Capcom Vancouver	
Killer Instinct: Definitive Edition	Microsoft Windows	December 9, 2016	Iron Galaxy Studios	
Halo Wars: Definitive Edition	Xbox One	December 19, 2016	343 Industries, Ensemble Studios, Behaviour Interactive	
Halo Wars 2	Microsoft Windows	February 21, 2017	Creative Assembly, 343 Industries	
Halo Wars 2	Xbox One	February 21, 2017	Creative Assembly, 343 Industries	
Age of Empires: Castle Siege	Android	April 6, 2017	Smoking Gun Interactive	
Halo Wars: Definitive Edition	Microsoft Windows	April 20, 2017	343 Industries, Ensemble Studios, Behaviour Interactive	
Minecraft: Nintendo Switch Edition	Nintendo Switch	May 11, 2017	4J Studios, Mojang	
Phantom Dust	Microsoft Windows	May 16, 2017	Code Mystics	
Phantom Dust	Xbox One	May 16, 2017	Code Mystics	
Microsoft Ultimate Word Games	Microsoft Windows	June 6, 2017	Behaviour Interactive	
Minecraft: New Nintendo 3DS Edition	New Nintendo 3DS	September 13, 2017	Other Ocean Interactive	
Minecraft: Bedrock Edition	PlayStation 4	November 11, 2016	Mojang, SkyBox Labs, Virtuosity Consulting	
Minecraft: Bedrock Edition	Xbox One	November 11, 2016	Mojang, SkyBox Labs, Virtuosity Consulting	
Minecraft: Bedrock Edition	Android	November 11, 2016	Mojang, SkyBox Labs, Virtuosity Consulting	
Minecraft: Bedrock Edition	Microsoft Windows	November 11, 2016	Mojang, SkyBox Labs, Virtuosity Consulting	
Forza Motorsport 7	Microsoft Windows	October 3, 2017	Turn 10 Studios, Sumo Digital	
Forza Motorsport 7	Xbox One	October 3, 2017	Turn 10 Studios, Sumo Digital	
Halo: Recruit	Microsoft Windows	October 17, 2017	343 Industries, Endeavor One	
Disneyland Adventures	Microsoft Windows	October 31, 2017	Asobo Studio	
Disneyland Adventures	Xbox One	October 31, 2017	Asobo Studio	
Rush: A Disney Pixar Adventure	Microsoft Windows	October 31, 2017	Asobo Studio	
Rush: A Disney Pixar Adventure	Xbox One	October 31, 2017	Asobo Studio	
Zoo Tycoon: Ultimate Animal Collection	Microsoft Windows	October 31, 2017	Asobo Studio	
Zoo Tycoon: Ultimate Animal Collection	Xbox One	October 31, 2017	Asobo Studio	
Super Lucky's Tale	Microsoft Windows	November 7, 2017	Playful	
Super Lucky's Tale	Xbox One	November 7, 2017	Playful	
Age of Empires: Definitive Edition	Microsoft Windows	February 20, 2018	Ensemble Studios, Forgotten Empires, Tantalus Media	
Sea of Thieves	Microsoft Windows	March 20, 2018	Rare	
Sea of Thieves	Xbox One	March 20, 2018	Rare	
Forza Street	Microsoft Windows	May 8, 2018	Electric Square	
State of Decay 2	Microsoft Windows	May 22, 2018	Undead Labs, One Bit Labs	
State of Decay 2	Xbox One	May 22, 2018	Undead Labs, One Bit Labs	
PlayerUnknown's Battlegrounds	Xbox One	September 4, 2018	PUBG Corporation	
Minecraft: Education Edition	iOS	September 6, 2018	Mojang	
ReCore: Definitive Edition	Microsoft Windows	September 14, 2018	Comcept, Armature Studio	
Forza Horizon 4	Microsoft Windows	October 2, 2018	Playground Games	
Forza Horizon 4	Xbox One	October 2, 2018	Playground Games	
Sunset Overdrive	Microsoft Windows	November 16, 2018	Blind Squirrel Games	
Microsoft Wordament	Android	November 26, 2018	Behaviour Interactive	
Microsoft Wordament	iOS	November 26, 2018	Behaviour Interactive	
Crackdown 3	Microsoft Windows	February 15, 2019	Sumo Digital, Certain Affinity, Cloudgine, Elbow Rocket, Reagent Games, Ruffian Games	
Crackdown 3	Xbox One	February 15, 2019	Sumo Digital, Certain Affinity, Cloudgine, Elbow Rocket, Reagent Games, Ruffian Games	
Gears POP!	Android	August 22, 2019	Mediatonic	
Gears POP!	iOS	August 22, 2019	Mediatonic	
Gears POP!	Microsoft Windows	August 22, 2019	Mediatonic	
Gears 5	Microsoft Windows	September 10, 2019	The Coalition, Behaviour Interactive, Splash Damage	
Gears 5	Xbox One	September 10, 2019	The Coalition, Behaviour Interactive, Splash Damage	
Ori and the Blind Forest: Definitive Edition	Nintendo Switch	September 27, 2019	Moon Studios	
Minecraft Earth (Early Access)	Android	October 17, 2019	Mojang Studios	
Minecraft Earth (Early Access)	iOS	October 17, 2019	Mojang Studios	
Age of Empires II: Definitive Edition	Microsoft Windows	November 14, 2019	Forgotten Empires, Tantalus Media, Wicked Witch, World's Edge	
Halo: The Master Chief Collection	Microsoft Windows	December 3, 2019	343 Industries, Ruffian Games, Splash Damage	
Wasteland Remastered	Microsoft Windows	February 25, 2020	InXile Entertainment, Krome Studios	
Wasteland Remastered	Xbox One	February 25, 2020	InXile Entertainment, Krome Studios	
Ori and the Will of the Wisps	Microsoft Windows	March 11, 2020	Moon Studios	
Ori and the Will of the Wisps	Xbox One	March 11, 2020	Moon Studios	
Bleeding Edge	Microsoft Windows	March 24, 2020	Ninja Theory	
Bleeding Edge	Xbox One	March 24, 2020	Ninja Theory	
Gears Tactics	Microsoft Windows	April 28, 2020	Splash Damage, The Coalition	
Forza Street	Android	May 5, 2020	Electric Square	
Forza Street	iOS	May 5, 2020	Electric Square	
Minecraft Dungeons	Microsoft Windows	May 26, 2020	Mojang Studios, Double Eleven	
Minecraft Dungeons	Nintendo Switch	May 26, 2020	Mojang Studios, Double Eleven	
Minecraft Dungeons	PlayStation 4	May 26, 2020	Mojang Studios, Double Eleven	
Minecraft Dungeons	Xbox One	May 26, 2020	Mojang Studios, Double Eleven	
The Bard's Tale: Remastered and Resnarkled	Microsoft Windows	June 18, 2020	InXile Entertainment	
The Bard's Tale: Remastered and Resnarkled	Nintendo Switch	June 18, 2020	InXile Entertainment	
The Bard's Tale: Remastered and Resnarkled	Xbox One	June 18, 2020	InXile Entertainment	
Minecraft: Education Edition	Android	August 7, 2020	Mojang Studios	
Microsoft Flight Simulator	Microsoft Windows	August 18, 2020	Asobo Studio, Blackshark	
Battletoads	Microsoft Windows	August 20, 2020	Dlala Studios, Rare	
Battletoads	Xbox One	August 20, 2020	Dlala Studios, Rare	
Tell Me Why	Microsoft Windows	August 27, 2020	Dontnod Entertainment	
Tell Me Why	Xbox One	August 27, 2020	Dontnod Entertainment	
Age of Empires III: Definitive Edition	Microsoft Windows	October 15, 2020	Tantalus Media, World's Edge	
Forza Horizon 4	Xbox Series X/S	November 10, 2020	Panic Button	
Gears 5	Xbox Series X/S	November 10, 2020	The Coalition	
Gears Tactics	Xbox One	November 10, 2020	Splash Damage, The Coalition	
Gears Tactics	Xbox Series X/S	November 10, 2020	Splash Damage, The Coalition	
Ori and the Will of the Wisps	Xbox Series X/S	November 10, 2020	Moon Studios	
Sea of Thieves	Xbox Series X/S	November 10, 2020	Rare	
Halo: The Master Chief Collection	Xbox Series X/S	November 17, 2020	343 Industries	
State of Decay 2	Xbox Series X/S	December 2, 2020	Undead Labs	
Mahjong by Microsoft	iOS	December 15, 2020	Smoking Gun Interactive	
Mahjong by Microsoft	Android	December 15, 2020	Smoking Gun Interactive	
Age of Empires II: Definitive Edition – Lords of the West	Microsoft Windows	January 26, 2021	Forgotten Empires, Tantalus Media, Wicked Witch	
Microsoft Flight Simulator	Xbox Series X/S	July 27, 2021	Asobo Studio	
Psychonauts 2	Linux	August 25, 2021	Double Fine Productions	
Psychonauts 2	Mac OS	August 25, 2021	Double Fine Productions	
Psychonauts 2	Microsoft Windows	August 25, 2021	Double Fine Productions	
Psychonauts 2	PlayStation 4	August 25, 2021	Double Fine Productions	
Psychonauts 2	Xbox One	August 25, 2021	Double Fine Productions	
Psychonauts 2	Xbox Series X/S	August 25, 2021	Double Fine Productions	
Age of Empires IV	Microsoft Windows	October 28, 2021	Relic Entertainment, World's Edge	
Forza Horizon 5	Microsoft Windows	November 9, 2021	Playground Games	
Forza Horizon 5	Xbox One	November 9, 2021	Playground Games	
Forza Horizon 5	Xbox Series X/S	November 9, 2021	Playground Games	
Halo Infinite	Microsoft Windows	December 8, 2021	343 Industries, Certain Affinity, SkyBox Labs, Sperasoft, The Coalition	
Halo Infinite	Xbox One	December 8, 2021	343 Industries, Certain Affinity, SkyBox Labs, Sperasoft, The Coalition	
Halo Infinite	Xbox Series X/S	December 8, 2021	343 Industries, Certain Affinity, SkyBox Labs, Sperasoft, The Coalition	
As Dusk Falls	Microsoft Windows	July 19, 2022	Interior Night	
As Dusk Falls	Xbox One	July 19, 2022	Interior Night	
As Dusk Falls	Xbox Series X/S	July 19, 2022	Interior Night	
Forza Horizon 5: Hot Wheels	Microsoft Windows	July 19, 2022	Playground Games	
Forza Horizon 5: Hot Wheels	Xbox One	July 19, 2022	Playground Games	
Forza Horizon 5: Hot Wheels	Xbox Series X/S	July 19, 2022	Playground Games	
Grounded	Microsoft Windows	September 27, 2022	Obsidian Entertainment, Black Shamrock	
Grounded	Xbox One	September 27, 2022	Obsidian Entertainment, Black Shamrock	
Grounded	Xbox Series X/S	September 27, 2022	Obsidian Entertainment, Black Shamrock	
Age of Empires IV: Anniversary Edition	Microsoft Windows	October 25, 2022	Relic Entertainment, World's Edge	
Pentiment	Microsoft Windows	November 15, 2022	Obsidian Entertainment	
Pentiment	Xbox One	November 15, 2022	Obsidian Entertainment	
Pentiment	Xbox Series X/S	November 15, 2022	Obsidian Entertainment	
GoldenEye 007	Xbox One	January 12, 2023	Rare Ltd. and Code Mystic	
GoldenEye 007	Xbox Series X/S	January 12, 2023	Rare Ltd. and Code Mystic	
Age of Empires II: Definitive Edition	Xbox One	January 31, 2023	World's Edge, Tantalus Media	
Age of Empires II: Definitive Edition	Xbox Series X/S	January 31, 2023	World's Edge, Tantalus Media	
Forza Horizon 5: Rally Adventures	Microsoft Windows	March 29, 2023	Playground Games	
Forza Horizon 5: Rally Adventures	Xbox One	March 29, 2023	Playground Games	
Forza Horizon 5: Rally Adventures	Xbox Series X/S	March 29, 2023	Playground Games	
Minecraft Legends	Microsoft Windows	April 18, 2023	Mojang Studios, Blackbird Interactive	
Minecraft Legends	Nintendo Switch	April 18, 2023	Mojang Studios, Blackbird Interactive	
Minecraft Legends	PlayStation 4	April 18, 2023	Mojang Studios, Blackbird Interactive	
Minecraft Legends	PlayStation 5	April 18, 2023	Mojang Studios, Blackbird Interactive	
Minecraft Legends	Xbox One	April 18, 2023	Mojang Studios, Blackbird Interactive	
Minecraft Legends	Xbox Series X/S	April 18, 2023	Mojang Studios, Blackbird Interactive	
Age of Empires IV	Xbox One	August 22, 2023	World's Edge, Relic Entertainment	
Age of Empires IV	Xbox Series X/S	August 22, 2023	World's Edge, Relic Entertainment	
Forza Motorsport	Microsoft Windows	October 10, 2023	Turn 10 Studios	
Forza Motorsport	Xbox Series X/S	October 10, 2023	Turn 10 Studios	
Killer Instinct: Anniversary Edition	Microsoft Windows	November 28, 2023	Iron Galaxy Studios	
Killer Instinct: Anniversary Edition	Xbox Series X/S	November 28, 2023	Iron Galaxy Studios	
Pentiment	Nintendo Switch	February 22, 2024	Obsidian Entertainment	
Pentiment	PlayStation 4	February 22, 2024	Obsidian Entertainment	
Pentiment	PlayStation 5	February 22, 2024	Obsidian Entertainment	
Age of Empires II: Definitive Edition – Victors and Vanquished	Microsoft Windows	March 14, 2024	World's Edge	
Age of Empires II: Definitive Edition – Victors and Vanquished	Xbox Series X/S	March 14, 2024	World's Edge	
Grounded	Nintendo Switch	April 16, 2024	Obsidian Entertainment	
Grounded	PlayStation 4	April 16, 2024	Obsidian Entertainment	
Grounded	PlayStation 5	April 16, 2024	Obsidian Entertainment	
Sea of Thieves	PlayStation 5	April 30, 2024	Rare	
Senua's Saga: Hellblade II	Microsoft Windows	May 21, 2024	Ninja Theory	
Senua's Saga: Hellblade II	Xbox Series X/S	May 21, 2024	Ninja Theory	
Age of Mythology: Retold	Microsoft Windows	September 4, 2024	World's Edge	
Age of Mythology: Retold	Xbox Series X/S	September 4, 2024	World's Edge	
Ara: History Untold	Microsoft Windows	September 24, 2024	Oxide Games	
Age of Empires Mobile	IOS	October 17, 2024	Timi Studios, World's Edge	
Age of Empires Mobile	Android	October 17, 2024	Timi Studios, World's Edge	
Microsoft Flight Simulator 2024	Microsoft Windows	November 19, 2024	Asobo Studio	
Microsoft Flight Simulator 2024	Xbox Series X/S	November 19, 2024	Asobo Studio	
Avowed	Microsoft Windows	February 18, 2025	Obsidian Entertainment	
Avowed	Xbox Series X/S	February 18, 2025	Obsidian Entertainment	
Age of Mythology: Retold	PlayStation 5	March 4, 2025	World's Edge, Forgotten Empires	
South of Midnight	Microsoft Windows	April 8, 2025	Compulsion Games	
South of Midnight	Xbox Series X/S	April 8, 2025	Compulsion Games	
Forza Horizon 5	PlayStation 5	April 29, 2025	Playground Games, Panic Button	
Age of Empires II: Definitive Edition	PlayStation 5	May 6, 2025	Forgotten Empires, Tantalus Media	
Retro Classics	Windows	May 21, 2025	Antstream	
Retro Classics	Xbox One	May 21, 2025	Antstream	
Retro Classics	Xbox Series X/S	May 21, 2025	Antstream	
Hellblade: Senua's Sacrifice	PlayStation 5	August 12, 2025	Ninja Theory	
Senua's Saga: Hellblade II	PlayStation 5	August 12, 2025	Ninja Theory	
Gears of War: Reloaded	PlayStation 5	August 26, 2025	The Coalition, Sumo Digital, Disbelief	
Gears of War: Reloaded	Windows	August 26, 2025	The Coalition, Sumo Digital, Disbelief	
Gears of War: Reloaded	Xbox Series X/S	August 26, 2025	The Coalition, Sumo Digital, Disbelief	
Keeper	Windows	October 17, 2025	Double Fine	
Keeper	Xbox Series X/S	October 17, 2025	Double Fine	
Ninja Gaiden 4	PlayStation 5	October 21, 2025	Koei Tecmo, Team Ninja, PlatinumGames	
Ninja Gaiden 4	Windows	October 21, 2025	Koei Tecmo, Team Ninja, PlatinumGames	
Ninja Gaiden 4	Xbox Series X/S	October 21, 2025	Koei Tecmo, Team Ninja, PlatinumGames	
The Outer Worlds 2	PlayStation 5	October 29, 2025	Obsidian Entertainment	
The Outer Worlds 2	Windows	October 29, 2025	Obsidian Entertainment	
The Outer Worlds 2	Xbox Series X/S	October 29, 2025	Obsidian Entertainment	
Microsoft Flight Simulator 2024	PlayStation 5	December 8, 2025	Asobo Studio	
Avowed	PlayStation 5	February 17, 2026	Obsidian Entertainment	
Towerborne	PlayStation 5	February 26, 2026	Stoic	
Towerborne	Windows	February 26, 2026	Stoic	
Towerborne	Xbox Series X/S	February 26, 2026	Stoic	
South of Midnight	Nintendo Switch 2	March 31, 2026	Compulsion Games	
South of Midnight	PlayStation 5	March 31, 2026	Compulsion Games	
Kiln	PlayStation 5	April 13, 2026	Double Fine	
Kiln	Windows	April 13, 2026	Double Fine	
Kiln	Xbox Series X/S	April 13, 2026	Double Fine	
Forza Horizon 6	Windows	May 19, 2026	Playground Games, Turn 10 Studios	
Forza Horizon 6	Xbox Series X/S	May 19, 2026	Playground Games, Turn 10 Studios	
Halo: Campaign Evolved	PlayStation 5	July 28, 2026	Halo Studios	
Halo: Campaign Evolved	Windows	July 28, 2026	Halo Studios	
Halo: Campaign Evolved	Xbox Series X/S	July 28, 2026	Halo Studios	
Minecraft Dungeons II	Nintendo Switch	September 29, 2026	Mojang Studios	
Minecraft Dungeons II	Nintendo Switch 2	September 29, 2026	Mojang Studios	
Minecraft Dungeons II	PlayStation 5	September 29, 2026	Mojang Studios	
Minecraft Dungeons II	Windows	September 29, 2026	Mojang Studios	
Minecraft Dungeons II	Xbox Series X/S	September 29, 2026	Mojang Studios	
Gears of War: E-Day	Windows	October 6, 2026	The Coalition, People Can Fly	
Gears of War: E-Day	Xbox Series X/S	October 6, 2026	The Coalition, People Can Fly	
Forza Horizon 6	PlayStation 5	January 26, 2027	Playground Games, Turn 10 Studios	
Fable	PlayStation 5	February 23, 2027	Playground Games	
Fable	Windows	February 23, 2027	Playground Games	
Fable	Xbox Series X/S	February 23, 2027	Playground Games	
Clockwork Revolution	Windows	2027	inXile Entertainment	
Clockwork Revolution	Xbox Series X/S	2027	inXile Entertainment	
Senua	PlayStation 5	2027	Ninja Theory	
Senua	Windows	2027	Ninja Theory	
Senua	Xbox Series X/S	2027	Ninja Theory	
OD	TBA	TBA	Kojima Productions	
Physint	TBA	TBA	Kojima Productions	

== See also ==
- List of Microsoft Gaming video games
- List of backward-compatible games for Xbox One and Series X - Some Xbox 360 and original Xbox games may have been released on Xbox One and Xbox Series X/S via backwards compatibility.
- List of Bethesda Softworks video games - Microsoft Gaming acquired ZeniMax Media/Bethesda Softworks and those subsidiaries games are published by Bethesda.
- List of Activision video games, List of Blizzard Entertainment games and List of King games - Microsoft Gaming acquired Activision Blizzard King and those subsidiaries games are published by Activision, Blizzard Entertainment and King.
- List of Blizzard Entertainment video games
- List of Microsoft Games: 1979–2000
