= List of Xbox Live games on Windows 8.x =

This is a list of released and upcoming Xbox Live games for Windows 8 and Windows RT. The first wave of Windows 8 Xbox games list was announced by Xbox Live expert Major Nelson on August 31, 2012. All Xbox Live games on Windows 8 made available on the Windows Store and released on October 26, 2012, onwards. There are currently 50 (Upcoming games: 11; Existing games: 39) games on this list.

== Released games ==
Title	Developer	Publisher	North America	Europe	Asia	Microsoft exclusive^{N}
4 Elements II Special Edition	Microsoft Studios	Microsoft Studios	Yes	Yes	Yes	Yes
A World of Keflings	NinjaBee	Microsoft Studios	Yes	Yes	Yes	Yes
Adera: Episode 1	Microsoft Studios	Microsoft Studios	Yes	Yes	Yes	Yes
Adera: Episode 2	Microsoft Studios	Microsoft Studios	Yes	Yes	Yes	Yes
Adera: Episode 3	Microsoft Studios	Microsoft Studios	Yes	Yes	Yes	Yes
Adera: Episode 4	Microsoft Studios	Microsoft Studios	Yes	Yes	Yes	Yes
Adera: Episode 5	Microsoft Studios	Microsoft Studios	Yes	Yes	Yes	Yes
Angry Birds	Rovio Entertainment	Rovio Entertainment	Yes	Yes	Yes	No
Angry Birds Space	Rovio Entertainment	Rovio Entertainment	Yes	Yes	Yes	No
Angry Birds Star Wars	Rovio Entertainment	Rovio Entertainment	Yes	Yes	Yes	No
Asphalt 7: Heat	Gameloft	Gameloft	Yes	Yes	Yes	No
Asphalt 8: Airborne	Gameloft	Gameloft	Yes	Yes	Yes	No
Asphalt Overdrive	Gameloft	Gameloft	Yes	Yes	Yes	No
Big Buck Hunter Pro	Microsoft Studios	Microsoft Studios	Yes	Yes	Yes	Yes
BlazBlue: Calamity Trigger	Arc System Works	Arc System Works	Yes	Yes	Yes	No
Collateral Damage	Microsoft Studios	Microsoft Studios	Yes	Yes	Yes	Yes
Contre Jour	Mokus	Microsoft Studios	Yes	Yes	Yes	No
Disney Fairies	Disney Interactive Media Group	Microsoft Studios	Yes	Yes	Yes	Yes
Crash Course GO	Wanako Games/Behaviour Interactive	Microsoft Studios	Yes	Yes	Yes	Yes
Cut the Rope	ZeptoLab	ZeptoLab	Yes	Yes	Yes	No
Dragon's Lair	Digital Leisure	Digital Leisure	Yes	Yes	Yes	No
Endless Skater	SuperVillain Studios	Microsoft Studios	Yes	Yes	Yes	Yes
Field & Stream Fishing	Microsoft Studios	Microsoft Studios	Yes	Yes	Yes	Yes
Fruit Ninja	Halfbrick	Halfbrick	Yes	Yes	Yes	No
Gravity Guy	Miniclip	Miniclip	Yes	Yes	Yes	No
Hydro Thunder Hurricane	Vector Unit	Microsoft Studios	Yes	Yes	Yes	Yes
ilomilo plus	Southend Interactive	Microsoft Studios	Yes	Yes	Yes	Yes
iStunt 2	Miniclip	Miniclip	Yes	Yes	Yes	No
Jetpack Joyride	Halfbrick Studios	Halfbrick Studios	Yes	Yes	Yes	No
Kinectimals Unleashed	Microsoft Studios	Microsoft Studios	Yes	Yes	Yes	No
Microsoft Mahjong	Arkadium	Microsoft	Yes	Yes	Yes	Yes
Microsoft Minesweeper	Arkadium	Microsoft	Yes	Yes	Yes	Yes
Microsoft Solitaire Collection	Arkadium	Microsoft	Yes	Yes	Yes	Yes
Microsoft Sudoku	Arkadium	Microsoft	Yes	Yes	Yes	Yes
Microsoft Taptiles	Arkadium	Microsoft	Yes	Yes	Yes	Yes
Monster Island	Miniclip	Miniclip	Yes	Yes	Yes	Yes
Monsters Love Candy	Other Ocean	Microsoft Studios	Yes	Yes	Yes	No
Pac-Man Championship Edition DX	Namco Bandai Games	Namco Bandai Games	Yes	Yes	Yes	No
Pinball FX 2	Zen Studios	Microsoft Studios	Yes	Yes	Yes	Yes
Rayman Jungle Run	Pastagames	Ubisoft	Yes	Yes	Yes	No
Reckless Racing Ultimate	Polarbit	Microsoft Studios	Yes	Yes	Yes	No
Rocket Riot 3D	Codeglue	Microsoft Studios	Yes	Yes	Yes	No
Shark Dash	Gameloft	Gameloft	Yes	Yes	Yes	No
Skulls of the Shogun	17-BIT	Microsoft Studios	Yes	Yes	Yes	No
Snap Attack	You vs. the Internet	Microsoft Studios	Yes	Yes	Yes	Yes
Tentacles: Enter the Mind	Press Play	Microsoft Studios	Yes	Yes	Yes	No
The Gunstringer: Dead Man Running	Other Ocean Interactive	Microsoft Studios	Yes	Yes	Yes	Yes
Toy Soldiers Cold War: Touch Edition	Signal Studios	Microsoft Studios	Yes	Yes	Yes	Yes
TY the Tasmanian Tiger	Krome Studios	Microsoft Studios	Yes	Yes	Yes	No
Wordament	You vs. the Internet	Microsoft Studios	Yes	Yes	Yes	Yes
World Series of Poker: Full House Pro	Microsoft Studios	Microsoft Studios	Yes	Yes	Yes	Yes
Zombies	Babaroga	Twilight Creations Inc.	Yes	Yes	Yes	No

== See also ==
- List of Games for Windows titles
- List of Games for Windows – Live titles
- Windows Games on Demand

== Notes ==
^N Exclusive to one or more Microsoft platforms
