= Motocross Madness =

Motocross Madness may refer to:

- Motocross Madness (1998 video game), developed by Rainbow Studios
- Motocross Madness 2, released in 2000 and also developed by Rainbow Studios
- Motocross Madness (2013 video game), developed by Bongfish
