= Scrap Metal =

Scrap Metal may refer to:

- Scrap, discarded metal that is suitable for reprocessing
- Scrap Metal (band), an Australian rock band active in the 1980s and early 1990s
- Scrap Metal (video game), a combat-racing game by Slick Entertainment
- Scrapmetal (Transformers), a fictional character in the Transformers universe
- Scrap Metal, a 2026 album by Helix
