= Age of Booty =

2008 video game

- Developer: Certain Affinity
- Publisher: Capcom
- Director: Max Hoberman
- Designer: David Bowman
- Programmers: Paul Isaac, Peter Carter
- Platforms: Cloud (OnLive); Microsoft Windows; PlayStation 3; Xbox 360
- Release: Xbox 360 (XBLA); October 15, 2008; PlayStation 3 (PSN): NA: October 16, 2008; EU: November 27, 2008; Microsoft Windows; March 9, 2009
- Genre: Real-time strategy
- Modes: Single-player, multiplayer

Age of Booty is a 2008 real-time strategy video game developed by Certain Affinity and A.C.R.O.N.Y.M. Games, and published by Capcom for the Xbox 360, PlayStation 3, and Microsoft Windows. Set in the swashbuckling era, the game puts players in control of a pirate ship with the goal of looting and capturing towns for a pirate faction, while defeating enemy ships on the way.

== Gameplay ==
Gameplay largely revolves around the maneuvering of a boat around a sea. The sea is made up of hexagons called Hexes. The player controls the boat by selecting a hex for a destination. If the ship becomes adjacent to a hex containing an enemy ship, merchant ship, town, or settlement, it will automatically attack it with cannon fire. Cannon damage depends on the number of upgrades, but if more than one enemy is adjacent, the ship will split its fire, firing at a different one each time. The objective is to capture a specific number of towns, which is given in a mission briefing: the upper right corner of the screen displays the number of cities owned, the ones owned by enemies, and the target number. The Pirate Lair can never be conquered by enemies, but the mission will end in failure if the enemies conquer the target number of towns before the player.

To capture a town the player must be adjacent to it and bombard it until it has no health left; the town will continue to fire on the ship until the health is depleted. A town upgrade applies to both town health and cannon power. When health is depleted a "capture" bar shows, and when full the town will be conquered. If an enemy ship nears the town, the "capture" will be paused until one of the ships sinks or flees. Towns automatically heal adjacent ships of the same party, so a defending party has an advantage.

Typical gameplay screenshot

Players control a 3D avatar of a pirate ship with colored sails depending on which team they are on. Ships have three attributes that can be upgraded: speed, armor, and cannon—each of which can be upgraded up to three times. Speed determines how fast the player's ship sails, armor measures the amount of damage the ship can take before it is destroyed, and cannon measures the damage the ship can cause. The Cannon attribute is displayed over the ship as small circles under the life gauge. Upgrading attack strength also decreases speed.

In the game, players use different resources to upgrade their towns and ships. There are three different resource types: gold, wood, and rum. Four gold and two wood will upgrade a town, and four rum and two wood upgrades ships. Players can acquire resources by picking up boxes floating in the water, destroying enemy ships, plundering villages, using one of the four curses or capturing towns and using them to produce resources. Each town/village displays the resources it will produce with icons floating over its avatar. The player ship can only be upgraded in the Pirate Lair, but a town can be upgraded regardless of ship position.

In the waters, merchant ships are frequently spawned, who attack any nearby ship, regardless of flag. While they do not have strong firepower nor hard hull, they release a curse crate when sunk. The player can only have one curse at a time, so if the crate is salvaged, it will give either a curse from four different types or a random resource. The four curse types are:

- Bomb: Heavily damages anything within a hex, must be placed on an empty water hex
- Whirlpool: Warps a ship to a random part of the map
- Ghost Ship: Makes the player ship invisible until cannons are next fired
- Pilfer Monkey: Steals up to two resources of one type (Gold, Rum, or Wood) from an enemy depending on availability

There are seven different challenges for solo play, each featuring three differing maps of easy, medium and hard difficulty levels for a total of 21 single-player missions. Multiplayer features a four-player game mode (Dueling Duos), a six-player mode (Triple Trouble) and an eight-player mode (Four By Four), each of which divides players into two teams. There is also a Battle Royale mode pitting four teams of two players each against each other. Players can use voice chat to talk with their team. Capcom also added six additional maps available to download for free on PlayStation Network. The Xbox Live Arcade version includes Avatar support.

== Development ==
Designer Max Hoberman admitted that inspiration for the game came from Bungie's long-running April Fools' Day gag Pimps at Sea. An open beta version of the game went live on September 19, 2008 (International Talk Like a Pirate Day).

On December 4, 2008, three additional map packs were released at no cost.

== Reception ==
Reception

Aggregate score
Aggregator	Score		
Aggregator	PC	PS3	Xbox 360
Metacritic	70/100	74/100	76/100

Review scores
Publication	Score		
Publication	PC	PS3	Xbox 360
1Up.com	N/A	N/A	B
Eurogamer	N/A	N/A	7/10
GamePro	N/A	N/A	3.75/5
GameSpot	N/A	N/A	7/10
Giant Bomb	N/A	N/A	4/5
IGN	5.5/10	7.5/10	7.8/10
PlayStation Official Magazine – UK	N/A	6/10	N/A
Official Xbox Magazine (UK)	N/A	N/A	8/10
Official Xbox Magazine (US)	N/A	N/A	8/10
TeamXbox	N/A	N/A	8/10

The Xbox 360 version of Age of Booty received "generally favorable" reviews, while the PC and PlayStation 3 versions received "average" reviews, according to the review aggregation website Metacritic. Eurogamer said the game's single-player mode was "frustrating and poorly balanced", but added, "take it online and you've got something that's almost worth the 800-Point asking price." IT Reviews agreed, stating "It's cheaply priced and great fun to play online as the matches are quick and enjoyable, although the offline campaign is rather marred by the erratic computer AI."

The game was nominated for two Xbox Live Arcade 2008 awards: "Best Original Game" and "Best Competitive Multiplayer Game".
