= Space Ark =

2010 video game

- Developer(s): Strawdog Studios
- Publisher(s): Strawdog Studios
- Platform(s): Xbox 360 (XBLA), Windows
- Release: June 16, 2010
- Genre(s): Arcade
- Mode(s): Single-player, multiplayer

Space Ark is a single/multi player arcade video game developed by independent software developer Strawdog Studios for the Microsoft Xbox Live Arcade and PC. The game was announced in May 2009 and it was released on June 16, 2010.

== Gameplay ==
Space Ark features three game modes. Mission mode. The player plays through each planet in turn collecting all the DNA crystals, grabbing the bonus fruit and scooping up all the power ups and bonus level tokens, to maximize their high score and earn the elusive "Perfect" ranking. Complete each planet in turn to unlock further planets and allow access to additional Arkonauts.

Survival mode. The clock is counting down. The player must play through six levels, racing to unlock the exits as quickly as possible, before the timer hits zero. Time bonuses can be earned for playing well but the aim is to exit the level as fast as possible. Time remaining (plus bonuses) will be added up and this time will be available in the subsequent levels. Let the timer hit zero and it is game over.

Time Attack mode. the clock is ticking. Time attack is a race to set the fastest time possible, which can be compared to those of other players via the online leader board.

A split screen multi-player mode (same console/computer) is also available where two players compete to complete each level and win the game.

== Development ==
Space Ark was revealed in an IGN post mortem article about another Strawdog Studios game, Geon: Emotions. A teaser video trailer for Space Ark was included, which referred to the game under a working title of "Bounce".
