= Snap Attack =

2014 video game

Wordament Snap Attack
- Developer: You vs. the Internet
- Publisher: Microsoft Studios
- Platforms: Windows Phone, Windows 8.1 iOS, Android
- Release: May 6, 2014
- Genre: Word puzzle
- Mode: both

Snap Attack (or Wordament Snap Attack) was the second word puzzle game developed by You vs. the Internet and published by Microsoft Studios, the first of which was Wordament. The game was initially released for the Windows Phone and Windows 8.1 operating systems on May 6, 2014 as a free download from the respective app stores. The game was also available for iOS and Android devices. The name Snap Attack was trademarked on April 3, 2014. In March 2018, it was announced that Snap Attack would be shut down as of May 18 of that year.

== Gameplay ==
A game in progress. An example of a Single-Snap is the word "fur" on the board, and a Multi-Snap are the words "cops", "es", "er" and "ar". There are also special, high-scoring rounds like "Digram" as seen here.

Like Wordament, players simultaneously compete to get as many points as possible. The game is similar to the Scrabble board game where a board is given with fixed words and bonus tiles (letter and word multipliers) on the board, and seven movable tiles with letters on the "rack". Snap Attack's board is 8×7 squares, smaller than a traditional Scrabble board.

Points are earned by making "Snaps" - valid combinations of letters that form a word or words with the ones already found on the board. "Single-Snaps" are linear combinations of letters that form one word, while "Multi-Snaps" are combinations that form two or more words. Snaps are scored by first multiplying the value of tiles located on a letter multiplier, adding up the points of the tiles forming each valid word, multiplying the total points by any word multiplier crossed, and finally multiplying with a "number of tiles used" multiplier.

Players attempt to make as many high-scoring Snaps as they can find within a round, which lasts two and a half minutes. At the end of a round, a selection of top-scoring valid Snaps is displayed, followed by the results of all players in each round. The next round then automatically begins.

Like Wordament, each game runs 24 hours, meaning that players may enter the game in the middle of a round. The memorization of two-letter words is considered a useful skill in this game.
