= Dash of Destruction =

2008 video game

- Developer: NinjaBee
- Publisher: Microsoft Game Studios
- Platform: Xbox 360 (XBLA)
- Release: December 17, 2008
- Genre: Racing
- Modes: Single-player, multiplayer

Dash of Destruction (also known as Doritos Dash of Destruction) is a racing advergame developed by indie developer NinjaBee for the Xbox 360's Xbox Live Arcade service. It was released on December 17, 2008, for free. The concept originated from gamer Mike Borland, winner of Doritos-sponsored "Unlock Xbox" competition.

The game is regarded as the easiest game to earn all achievements and Gamerscore points out of all XBLA titles released. According to Giant Bomb, the game's twelve achievements can all be easily earned in under 20 minutes. The game references this several times in dialogue with the player, such as telling players to "get their Gamerscore on" and to "go on a Gamerscore rampage". The game is no longer available on the Xbox Live Marketplace, but can be re-downloaded if it was previously downloaded before it was taken off the Xbox Live Marketplace, the full game can also be found physically on Official Xbox Magazine demo disc #96.

== Gameplay ==
In Dash of Destruction, there are two modes of gameplay, both occurring on the same city maps. In one mode players play as a Doritos delivery truck, racing around town delivering Doritos. This is achieved by driving over Doritos bags. However, the player is doing this while a Tyrannosaurus rex is chasing them, attempting to eat the truck. It is a race to see if the player can make a certain number of deliveries before the T. rex can eat a certain number of trucks. In some levels, there is an additional truck, named the Rogue Delivery Truck, which attempts to steal the player's deliveries.

In the second mode, the player takes the role of the T. rex and must eat a certain number of delivery trucks before the trucks make a certain number of deliveries. In some levels, an additional T. rex is present on the map that attempts to eat the trucks before the player can eat them.

There are different modes in multiplayer, where the players can take the role of the T. rex, the Delivery Truck, or both. Multiplayer is limited to local multiplayer.

== See also ==
- King Games
- Yaris (video game)
- Harms Way
- Doritos Crash Course
