= Stoked (video game) =

2009 video game

- Developer: Bongfish
- Publishers: Destineer; Big Air Edition: NA: Destineer (X360); PAL: Bandai Namco Entertainment
- Series: Stoked Rider
- Platforms: Xbox 360, Windows
- Release: Xbox 360: NA: February 24, 2009; EU: October 2, 2009; AU: November 9, 2009; Big Air Edition: NA: November 24, 2009 (X360); EU: March 11, 2011; AU: June 2, 2011
- Genre: Snowboarding
- Modes: Single-player, multiplayer

Stoked is a snowboarding video game developed by Austrian-based Bongfish GmbH released for the Xbox 360 in 2009. It is the latest entry in the Stoked Rider snowboard game series. In 2009 an updated version, Stoked: Big Air Edition, which was also released for Xbox 360, and a Microsoft Windows version was released only for the PAL region in 2011.

It is the first game in the series to feature multiple mountains and real life sponsors. It also has real weather experience gameplay.

== Gameplay ==
Stoked features an adaptive system where the game recognizes "stylish" riding versus "hucker" riding; this affects the player's score if they are known for riding in one way. The original game features five different open mountains: Almirante Nieto, Mount Fuji, Diablerets, Mount Shuksan, and Alaska. Originally, the mountains are only ventured through set waypoints of a helicopter, but upon achieving a score of 50,000 points on a single run, the player will gain the helicopter license for that particular mountain, allowing them to designate their own drop points.

== Reception ==
Stoked

Aggregate score
Aggregator	Score
Metacritic	68/100

Review scores
Publication	Score
Famitsu	26/40
Game Informer	7.5/10
GameSpot	7.5/10
GamesRadar+	4/5
GamesTM	4/10
GameZone	7.5/10
IGN	6.9/10
Official Xbox Magazine (UK)	6/10
Official Xbox Magazine (US)	7.5/10
TeamXbox	7.1/10
411Mania	8.8/10
The A.V. Club	B

The game received "average" reviews according to the review aggregation website Metacritic. GameSpot noted "occasional unpredictable physics" but Stoked said it was "blast, and considering that this wealth of content is going for a bargain price, it's an easy choice for boarders looking for a virtual outlet for their shredding fantasies." IGN said that "touches like snazzy weather effects, cool challenges online and (eventually) in single-player [would] please the diehard boarders out there." In Japan, where the game was ported for release and published by Russel on January 28, 2010, Famitsu gave it a score of one six, two sevens, and one six for a total of 26 out of 40.

== Big Air Edition ==
After the success of the original Stoked and the release of the game in European markets, Bongfish released an expanded version of the title called Stoked: Big Air Edition. Big Air Edition adds two new mountains, Laax and K2, to the original roster of five as well as including an upgraded frame rate and enhanced snow particles. The game also includes marked paths down the mountain and brand new racing events that will pit riders against each other, in addition to groomed terrain park area. It was also announced that brand new 2010 gear and clothing would be included from major brands. The PAL version and Microsoft Windows release also include bonus video features from Absinthe Films.

=== Reception ===
Stoked: Big Air Edition

Aggregate score
Aggregator	Score
Metacritic	72/100

Review scores
Publication	Score
1Up.com	A−
Famitsu	26/40
GamePro	4.5/5
GamesRadar+	4/5
GameZone	8/10
IGN	7.8/10
Official Xbox Magazine (US)	8/10
TeamXbox	7.4/10

The Xbox 360 version received "average" reviews, albeit a bit more positive than the original Stoked, according to Metacritic. In Japan, where the same console version was also ported for release and published by Russel on January 13, 2011, Famitsu also gave it a score of 26 out of 40.
