= Strawdog Studios =

UK video game developer

Strawdog Studios Ltd
- Company type: Private
- Industry: Interactive Entertainment; Video games Software Development
- Founded: 2003
- Headquarters: Derby, England
- Area served: Worldwide
- Products: Geon; Turbo Duck; Space Ark
- Number of employees: 16
- Website: www.strawdogstudios.com

Strawdog Studios Ltd. is a video game developer based in Derby, United Kingdom. The studio was established in 2003 and develops games and applications for mobile phone, iOS, Android, PC, PlayStation 3, Xbox 360, Wii, PlayStation Portable, and Nintendo DS.

== History ==
In 2007, Strawdog Studios released their first original title Geon: Emotions on Xbox Live Arcade (XBLA). This initial version of the game focused on multiplayer competition with each player's capabilities based around an 'emotions' theme. It featured single player or split-screen two-player modes as well as 2-4 multiplayer online modes over Xbox Live.

In September 2008, the studio released a new 'definitive' version of Geon for PS3 with Wii and PC versions to follow in 2009. The updated version features many improvements over the original, with stronger single player modes, tighter gameplay rules, and a much simpler fusion of the emotions and powerballs theme.

In March 2009, the company announced that it would be expanding into iPhone/iPod Touch development. In April 2009, the company released their first iPhone/iPod Touch game Turbo Duck.

The studio's first self-published original title Space Ark, was released on 16 June 2010 on Xbox Live Arcade.

More recently the studio has developed the official Peppa Pig and Fireman Sam iOS apps. All of which have received positive reviews and reached the #1 top-grossing app slot at some point since their release.

The studio continues to focus on games and applications with universal appeal and family values.

== Games ==
Game title	Platform(s)	Published by	Released
Geon: Emotions	Xbox 360	Eidos Interactive	September 19, 2007
Geon	PlayStation 3	Eidos Interactive	September 25, 2008
Turbo Duck	iOS	Strawdog Studios	April 1, 2009
Geon Cube	Wii	UFO Interactive Games	November 2009
Geon HD	iOS	Strawdog Studios, Chillingo	April 2010
Space Ark	Xbox 360, PC	Strawdog Studios	June 2010
Geon	iOS	Strawdog Studios, Chillingo	August 2010
Peppa Pig: Happy Mrs Chicken	iOS	P2 Games	September 2010
Peppa Pig: Polly Parrot	iOS	P2 Games	October 2010
Peppa Pig: Theme Park Fun:	Nintendo DS	P2 Games	March 2011
Peppa Pig: Peppa's Party Time	iOS	P2 Games	May 2011
Peppa Pig: Happy Mrs Chicken	Symbian	P2 Games	August 2010
Fireman Sam: Junior Cadet	iOS	P2 Games	November 2011
Pocket Festival	iOS	Chillingo	2012
Mr. Men: Mishaps & Mayhem	iOS, Android	P2 Games	September 16, 2015
Times Tables Adventure	iOS, Android	TBC	2016
Eden: The Game	iOS, Android	All 4 Games	2016
Simon's Cat: Crunch Time	iOS, Android	Tactile Games	2017
