= Geon: Emotions =

2007 video game

- Developer: Strawdog Studios
- Publisher: Eidos Interactive
- Platform: Xbox 360
- Release: September 19, 2007
- Genre: Arcade
- Modes: Single-player, multiplayer

Geon
- Developer: Strawdog Studios
- Publisher: Eidos Interactive (PSN) UFO Interactive Games (Wii - North America)
- Platforms: PlayStation 3 (PSN), Wii
- Release: NA: September 25, 2008; PAL: October 2, 2008; Wii: (Geon Cube): NA: October 27, 2009
- Genre: Arcade
- Modes: Single-player, Multiplayer

Geon: Emotions is a multiplayer-oriented action arcade video game developed by independent software developer Strawdog Studios for the Xbox 360 Xbox Live Arcade service. The title was announced during Microsoft's E3 2007 press conference and was released September 19, 2007 on Xbox Live Arcade.

An updated and enhanced version of the game (entitled Geon) was also released in the fall of 2008 on PlayStation Network. A Wii version of the game, titled Geon Cube, was physically released in North America on October 27, 2009.

== Gameplay ==
Geon is a fast-paced arcade game that requires players to take control of an emotionally themed cube and direct it around a semi-transparent grid. The cube collects the pellets and the aim of the game is to fill the cube with pellets and then deposit them in your opponent's goal. The aim is to score five 'goals' against the opponent (either human or computer controlled) before they do.

Each grid has two sides, and the game begins with players being placed on opposite sides of the grid. Players are not restricted to their 'home' side, and may traverse to the edge of the grid to 'flip' over to their opponents side at any time.

In order to score a goal, each cube must first be 'charged' with energy. This is achieved by collecting small pellets of energy ('emotes') that are distributed over each grid in a manner similar to Pac-Man. Once charged, the player is unable to collect further pellets and must attempt to score a goal by landing on the central goal area on their opponents side of the grid.

Players cannot collect their opponents pellets, so in order to gain an advantage in the competition, players can collect and deploy the various 'powerballs' that are available on the grids. Powerballs are also themed by emotion and hence some powerballs are offensive and disrupt an opponent's progress, where others are more defensive. In addition to these emotion specific powerballs the Geon cube has a shield and a jump attack, which can be used to disrupt your opponents collecting (the shield and attack were new to Geon and were not in the original Geon: Emotions released for XBLA).

Single player mode features two modes: Duel, where the player faces an AI opponent, and Time Attack where grids are played in sequence and the player must beat the computer and win the game within a target time to win awards and unlock mini-games.

The game features split-screen and Xbox-Live or PlayStation Network-based multiplayer gameplay which allows players to play against one another in the Duel mode, or one of the two multiplayer-exclusive modes: Team Geon, where two teams of two players play against each other in a 4-way split-screen match. The Last Man Standing mode pits four players against each other to score goals. In each round, the last player to score a goal is eliminated.

=== Emotions ===
Each player chooses from one of eight emotions, which each have their own soundtrack, color, and unique effect on a powerball they have an affinity with.
The emotions are as follows; Rage, Fear, Envy, Melancholy, Bliss, Courage, Passion, and Rapture. Only Rage and Passion are usable in the trial version. The powerballs are as follows: Jumpbash, Obscure, Vortex, Extract, Snakeit, Shield, Powerslide, and Speedup

- Jumpbash punches through the ground, damaging the enemy emotion and forcing them to lose emotes, which sets them back. Rage has a stronger hit in a wider area.
- Obscure blinds the enemy to your side of the field, hiding your movements from them, which is useful if you want to attack or defend against an emotion. Fear's Obscure lasts much longer and covers a majority of the field.
- Vortex sucks in surrounding emotes. If the player chooses Envy, Vortex lasts longer with a wider range.
- Extract lays a trap, holding the enemy emotion if they pass over it. When Melancholy uses Extract, the trap is deeper and lasts longer.
- Snakeit leaves a trail behind you that will harm the enemy emotion if they pass through it. When Bliss uses Snakeit, the enemy emotion takes more damage and the trail lasts longer.
- Shield protects the user from attacks from the enemy emotion. Courage's Shield lasts longer than the rest.
- Powerslide dashes quickly in a straight line, which can bash the enemy emotion. Passion's Powerslide is faster, goes further, and has more force.
- Speedup dramatically increases your emotion's speed. Rapture doubles the Speedup bonus.

=== Grids ===
The game contains 32 unique 2-player grids, that reveal a variety of obstacles like loops, bounce pads, lifts, platforms and switches.

There are an additional four grids specifically for 4-player games.

== Geon HD ==
GEON HD
- Developer: Strawdog Studios
- Publisher: Chillingo Ltd
- Platform: iPad
- Release: April 1, 2010
- Genre: Arcade
- Mode: Single-player

Geon HD is an action arcade video game developed for the Apple iPad by independent software developer Strawdog Studios. Geon HD is a version specifically designed for the iPad to make use of the formats touch screen control scheme.

=== Time Attack Mode ===
In Time Attack Mode, the player must roll a GEON cube around the play area in order to collect all the pellets and score five goals in the fastest possible time. The player may deploy the unique abilities of various powerballs (power-ups) to give themselves a competitive edge in collecting.

=== Mini Game Mode ===
In Mini Game Mode, the player must tackle a selection of mini games in which they must use the cube to collect pellets while avoiding hazards/enemies.

== See also ==
- Marble Blast Ultra
- Switchball
