= Bongfish =

Video game developer from Austria

Bongfish GmbH is a video game developer and publisher in Graz, Austria. Originally founded as a start-up in the science incubator of Graz University of Technology, the company was established in its current form in 2007.

== History ==
Bongfish published its first video game, Stoked for Xbox 360, in 2009. A year later, 2010, Harms Way was the first title by Bongfish developed for Microsoft Studios. This was followed up in 2012 with the title Red Bull Crashed Ice Kinect on the Xbox 360 console for Red Bull Media House and Microsoft Studios. With Motocross Madness, a third title was published for the Xbox 360 in 2013.

In 2015, Bongfish started a co-development partnership with Wargaming to create game-play features and content for their MMO World of Tanks and their Frontline game mode. Together with Flashman Games LLC, Bongfish acquired the rights to produce Smurfs' Village a social mobile game based on the Smurfs franchise in 2016.

In 2019, Bongfish founded Blackshark.ai, a sub-division of the company focusing on geospatial analytics and spatial computing. In 2020, Blackshark.ai was mentioned as the company that generated the world's surface for the Microsoft Flight Simulator utilizing Bing images.

== Titles published ==
- Stoked
- Stoked - Big Air Edition
- Motocross Madness
- Harms Way
- Diving Champions, official mobile game of the 2016 Summer Olympics in Rio de Janeiro
- Red Bull Racers
- Red Bull Crashed Ice Kinect
- Ski Slopestyle Challenge, official mobile game of the 2014 Winter Olympics in Sochi
- Calibre 10 Racing
- Smurfs' Village
- World of Tanks: Frontline
