= Kinect Joy Ride =

2010 video game

- Box art of Kinect Joy Ride
- Developer: BigPark
- Publisher: Microsoft Game Studios
- Platform: Xbox 360
- Release: NA: November 4, 2010; EU: November 10, 2010; AU: November 18, 2010
- Genre: Racing game
- Modes: Single player, Multiplayer

Kinect Joy Ride is a racing game for Xbox 360 and a launch title for its Kinect hardware in 2010. The game was developed by BigPark and published by Microsoft Game Studios.

== Gameplay ==
Playing as a person's Avatar, the game is controlled by the player holding their arms out as if they are grabbing an invisible steering wheel, and turning them in such a manner to steer. Pushing hips forward allows the player to drift, while pulling the 'wheel' towards the player and then pushing forward produces a chargeable turbo boost. While airborne, players can perform various tricks such as twists and spins for extra points. As players progress, they will earn fans, which unlock content, such as new tracks and game modes. Game modes include Races, Battles, Stunt, Trick modes and more. The game can be played with either two players locally or up to eight players online via Xbox Live (internet connection required for Xbox Live Multiplayer). Two free downloadable content packages are available which provide players with stylized versions of the Chevrolet Camaro, Cruze, Corvette and Volt.

== Development and release ==
Formerly known simply as Joyride, the game was initially announced at E3 2009 with the intention of it being released as a free Xbox Live Arcade title later that year. However it was eventually moved to 2010 and was made into a full retail title for the Kinect hardware.

== Reception ==
Kinect Joy Ride

Aggregate scores
Aggregator	Score
GameRankings	56.59%
Metacritic	52/100

Review scores
Publication	Score
Eurogamer	5/10
Game Informer	7/10
GameSpot	6.5/10
GamesRadar+	4/10
GameTrailers	5.4/10
IGN	6/10
Official Xbox Magazine (US)	4/10

The game has received mixed reviews from critics. The game received a rating of 6/10 from IGN, criticizing the loose controls and inconsistencies with the boost mechanic. Most reviewers agreed that, although Kinect Joy Ride offered lightweight fun, it was not a very satisfying game compared to the other launch titles, and easily forgettable. Video game talk show Good Game's two presenters gave the game a 5 and 4 out of 10 stating that the steering felt too unreliable and that it would be a lot more fun if were played with a regular controller and it is an experiment gone wrong. As well saying "You can have SOME fun pretending to drive, but I don't want to have to pretend to have fun too."

== See also ==
- Joy Ride Turbo
