= Joy Ride Turbo =

2012 video game

- Developer: BigPark
- Publisher: Microsoft Studios
- Platform: Xbox 360 (XBLA)
- Release: May 23, 2012
- Genre: Kart racing game
- Modes: Single player, Multiplayer

Joy Ride Turbo is a kart racing game developed by BigPark and published by Microsoft Studios for the Xbox 360. The sequel to Kinect Joy Ride, the player controls their avatar as they drive vehicles in a combat racing tournament. Unlike its predecessor, Joy Ride Turbo does not use the Kinect peripheral. Originally outed via a rating on the Australian Classification Board on April 11, 2012, it was unveiled by Microsoft Studios on April 27 and released on May 23, 2012. It was later added as one of the first 100 titles on the Xbox One backwards compatibility list on November 9, 2015.

Upon release, Joy Ride Turbo was met with mixed reviews from critics. Reviewers gave high praise to the game's stunt parks, but cited the series' spotted development past as the cause for many of the game's issues. Critics further noted that the game made good use of the Xbox 360 player avatars, with one review specifically mentioning the animations as a high point of commentary. The use of gamepad controller instead of the Kinect peripheral was met with high praise, and many reviewers noted that the game had strong controls.

== Gameplay ==
Joy Ride Turbo combines elements from other kart racing games such as powerups, split-screen multiplayer, and combat racing.

Joy Ride Turbo is a kart racing game similar to the Mario Kart series. The game is controlled using the Xbox 360 controller, unlike its predecessor, Kinect Joy Ride, which utilized the Kinect peripheral. The player's avatar is used as the race driver, whilst computer-controlled characters have system generated avatars that are created randomly. Eight competitors race in a circuit, with powerups littered across the game's several race tracks. These powerups can be offensive, such as rockets, which can be fired at racers in front of the player, defensive, such as a shield, or simply provide a temporary charge in speed. Each of the game's tracks have multiple pathways to complete the course, with longer tracks having more diverse routes. While airborne the player can perform various tricks by moving the controller's analog sticks, which in turn fill their boost meter. Boost is stored in tiers, and each tier brings a more powerful effect when used.

The player can select one of 42 fictional cars which are stylized based on several vehicle tropes such as muscle cars, tuner cars, the Volkswagen Type 2 van, and Hot rod roadsters. Each vehicle has several colors to choose from, and can be customized with parts hidden in each of the game's tracks. Players progress by winning championships, which consist of three to four races. Each championship has three difficulty levels to choose from, and higher difficulty levels provide greater rewards. Performing well in races also earns coins, which can be used to unlock alternate paint colors for vehicles, additional variants of existing vehicles, or new cars entirely. All tracks can be played in a free play mode outside of championship racing. Two open-world areas, known as Stunt Parks, are also included in which the player can search for additional collectables or simply practice their skills. All game modes can be played locally with up to four players via split-screen or with up to eight players online via Xbox Live."

== Development ==
While Joy Ride Turbo is viewed as a direct sequel to Kinect Joy Ride, its roots span back to E3 2009. Known at the time simply as Joyride, the game was initially announced with the intention of it being released as a free-to-play Xbox Live Arcade title later that year. Joyride Producer Andy Lang stated that players would be able to use Microsoft Points to "enhance [their] experience." At the time the game featured various modes, including an unreleased team mode. In this mode racers would be split into two teams, and the winning player would claim the victory for their entire team. Additionally the Stunt Park areas shown in the E3 demo allowed for spontaneous checkpoint races to be played, another feature which was cut from the final game. The game was eventually pushed back to 2010 and was made into a full retail title for the Kinect hardware under the name Kinect Joy Ride. Joy Ride Turbo was later outed via a rating on the Australian Classification Board on April 11, 2012. It was officially announced by Microsoft Studios on April 27, 2012. It was released on May 23, 2012, and later added as one of the first 100 titles on the Xbox One backwards compatibility list on November 9, 2015.

== Reception ==
Kinect Joy Ride

Aggregate scores
Aggregator	Score
GameRankings	68.21%
Metacritic	67/100

Review scores
Publication	Score
Electronic Gaming Monthly	7.5/10
Eurogamer	6/10
Game Informer	7/10
Official Xbox Magazine (UK)	7/10
Destructoid	5/10

Joy Ride Turbo received mixed reviews from critics. It holds an aggregate score of 68.21% at GameRankings and 67/100 at Metacritic. The highest score reported was that of an 80% approval from websites Strategy Informer and Worth Playing, while the lowest was a 50% from the website Destructoid. The week following its release it placed seventh in weekly total sales for Xbox Live Arcade games. It stayed in the top 20 games in weekly sales for five months, and ranked sixth in weekly sales in November 2012. It returned to the top 20 weekly sales in October 2013, where it placed 19th.

Game Informer's Jeff Cork noted that the game was a slight improvement over its predecessor, Kinect Joy Ride. Destructoid's Ian Bonds stated that while Joy Ride Turbo "isn't a good game, it's not a bad game, either." He further went on to criticize the need to pick up vehicle-specific parts, and noted that it was frustrating to have multiple parts for multiple vehicles, but not a complete set for any one vehicle. Christian Dolan of Eurogamer cited the game's spotted past as the source of many of its issues. He did note that the game's Stunt Parks were "clever places" where the player "never hit a dead end, never have to reverse, and never feel like [they've] taken the wrong turn."

Paul Semel of Electronic Gaming Monthly praised the game's light-hearted, cartoon atmosphere. He noted that the game had a strong sense of speed and "the tight controls to handle it." Semel felt that while the game was enjoyable, it was too easy to play, and that it could have issues keeping players engaged for the long term. Dave Rudden, a reviewer from Official Xbox Magazine US had similar opinions. Of the game's length they stated that it "runs out of value far too quickly." He further expressed frustrations that the minigames from Kinect Joy Ride were excluded. Rudden did note that the gameplay was improved using a gamepad instead of the Kinect peripheral used in its predecessor.
