= Certain Affinity =

American video game development studio

- Company type: Subsidiary
- Industry: Video games
- Founded: August 25, 2006; 19 years ago
- Founder: Max Hoberman
- Headquarters: Austin, Texas, US
- Number of locations: 2 (2019)
- Key people: Max Hoberman (President); Stephanie Letendre (VP Finance); Mojdeh Gharbi (VP Business Ops and Marketing)
- Number of employees: 180+ (2024)
- Parent: Keywords Studios (2024–present)
- Subsidiaries: Certain Affinity Toronto
- Website: www.certainaffinity.com

Certain Affinity is an American video game development studio based in Austin, Texas. It was founded in 2006 by Max Hoberman and a small number of other ex-Bungie employees and other industry veterans. On October 18, 2024, Certain Affinity was acquired by Keywords Studios.

== History ==
Certain Affinity's creation was announced in December 2006. The studio was founded by ex-Bungie employee Max Hoberman. In addition to staff from Bungie, it also includes ex-members of companies such as Microsoft, Red Storm, Origin, Electronic Arts, Digital Anvil, NCSoft, and the now-defunct Midway Austin and Ion Storm Austin.

The studio's first work was in creating two additional multiplayer levels for the popular Xbox game Halo 2. These maps, called "Tombstone" and "Desolation" (which comprised the "Blastacular Map Pack") were the last Halo 2 maps to be released; they are remakes of levels from the original Halo, called "Hang 'Em High" and "Derelict" respectively. They were released for Halo 2 on the Xbox Live on April 17, 2007. These maps were not released for Halo 2 Vista, but were replaced with two new maps exclusive to Halo 2 Vista: "District" and "Uplift". Certain Affinity worked closely with members of Bungie and Microsoft Game Studios during the development of these two maps.

Certain Affinity started working on another project in November 2006, which was revealed to be an unannounced original IP game in the action role-playing game genre.

Certain Affinity's first original game was Age of Booty, a downloadable real-time strategy game released on Steam, Xbox Live Arcade and PlayStation Network. The title was published by Capcom on October 15, 2008.

The company helped Valve port Left 4 Dead to the Xbox 360.

In 2009, the company announced the completion of Halo Waypoint, developed in conjunction with 343 Industries.

The company worked on the "Defiant Map Pack" for Halo: Reach, released on March 15, 2011.

The company announced its new game, due to release in summer 2011, called Crimson Alliance, at RTX 2011.

Certain Affinity also partnered with 343 Industries again for the development of Halo: Combat Evolved Anniversary, which was released exclusively for Xbox 360 on November 15, 2011.

At RTX 2012, Certain Affinity announced that the studio was working with 343 Industries again on developing the Forge map-making tools for Halo 4.

At RTX 2014, Certain Affinity showed off its involvement in Halo: The Master Chief Collection with the reveal of one of the six remade Halo 2 maps, Coagulation, along with a new vehicle, the Gungoose.

In 2017, Leyou Tech invested $10 million in Certain Affinity to develop an original game.

In March 2024, it was announced that Certain Affinity would be laying off 25 employees, or 10% of the company's workforce.

On October 18, 2024, Certain Affinity was acquired by Keywords Studios. The acquisition include a team of 180 employees based in the U.S. and Canada. Certain Affinity will continue to operate under its current leadership, including CEO Max Hoberman and President and COO Paul Sams.

== Games ==
Year	Title	Additional information	Platform
2007	Halo 2	Multiplayer DLC (Blastacular Map Pack)	Microsoft Windows, Xbox 360
2008	Age of Booty		Microsoft Windows, PlayStation Network, Xbox Live Arcade
2008	Call of Duty: World at War	Multiplayer and Multiplayer DLC	Microsoft Windows, PlayStation 3, Wii, Xbox 360
2008	Left 4 Dead	Assisting development	Xbox 360
2009	Halo Waypoint	Co-developed with 343i	Xbox 360
2010	Call of Duty: Black Ops	Multiplayer DLC	Microsoft Windows, PlayStation 3, Xbox 360
2011	Halo: Reach	Multiplayer DLC (Defiant Map Pack)	Xbox 360
2011	Crimson Alliance		Xbox Live Arcade
2011	Halo: Combat Evolved Anniversary	Co-developed with 343i	Xbox 360
2012	Halo 4	Co-developed with 343i	Xbox 360
2013	Call of Duty: Ghosts	Multiplayer and Multiplayer DLC	Microsoft Windows, PlayStation 3, PlayStation 4, Wii U, Xbox 360, Xbox One
2014	Halo: The Master Chief Collection	Multiplayer	Xbox One
2014	Age of Booty Tactics	Multiplayer	iOS
2016	Doom	Multiplayer co-developed with id Software	Microsoft Windows, PlayStation 4, Xbox One
2016	Call of Duty: Modern Warfare Remastered	Co-developed with Raven Software, High Moon Studios and Beenox	Microsoft Windows, PlayStation 4, Xbox One
2021	Halo Infinite	Co-developed with 343i	Microsoft Windows, Xbox One, Xbox Series X
TBA	Last Expedition		TBA
TBA	Project: Loro	A new original FPS game	TBA
TBA	Exodus	Co-developed with Archetype Entertainment	TBA
Cancelled	Transformers: Reactivate	Passed off to Splash Damage	PC, consoles
