= IBlast Moki =

2009 puzzle video game

iBlast Moki
- Developer: Godzilab
- Platforms: iOS, Android
- Release: September 18, 2009
- Genre: Puzzle

iBlast Moki is an iOS and Android puzzle game developed by French studio Godzilab and released on September 18, 2009. A sequel called iBlast Moki 2 was released on August 18, 2011.

== Gameplay ==
The game includes over 70 physics-based puzzle levels which require the player to place bombs on the screen that will push creatures, known as Mokis, into a goal. A level editor is also available in both the original game and the sequel, which allows users to create and share their own levels.

== Critical reception ==
=== iBlast Moki ===
The game has a rating of 94% on Metacritic based on 9 critic reviews.

Appspy said the game was "A great title that offers a wide range of levels and lots game content to keep you entertained for a long time. " NO DPad wrote "iBlast Moki is the most complete game I have ever encountered. Period. There's no other game that rivals in quality and quantity, a mixture that's absolutely destined to be awesome. " 148apps said "iBlast Moki is the best physics game for the iPhone, and at $1.99, it would be criminal to pass up one of the best games of the year. " SlideToPlay said "If you enjoy getting stumped and stumping others, this personality-filled puzzle game should be your next download. " IGN wrote "Moki's 70 environmental puzzles will challenge you for days and the hundreds and thousands of user-generated levels will keep you busy for months. As far as I'm concerned, this is a must-own title and a showpiece for Apple's portable. " Appgamer said "iBlast Moki combines aspects of Rolando, Billiards, Little Big Planet and Crazy Machines to form its own unique, engaging and fun experience and we would urge you not to miss out on it." Pocket Gamer UK said "Physics-based action puzzler iBlast Moki provides plenty of explosive fun as well as providing some surprisingly thoughtful challenges. "

=== iBlast Moki 2 ===
The original version of the game has a rating of 90% based on 11 critic reviews, while the HD version has a rating of 93% based on 5 critic reviews.

TouchArcade wrote "If you have even a passing interest in puzzle or physics games, you need iBlast Moki 2 in your life." SlideToPlay said it is "Everything a sequel should be. " AppSpy said "If you loved the original iBlast Moki, this is a no-brainer, but if you missed it and you enjoy physics based puzzles it's hard to pass up on this cute and easy to master title. " Gamezebo wrote "Even though the market is full of physics puzzlers at the moment, iBlast Moki 2 manages to stand head-and-shoulders above its competition. It's incredibly clever and fun, and its stunning production values only add to the overall experience. " SpazioGames said "A funny and compelling puzzle game, if you love the genre this is for you. " IGN wrote "This sequel doesn't feel quite as special as the original – the App Store is a much more mature games portal now – but iBlast Moki 2 still stands as an excellent puzzler."

AppSmile said "iBlast Moki was one of our favorite early iDevice releases, mixing sweetly-rough graphics with simple controls and timing-based, bomb-blasting fun. The sequel takes all of these elements, adds in a bunch of new goodness, spit-polishes it to a high sheen, and delivers it in an impressive package. " TouchArcade said "If you have even a passing interest in puzzle or physics games, you need iBlast Moki 2 in your life. " Pocket Gamer France wrote "Not surprisingly, iBlast Moki buries the competition. Beautiful, simple and addictive, you can barely fault it. Whether you're a fan of puzzle games or not, iBlast Moki 2 is definitely a game that will have you hooked for a few hours. " Pocket Gamer UK said "Everything a sequel should be, iBlast Moki 2 HD might be the best £1.99 you'll ever spend. "
