= Harms Way =

2010 video game

- Developer: Bongfish GmbH
- Publisher: Microsoft Game Studios
- Composer: Die Mognstuambuam
- Platform: Xbox 360 (XBLA)
- Release: December 8, 2010
- Genre: Racing
- Modes: Single-player, multiplayer

Harms Way is a racing advergame developed by Austrian independent software developer Bongfish GmbH for the Xbox 360's Xbox Live Arcade service. It was released on December 8, 2010, for free as one of the finalists of the Doritos-sponsored "Unlock Xbox" competition for 2010, alongside Doritos Crash Course. Originating from a hybrid racing/shooting game concept by Ogden, Utah gamer Justin Carpenter, this game has a wasteland-like setting and tone, similar to Mad Max. On December 29, 2010, it was announced that Harms Way lost to Doritos Crash Course in the second "Unlock Xbox" competition. However, due to positive feedback on both games, Frito-Lay decided to give both Carpenter and competition winner Jill Robertson the same US$50,000 consultation prize each. The soundtrack for the game was provided by Austrian thrash metal band Die Mognstuambuam.

On May 6, 2017, the game was added to the backwards compatibility program, making it playable on Xbox One.

== Gameplay ==
In Harms Way, players take on the role of either driver or shooter.

=== Driver ===
Drivers ride across one of three courses in a three-lap race with power-ups and shortcuts to help lead them to their victory. To win, a driver must finish in first place out of 4 ranks. Drivers can drift to earn nitro boosts and do barrel rolls for shields, which prevent drivers from receiving damage and may ricochet gunfire back to snipers. The time it takes for drivers to finish a race can represent their ranks in the leaderboards.

There are four vehicles, each with three attributes: speed (which affects top speed and acceleration), armor (which affects the amount of damage the vehicle can take), and handling (which affects steering and drifting).

- Buggy - Has good speed and handling, but the worst armor.
- Pickup - Has average speed and armor, but the best handling. It is recommended for beginners.
- Truck - Also has average speed as well as handling, but the best armor.
- Bus - Has the best speed and good armor, but the worst handling.

=== Shooter ===
Shooters can snipe other vehicles and damage them. The shooters' goal is to damage and destroy the vehicle as badly as possible. A fatal hit to the windshield of a vehicle will instantly destroy it, giving the shooter 5000 points. Shooters can also hit wheels to stop or slow down a vehicle for 250 points. Shooters can also shoot at power-ups on the track to either prevent drivers from using them or to upgrade their own turrets with new weapons. The number of points snipers earn can represent their ranks in the leaderboards.

There are four weapons for each shooter, each available after certain number of upgrades:

- Sniper rifle - A powerful single shot from a sniper rifle can cause windshield kills and flat tires. Also has good zooming capabilities and a laser pointer that's also visible to drivers, though it's slow to reload. This is the weapon that shooters start out with.
- Burst Shot - A machine gun which rapidly fires relatively weak rounds. Has some zooming capabilities and is prone to overheating. This is the first weapon that shooters receive from upgrading.
- Air Strike - Launches a group of land mines from the air and onto the track, detonating automatically if untouched for five seconds. This weapon is earned after two upgrades.
- Missile launcher - A rocket launcher that can lock onto moving targets and cause heavy damage, which is strong enough to knock down objects that can fall onto drivers and block the road. It fires in straight lines by default. This is the last weapon that shooters can earn, requiring three upgrades.

=== Power-ups ===
There are five power-ups in the game that affects both drivers and shooters:

- Nitro - Give vehicles a small amount of nitrous that allows drivers to gain speed when they want to use it.
- Shield - Give vehicles temporary invulnerability and may cause gunfire from shooters to ricochet back to them.
- Smoke - Drops a smoke bomb on the nearest turret, making it harder for that shooter to see.
- Turret Upgrade - Can be earned from either a shooter or a driver, this power-up upgrades all sniper turrets for the team who gets it. It is not available in single-player driving mode.
- Turret Downgrade - Like the Turret Upgrade, but causes all teams' turrets to be downgraded except for the team that collects it. It is only available in multiplayer.

== Reception ==
Reception

Aggregate score
Aggregator	Score
Metacritic	65/100

Review scores
Publication	Score
Jeuxvideo.com	15/20
VentureBeat	4/10
VideoGamer.com	6/10

The game received "mixed" reviews according to the review aggregation website Metacritic.

K. Alexander Smith of Paste called it "surprisingly innovative" as well as a "rare example of a corporation trying to do good while doing well" with regards to the circumstances behind its creation.

Since its release, the game sold 347,375 units worldwide by January 2011. Sales of the game moved up to 800,752 units by the end of 2011.

== See also ==
- Dash of Destruction
- Doritos Crash Course
