= Gerbil Physics =

2009 video game

- Title screen
- Developer: Pencel Games
- Publisher: Microsoft Studios
- Designer: Kevin Small
- Artist: Jon Goosens
- Composer: Kevin MacLeod
- Engine: Farseer Physics Engine; Mercury Particle Engine
- Platforms: Android, Windows Phone
- Release: December 7, 2009 (Demo); March 14, 2012 (Full Release)
- Genre: Puzzle
- Mode: Single-player

Gerbil Physics is a mobile video game created as a demo as an Xbox Indie Game in 2009 by British studio Pencel Games and released fully in app stores officially on March 14, 2012.

== Plot ==
The evil Toad King has a hatred for Gerbils and has them imprisoned in blocks that are stacked into monuments. The player is tasked with demolishing those monuments to liberate the Gerbils and restore their land.

== Gameplay ==
The object of the game is to knock down every block with gerbils imprisoned in them beneath the yellow line in 84 levels. The player makes use of bombs, blasts or nukes to knock the blocks away, ideally supporting blocks to collapse the monument. Gerbils in red blocks must never be touched. Points are accumulated by liberating as many gerbils as possible in the shortest time.

== Development ==
The game was coded in the C# language. The audio was composed using the Audacity tool. The levels were designed using the Gleed2D application. Kevin Small hired someone from Brazil to voice the gerbils. The game had to be rewritten in order to cater for the mobile platforms.

A sequel titled Gerbil Physics 2 was released for Xbox Live Indie Games store on May 17, 2010.

== Reception ==
Kotaku reviewed the game as both adorable and enthralling. PC Magazine rated it as one of 30 "Best Windows Phone Games".
