= Happy Wars =

2012 tactical role-playing video game

- Happy Wars cover
- Developer: Toylogic
- Publisher: Toylogic
- Directors: Yoichi Take; Yusuke Ochiai
- Designers: Daichi Kurumiya (Lead); Yui Terao; Takumi Kudo; Masafumi Nukita
- Artists: Go Takahashi (Art Director); Chisato End (3D Lead); Satoko Tsushima (2D Lead)
- Platforms: Xbox 360; Microsoft Windows; Xbox One
- Release: Xbox Live Arcade; NA: 7 October 2012; AU: 10 October 2012 EU: 12 October 2012; Microsoft Windows; May 28, 2014; Xbox One; April 24, 2015
- Genres: Action, tactical role-playing
- Modes: Single-player, multiplayer

Happy Wars is a free-to-play tactical role-playing video game developed and published by Toylogic. It was originally released for the Xbox 360 on October 12, 2012 on the Xbox Live Arcade as its first free-to-play title, and additionally for Microsoft Windows on May 28, 2014, but availability on the online marketplaces of these platforms and service to these platforms has since been discontinued as of December 17, 2018. The Xbox One version was released on April 24, 2015.

== Gameplay ==
Happy Wars is a multiplayer online game, defined as a role-playing strategy game, although it also has a single player skirmish mode and a short story-driven single player campaign mode. In the main multiplayer mode, players are separated into two teams: the Light Kingdom and the Dark Kingdom. Each team consists of 4-15 players. There are 12 maps to play on, each map having a different number of towers and match time limit. Towers are used as respawn points for when a player is killed, and they can choose to respawn at any tower belonging to their team. A castle belonging to either team is located on both ends of the map, with the team's big tower in the center. The inside of the castle is blocked by a castle gate at the front and barriers on top of the front and side walls, which can be destroyed by attacks. The main goal of each match is to build up towers for the player's team and destroy the opposing team's towers while also defending their own. A team wins when the opposing team's big tower is destroyed, or when the opposing team has less towers than their own when the time is up. If both teams have the same amount of towers after the time limit, the match will go on endlessly until a tower is built or destroyed. After every match, the player receives points that contribute to their rank. Rank is the main leveling system, and goes up to Rank 60. Players also receive medals after every match based on their contributions. Some can be earned once for reaching a milestone, while others can be gained infinitely by completing a certain action in a match.

As of September 3, 2014, an Xbox Live Gold account was required to play the game online; due to recent updates, the game now accepts regular Xbox Live members as well.

The players choose from one of three classes: the Warrior, the Mage, and the Cleric. There are also three subclasses, being the Warrior-type Berserker, the Mage-type Zephyr, and the Cleric-type Engineer. Each class has a base attack and specialized playing style. During a match, player level is increased as the player defeats enemies, builds and destroys towers, or completes other various actions, which gains them experience points, up to level 5. As the player level increases, their maximum HP and AP increases and they can use more skills. Skills are unique between classes, and can be used by spending AP in order to perform special attacks or gain helpful status conditions. Each class also has unique "Team Skills", where players can gather teammates together to allow the casting player to use more powerful skills. The more players that aid in the use of the team skill, the more powerful the ability becomes. Player level resets after every match.

The game also has five different item types that can be acquired either through playing the game or through microtransactions that allow in-game items to be purchased with Microsoft Points. Weapons determine the attack stat of the player. Shields lower the damage taken from attacks, given that it is facing the attack. Armor and helmets determine the defense stat of the player. Accessories provide additional buffs to the player. Items can have up to four buff slots to assign buffs to. Items will usually have buffs when acquired, which can either be erased from the item, or put into buff storage at the cost of destroying the item. Some items come with fixed buffs that cannot be removed or stored. Additionally, some buffs actually provide negative effects to the item; however, these are never fixed and can be removed. Each item also has a specific weight, and each class has a unique weight limit that affects how many items can be wielded. The weight limit of all classes is increased as Rank increases, allowing higher ranked players to utilize better equipment. Weapons, armor, and helmets are unique between classes. Warriors, Clerics, and Engineers can wield all five item types. Berserkers can wield an extra weapon, but cannot wield a shield. Mages and Zephyrs cannot wield a shield, but their weapons have an additional magic attack stat. Items have the chance to be Premium or Super Premium, which have much higher stats and better buffs than regular items but also have higher weight. Items start at Level 1 when acquired and gain experience after every match or by sacrificing items to manually level them up. Fabled Ores can be sacrificed for major experience gain, and Big or Super Hammers can be used to increase the experience added when sacrificing items. The highest level for an item by normal means is Level 10, but it can go beyond that by sacrificing an identical item or any type of Statue item. Also, Super Premium weapons that are at or above Level 10 are able to evolve. These have higher stats and exclusive super variants of any fixed buffs, but have their weight increased by two. There are items in Happy Wars that can only be purchased with Microsoft Points. They are usually powerful items that can allow players to get a head start in the game.

Happy Stars and Happy Tickets are the in-game currencies. Happy Tickets are the premium currency and are gained from mission mode or as seasonal rewards. They are primarily used when opening Happy Cards. Each Happy Cards pack contains two common items and one Premium or Super Premium item. Happy Cards can also be opened using a Happy Cards Free Pass. Stickers can be used when opening Happy Cards to guarantee items for a specific class. Happy Stars are the basic currency and are gained after every match. They are used when leveling up items manually or in Happy Cards Lite, a version of Happy Cards where each pack contains a single random item.

=== Game modes ===
==== Multiplayer ====
The main multiplayer modes are Quick Match and Co-op Mode. In Quick Match, two teams of players fight against each other. If the lobby is not full, a few NPCs are added to each team. Teams with higher ranked players have easier NPCs to defeat, and teams with lower ranked players have harder NPCs to defeat. After a match, the player will receive an item box with a random piece of equipment. Item boxes range from Level 1-5 depending on their contribution to the match, with higher level item boxes being more likely to provide Premium or Super Premium Items.

Player Match is a friend-only version of Quick Match. Item boxes cannot be won in this game mode.

In Co-op Mode, a team of players fights against a themed NPC team, the number of NPCs being equal to the number of players. Generally, NPC teams are dedicated to one or two specific classes. Periodically, a special enemy type will spawn in, having special abilities and giving a large sum of points when defeated. Multiple special enemies can be on the map at the same time, which can make defeating them difficult at times. In addition, each NPC team has a unique head honcho as one of the special enemy types. After a match, the player will receive an item box and Co-op Points depending on their contribution to the match. Co-op Points are used to obtain rewards for the season, including Happy Stars, Happy Tickets, Happy Cards Free Passes, Stickers, Big Hammers, Super Hammers, Fabled Ores, all Statue variants, and exclusive items. Co-op Points and the season's rewards reset after every season.

Hell's Challenge is a harder version of Co-op Mode only available to players above rank 40. The enemy NPC teams are much harder to beat, but more Co-op Points are gained after each match.

==== Single player ====
Skirmish Mode is an offline mode in which the player fights alongside and against a full team of NPCs. The rules of Skirmish Mode are the same as Quick Match, and the difficulty level can be changed between Normal and Hard. Any map can be chosen by the player. Skirmish Mode can be used to increase Rank only up to Rank 20.

Story Mode is a short campaign mode consisting of six chapters with a total of thirteen missions. Chapters are unlocked as the player's Rank increases. The main story involves the Light Kingdom and Dark Kingdom, who are constantly engaging in petty wars with each other. This time, the Dark King has stolen the Princess of the Light Kingdom to marry her, so the Light King sends his knights to bring her back. Three of the chapters revolve around defeating the Dark Kingdom's forces and confronting the Dark King. The other three chapters have the player fighting new enemies that threaten the land. While some missions have the regular objective of destroying the enemy's big tower, most involve defeating specific enemies. Completing them for the first time provides the player with an item, some of which cannot be gained anywhere else. Every replay afterwards rewards the player with Happy Stars. Every mission has Hard and Very Hard variants that provide more Happy Stars upon completion.

== Reception ==
Reception

Aggregate score
Aggregator	Score
Metacritic	X360: 61/100

Review scores
Publication	Score
GameSpot	5/10
IGN	4/10
Jeuxvideo.com	15/20
Official Xbox Magazine (UK)	6/10
VentureBeat	70/100
The Escapist	3/5

The Xbox 360 version of Happy Wars received "mixed" reviews according to the review aggregation website Metacritic. IGN cited lack of players as a concern with the Xbox 360 version and that "Happy Wars went too far in the direction of accessibility with its few classes, lack of distinctive weaponry, and simple game modes." Official Xbox Magazine UK compared said console version to Awesomenauts, but noted that players who pay for additional content appear to have an advantage over other players.

Jason Venter of GameSpot said that the same console version was "difficult to recommend because of the game's matchmaking and connection issues." A content update was released in November that attempted to fix the connection issues and other small game fixes.
