= Crimson Alliance =

2011 video game

- Cover art depicting the game's character classes (from left to right): Assassin, Mercenary and Wizard
- Developer: Certain Affinity
- Publisher: Microsoft Studios
- Producer: Tom Potter
- Designer: Mark Tucker
- Platform: Xbox 360
- Release: September 7, 2011
- Genre: Action role-playing
- Modes: Single-player, multiplayer

Crimson Alliance is a co-op action role-playing game developed by Certain Affinity and published by Microsoft Studios. The game was first announced at RTX 2011 and was available for demo at E3, Comic-Con and PAX Prime, with the press release being announced on May 31, 2011.

Crimson Alliance was released on September 7, 2011 on Xbox Live Arcade for free as a freemium. Player can choose to pay between 800 Microsoft Points for one character class or 1200 Microsoft Points for all three character classes. The game was also offered as a free bonus code download for those who purchased all five of the fourth annual Xbox Live Summer of Arcade titles before August 23, 2011.

== Plot ==
Once a thriving empire, Byzan has faced dark times with survivors living a meager existence while a cruel goddess, the Soul Siren, rules with an iron fist and is not afraid to have her minions do her dirty work. Direwolf, Moonshade and Gnox – the wizard, assassin and mercenary – dive into the primitive world to stop the Soul Siren from unleashing her ultimate weapon. But these three have their own sordid pasts to deal with as well.

== Gameplay ==
Crimson Alliance is an action RPG that uses gold to upgrade characters weapons and armor. Each character has a special fighting style which players can equip to match their play style. There are three equipment slots for each character. Direwolf, the wizard, uses long range attacks to defeat his enemies while Gnox the mercenary has a melee fighting style. Moonshade, the assassin, is a hybrid of the two, using both melee and long range shots to bring down her attackers. Each character is equipped with a basic attack and a heavy attack and can also stun their enemies and dash throughout the levels.

In each level there are secret areas to find as well as class specific areas where characters can open chests that contain items to upgrade their weaponry and armor. Merchants are available to improve items. Also throughout the game are challenge maps where players will have to defeat hordes of enemies.

The leaderboard system takes advantage of the hack and slash style of play. As the player kills more enemies without being hit, the player's score multiplier increases, resulting in higher overall scores. Higher difficulty settings also increases the points earned.

== Reception ==
Reception

Aggregate score
Aggregator	Score
Metacritic	72/100

Review scores
Publication	Score
Destructoid	7.5/10
Game Informer	8.75/10
GamePro	4/5
GameRevolution	B−
GameSpot	5.5/10
GameTrailers	6.7/10
GameZone	8/10
Joystiq	4/5
Official Xbox Magazine (US)	8/10
RPGamer	2.5/5
The Digital Fix	7/10
Metro	6/10

At E3, Crimson Alliance was a nominee of Game Informer's and G4TV's "Best Of" awards as well as 1UP.com's "Top 10 Sleepers of E3 2011." On release, the game received "average" reviews according to the review aggregation website Metacritic.

The Observer gave it an average review and stated, "Once past the hackneyed presentation of this co-op dungeon crawler there is a real meaty, moreish pleasure to be had. The key is solid combat – each of the three characters has basic, heavy and stun attacks, with special moves and collectible extras such as deployable turrets, which add to a contained but tactical system." The Digital Fix gave it seven out of ten, stating, "Leave your traditional RPG expectations at the door, jump in with some friends and for 800 points you will find a great little arcade dungeon crawler." Metro gave it six out of ten, calling it "Derivative, shallow and ruthlessly unambitious, but as Diablo clones go this is still one of the best and most addictive on consoles."

On September 27, 2011 Certain Affinity announced the release of the Vengeance Pack for Crimson Alliance, which became available on October 12, 2011. The pack was reported to contain 4 levels, new monsters, new treasures, a new challenge type, and 3 new achievements. Sales at year's-end 2011 are approximated at 116,000 units.
