= Scrap Metal (video game) =

2010 video game

- Developer: Slick Entertainment
- Publisher: Microsoft
- Platform: Xbox 360 (XBLA)
- Release: WW: March 10, 2010
- Genre: Vehicular combat racing
- Modes: Single-player, Multiplayer

Scrap Metal is a vehicular combat racing game by Slick Entertainment released on March 10, 2010 on Xbox Live Marketplace.

== Gameplay ==
Players race around tracks from an overhead perspective. Scrap Metal includes 60 single-player racing missions which include shortcuts, jumps, obstacles and temporary upgrades such as nitro boosts. Players can customize their vehicles choosing from 20 unique vehicle options, including muscle cars, bulldozers, airboats, and monster trucks. The vehicles can be customized and fitted with such weaponry as flamethrowers, chainsaws and rocket launchers. Scrap Metal also includes several multiplayer modes, including king of the hill, demolition derby and a "Survivor" game in which players complete laps while being chased by police cars, helicopters and tanks. Both the single-player and multiplayer games are capable of supporting up to four players. Scores are tracked and compared in Xbox Live leaderboards. The game's online servers were shut down months after release due to low player count. Scrap Metal includes a 3D anaglyph display mode.

== Reception ==
A playable version of Scrap Metal was spotlighted at the 2010 Consumer Electronics Show in Las Vegas. Early reports of the game have been generally positive. Game Informer writer Matt Miller wrote, "Scrap Metal is a top-down racing game in the style of R.C. Pro-Am with serious action game overtones." Neoseeker's Lydia Sung said "Imagine if you will, a shinier R.C. Pro-Am with chainsaws and more firepower." Matt Casamassina of IGN likewise described the game as "RC Pro-Am meets Twisted Metal." Casamassina said the graphics were rendered with great attention to detail, and that the controls are easy to pick up but difficult to master because each vehicle responds differently.

GameZone's Dakota Grabowski gave the game a 7.5 out of 10, saying "The cars found in Scrap Metal range from strange to exotic including the following: extreme hot rods, off-road buggies, bulldozers, drag racers, semi-trucks, monster trucks, cruisers, muscle cars, hover cars, import tuners, and even the van that was down by the river. Each car is broken down into classes and rated on speed, grip, and armor. Players are able to upgrade each car by earning currency, which can also be used to buy nitrous oxide for a quick speed boost on the track. If that isn't enough to attract racing fans, then perhaps the ability to select from six paint colors, an assortment of decals (flames, racing stripes, etc.), and adding accessories will entice them. The accessories range from turning their semi-truck into a garbage truck or even their bulldozer into an excavator. There's not much else out on the Xbox Live Arcade like Scrap Metal, so it's definitely an [sic] unique experience."
