= Arkadium =

American gaming company

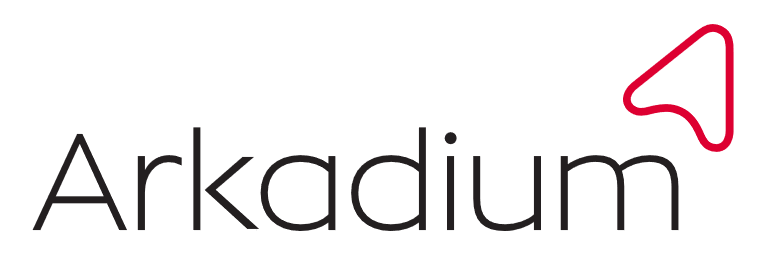
- Industry: Media, video games
- Founded: New York, New York; United States in 2001
- Founders: Jessica Rovello (Executive Chair); Kenny Rosenblatt (CEO)
- Headquarters: New York, New York, United States
- Products: Online games
- Number of employees: <100

Arkadium is a developer of casual browser-based games, which are hosted on its own website, Arkadium.com, as well as across a network of digital publishers including USA Today and The Washington Post and Microsoft's Zone.com. The company is headquartered in New York City, with an additional office in Lisbon, Portugal.

== History ==
Kenny Rosenblatt and Jessica Rovello founded Arkadium in 2001, inspired by a game of Ms. Pac-Man. Arkadium developed the Microsoft Solitaire Collection in 2011 as well as the modern iteration of Minesweeper.

In 2014, after the Russian annexation of Crimea, the US put sanctions on companies operating there. Arkadium had a 100-person team in Crimea, which was reduced to 50 and relocated from that region.

In January 2017, the company announced it signed 300 new publishers in 2016 and saw record growth, and in 2019 announced a partnership with Sportradar to make it easy to bet on sports trivia questions to make web-based content more interactive and engaging for fans.

In September 2018, Arkadium used its profits to buy out the investors, allowing the company to remain independent and grow on its own terms. CEO Jessica Rovello said she had no regrets about stepping off the venture-funded path. Arkadium games were played 830 million times in 2018.

In 2024, Arkadium introduced Arkadium for Developers, opening its distribution network to developers worldwide with a 75% revenue-sharing model. Later that year, the company launched its third-party publishing initiative, APF1, a $1 million fund designed to support external game developers through publishing opportunities.

== Corporate affairs ==
=== Leadership ===
Arkadium is managed by CEO and Co-Founder Kenny Rosenblatt.

=== Customer and revenue ===
The company reaches over 25 million users each month across Arkadium.com and its network of gaming sites. Its hit games include the Word Wipe, Mahjong Dimensions, Outspell, and Hurdle and its collection of Card and Crossword Titles. Arkadium also developed the Microsoft Solitaire Collection which comes loaded on Windows 10, Windows 8, and mobile devices.

In 2020, the company announced a partnership with Fremantle to bring web-based versions of classic television game shows, including Family Feud, The Price is Right, Card Sharks, and Press Your Luck to Arkadium.com.

== Awards ==
Arkadium was named one of 14 New York Tech Companies to watch in 2016 by Forbes, and 'Best Workplace' by Inc. Magazine in its 2016 and 2017 issues. The company was named by Digiday as Employer of the Year, Tech platform category, in 2017, Crain's 100 Best Places to Work in New York City in 2017, and number 27 in AdAge's Best Places to Work in 2017. In 2019, Arkadium was named 'Best Workplace by Inc. Magazine, and the company's InHabit product, in conjunction with Spark Foundry and NBA, was named a Digiday Publishing Awards winner in the 'Best Custom Advertising' category for a 2018-19 NBA Tip Off campaign. In 2020, the company was certified as a Great Place to Work, as well as won an award for Best Place to Work by the Business Intelligence Group. In December 2019, Forbes featured Arkadium's HR and hiring practices.

Arkadium was again certified as a Great Place to Work for 2022–2023. It was included in Crain's Best Places to Work in New York City in 2022, and in Happiness Works Portugal's Top 20 Happiest Companies rankings in 2023, 2024, and 2025. In 2025, Fast Company named Arkadium to its Best Workplaces for Innovators: Midsized Companies list.

== Developed video games ==
Game	Platform
Taptiles	Windows 8.x, Windows 10, Android, iOS
Microsoft Solitaire Collection	Windows 8.x, Windows Phone 8.x, Windows 10, Windows 10 Mobile, Android, iOS
Microsoft Minesweeper	Windows 8.x, Windows 10
