= Motocross Madness (2013 video game) =

2013 video game

- Developer: Bongfish
- Publisher: Microsoft Studios
- Platform: Xbox 360
- Release: April 10, 2013
- Genres: Vehicle simulation Racing
- Modes: Single-player, multiplayer

Motocross Madness is a motocross racing video game that was developed by Austrian studio Bongfish and published by Microsoft Studios. It was released on April 10, 2013 on Xbox Live Arcade. It is a sequel to two Microsoft Windows games, 1998's Motocross Madness and 2000's Motocross Madness 2, which were developed by Rainbow Studios, who have since moved on to making the MX vs. ATV series.

The game received "mixed or average" reviews according to review aggregator Metacritic, and holds a score of 73 out of 100. It was delisted from Xbox Live in August 2016. Reviewers found the gameplay engaging, but reception to the inclusion of Xbox 360 avatars was mixed. Critics were mostly unified in saying that the game was a good value for its 800 Microsoft Point cost.

== Gameplay ==
Motocross Madness is a spiritual successor to its namesake. It features open-world exploration and circuit racing on dirtbikes.

Motocross Madness is a motocross racing video game. It features three open worlds, which are fictional representations of Egypt, Australia and Iceland. Each location can be freely ridden, or players can complete races on circuits within each environment. Each motorcycle is equipped with a boost system which recharges over time. Multiplayer is available locally for two players via split-screen, or can be played online. Also featured is a rivals mode, where players can compete for best race times against other players. The game makes use of the Xbox 360 avatars as the player characters.

Players can use button combinations to perform tricks while in the air. Xbox 360 avatar rewards can be earned through gameplay, and via the Avatar Famestars program, which awards players Famestar Points for completing in-game tasks across various titles, including Motocross Madness. Motorcycles can be upgraded with various parts via the in-game shop. Coins for upgrades can be earned in races or by finding them while exploring the open worlds. Six motorcycles are available for purchase and upgrades.

== Development and release ==
The game was first teased in May 2012 via Microsoft's PlayXBLA blog. Two screenshots were shown which featured the environment and Xbox 360 avatars on motorcycles. In June 2012 at the Electronics Entertainment Expo (E3), Microsoft announced that a new Motocross Madness game entitled Avatar Motocross Madness would be released for Xbox Live Arcade in the future. The title was changed to just Motocross Madness in 2013, to be released on April 10. It was published by Microsoft Game Studios and developed by Austrian studio Bongfish who also developed another avatar-based game for the Xbox 360, Red Bull Crashed Ice Kinect.

Motocross Madness was available free of charge for Xbox Live Gold members as part of the Games with Gold program between August 1 through 15, 2014. In December 2015, the game was made backwards compatible with Xbox One. It was delisted from Xbox Live in August 2016 for undisclosed reasons.

== Reception ==
Reception

Aggregate score
Aggregator	Score
Metacritic	73/100

Review scores
Publication	Score
Eurogamer	7/10
GameSpot	7.5/10
IGN	8.5/10
Official Xbox Magazine (US)	8/10

Motocross Madness received "mixed or average" reviews according to review aggregator Metacritic, and holds a score of 73 out of 100. Scores ranged from a 50% approval from D+Pad Magazine to a 90% approval from Console Monster. Based on Xbox Live Arcade leaderboards, the game had moved 21,848 units during the month of its release.

Critics gave generally positive commentary on Motocross Madness's gameplay. Leif Johnson of GameSpot enjoyed the game's trick system, and that it would build up a boost meter, which he also found fun to use. Andy Mahood felt that the controls were "loose and easy, and the open-sandbox format, with its multiple paths and shortcuts, delivers a unique experience every time out." Eurogamer Italia's Recensione di Francesco Serino felt that the gameplay was fast and agile. Serino did not like the music selections. Official Xbox Magazine's Cameron Lewis said players will "ace every event in a handful of hours without much difficulty."

Reception on the use of Xbox 360 avatars was generally mixed. Alice Bell of Official Xbox Magazine UK felt that the presence of "credible" motorcycle models and avatars was "jarring". GameSpot's Leif Johnson agreed. He called the combination an "awkward juggle of realism and cartoony aesthetics." In contrast Andy Mahood of IGN felt that his avatar was "it was a pleasant surprise to see" in the game. Recensione di Francesco Serino from Eurogamer Italia also appreciated seeing his own avatar in the game, and noted that players could choose to be dressed as Halo protagonist Master Chief if they chose to.

Most reviewers felt that the game was a good value for its price of 800 Microsoft Points. Recensione di Francesco Serino from Eurogamer Italia stated that the game would be a good value to many, if not all players. IGN's Andy Mahood describes its price-to-value as a "cheap and engaging two-wheeled experience." Alice Bell agreed, and noted that the game was full of content for its price. She said "So much content has been wrung out of this game that there's even a reward for the number of miles you bail out of jumps." Official Xbox Magazine's Cameron Lewis felt that the price "buys at least a few afternoons of enjoyable airborne antics."
