= Doritos Crash Course =

2010 video game

- Developers: Wanako Games; Behaviour Interactive
- Publisher: Microsoft Game Studios
- Platform: Xbox 360 (XBLA)
- Release: December 8, 2010
- Genre: Platform
- Modes: Single-player, multiplayer

Doritos Crash Course (formerly titled as Avatar Crash Course) is a 3D sidescrolling platforming advergame developed by Wanako Games for the Xbox 360. It was released for free as one of the finalists of the "Unlock Xbox" competition sponsored by Doritos, alongside Harms Way. The concept for the game was designed by Jill Robertson from Raleigh, North Carolina, inspired by Japanese game shows such as Sasuke. On December 29, 2010, the game was announced the winner of the second "Unlock Xbox" competition.

On December 17, 2015, the game was added to the backwards compatibility program, making it playable on Xbox One and later Xbox Series X/S consoles.

== Gameplay ==
In Doritos Crash Course, the players have to get their Xbox 360 avatars through increasingly difficult obstacle courses before the time runs out. Each course has a various number of checkpoints scattered throughout. If the avatar falls off the course, the game will begin from the last passed checkpoint. The game is composed of three locations (United States, Europe, and Japan), each having five levels. Some of the obstacles include collapsing floors, swinging ropes, chains, and water balloons.

== Reception ==
Reception

Aggregate score
Aggregator	Score
Metacritic	74/100

Review scores
Publication	Score
HobbyConsolas	72%
Jeuxvideo.com	16/20
Official Xbox Magazine (UK)	8/10
VentureBeat	7/10
VideoGamer.com	8/10

The game received "mixed or average reviews" according to the review aggregation website Metacritic.

Since its release, the game sold 1,449,359 units worldwide by January 2011. Sales of the game moved up to 4,222,820 units by the end of 2011.

== Downloadable content ==
On January 2, 2013, the "City Lights" DLC was made available for $1.99 (USD). The pack contains fifteen levels spanning Las Vegas and London, along with the new versions of the levels set in Japan from the original game.

== Doritos Crash Course Go! ==
Doritos Crash Course Go! (sometimes known as Doritos Crash Course GO) is a Windows 8 port of Doritos Crash Course released on April 11, 2013. It featured 25 levels (15 main game levels from the Xbox 360 and 10 levels from the "City Lights" DLC). The easier versions of Japan levels featured in "City Lights" DLC replaced the original harder ones in this version. The game was delisted from the Microsoft Store on May 21, 2014, leaving no official way to get this version.

== Sequel ==
On May 8, 2013, the sequel named Doritos Crash Course 2 was released for free on Xbox Live Arcade. Similar to the first game, avatars controlled by the players will participate in obstacle courses. Leaderboards allow competitions with friends online, where up to four players can in local multiplayer. The game brings out 4 new worlds (Amazon, Antarctic, Egypt, and Pirate Island) with five courses each. Unlike in Doritos Crash Course, players must collect stars, which are used to unlock levels, buy power-ups and effects that change avatars' appearance in-game.

On April 17, 2014, Microsoft Studios announced that on October 15, 2014, the servers for this game would be shut down, rendering the game unplayable. A week later, on April 24, 2014, the game was delisted from the Xbox Games Store.

== See also ==
- Dash of Destruction
- Harms Way
