= Microsoft Minesweeper =

Video game series published by Microsoft

- Microsoft Minesweeper for Windows 10 from Microsoft Store
- Developers: Curt Johnson (1992); Oberon Media (2006); Arkadium & Microsoft Casual Games (2012)
- Publishers: Microsoft (1992–2012); Microsoft Studios (2012–present)
- Platforms: Included with: Entertainment Pack 1; Windows 3.1; Windows 9x family; Windows NT 3.1 through Windows 7, excluding Windows Server; Available for: Windows 8 and later; Windows Phone 7 and later; HoloLens; Surface Hub and Surface Hub 2S
- Genre: Puzzle
- Mode: Single-player

Microsoft Minesweeper (formerly just Minesweeper, and also known as Flower Field) is a minesweeper-type video game created by Curt Johnson, originally for IBM's OS/2, that was ported to Microsoft Windows by Robert Donner, both Microsoft employees at the time. First released as part of the Microsoft Entertainment Pack 1 in 1990, it was first included in the standard install of Windows 3.1 in 1992, replacing Reversi from Windows 3.0. Microsoft Minesweeper was included without major changes in all subsequent Windows releases until Windows Vista, at which time an updated version by Oberon Media replaced it. In Windows 8 and later the game is not included with a fresh Windows install, but Microsoft Studios has published an updated version of it, developed by Arkadium, on Microsoft Store.

== Gameplay ==
The goal of Minesweeper is to uncover all the squares on a grid that do not contain mines without being "blown up" by clicking on a square with a mine underneath. The location of most mines is discovered through a logical process, but some require guessing, usually with a 50-50 chance of being correct. Clicking on the game board will reveal what is hidden underneath the chosen square or squares (a large number of blank squares [bordering 0 mines] may be revealed in one go if they are adjacent to each other). Some squares are blank while others contain numbers (from 1 to 8), with each number being the number of mines adjacent to the uncovered square.

To help the player avoid hitting a mine, the location of a suspected mine can be marked by flagging it with the right mouse button; however, if a player is unsure if a square is safe or not, they can tag it with a question mark (?). The game is won once all blank or numbered squares have been uncovered by the player without hitting a mine; any remaining mines not identified by flags are automatically flagged by the computer. However, in the event that a game is lost and the player had mistakenly flagged a safe square, that square will either appear with a red X, or else a red X covering the mine (both denoting the square as safe). The game board comes in three set sizes with a predetermined number of mines: "beginner", "intermediate", and "expert", although a "custom" option is available as well.

== History ==
The Windows 98 version of Microsoft Minesweeper

Minesweeper was first included with IBM's OS/2. It was later ported to Windows and released as a part of the Microsoft Entertainment Pack 1 in 1990. It was then included with Windows 3.1 and subsequent versions of Windows.

In 1999, a campaign titled the International Campaign to Ban Winmine was started. The campaign claimed that Minesweeper was insensitive to minefield victims and suggested the mines be changed to flowers. This change was implemented into certain localized versions of Windows 2000, Windows ME, and Windows XP, renaming the game to Flower Field and changing the mines to flowers.

=== Minesweeper Flags ===
In 2003, Microsoft created a variation called Minesweeper Flags in MSN Messenger, which is played against an opponent with the objective to find the mines rather than the surrounding squares.

A version of Minesweeper Flags for Xbox 360 was developed by TikGames LLC and published by Microsoft Studios on the Xbox Live Arcade in 2010.

=== Windows Vista and Windows 7 ===
The "Flower Field" version of Minesweeper, developed by Oberon Media, shows a garden blooming when the game is lost. It is the default in specific distributions of Windows.

The game's color scheme changed with the release of Vista (from gray to either blue or green). The icons were updated to match the Aero look. It also came with a "flower" motif (called "Flower Garden") as an alternative to the landmines (a game style called "Minesweeper"). The visual change also allowed for the Board to be "Silver and Blue" or "Green". This iteration of Minesweeper was created by Oberon Media. The controversy over the land mine theme of the game was settled by defaulting the appearance based on region so that "sensitive" areas used the flower theme, but some still wanted the game removed from Windows altogether. The regionalization effort also included changing the game's name in some cases to match the theme.

=== Windows 8 and later ===
Microsoft removed Minesweeper from Windows 8 and instead published it as a free game on the Microsoft Store. The new version is developed by Arkadium and is ad-supported. The initial release was supported by 30-second video ads. Later releases had monthly and annual subscription options to remove the ads. Multiple news outlets criticized the change as greedy. This version updates both motifs (themes called "Modern" and "Garden" as of Windows 10). Daily challenges and an adventure mode were also added.

As of Windows 10, the non-premium version has six modes of play: Classic (8x8), Easy (9x9), Medium (16x16), Expert (30x16), Custom, Adventure, and Daily Challenges. "Retro" theme or the default modern theme are available. On the main menu, there are sections for Awards, Leaderboards, Statistics, and Tutorials.

Some of the game options are only relevant for a touchscreen, like the flag mode and swiping.

== Reception ==
Business Insider called the game an "iconic part" of the Windows operating system.
