= List of backward-compatible games for Xbox One and Series X/S =

The Xbox One gaming system has received updates from Microsoft since its launch in 2013 that enable it to play select games from its two predecessor consoles, Xbox and Xbox 360. On June 15, 2015, backward compatibility with Xbox 360 games became available to eligible Xbox Preview program users with a beta update to the Xbox One system software. The dashboard update containing backward compatibility was released publicly on November 12, 2015. On October 24, 2017, another such update added games from the original Xbox library. The Xbox Series X/S was released in 2020 and was confirmed to be backwards compatible with the same list of games as the Xbox One at launch. On November 15, 2021, a "final addition" of 69 titles was published as part of the 20th anniversary of the launch of the original Xbox console. This is the following list of all backward-compatible games on Xbox One and Xbox Series X/S under this functionality.

== History ==
At its launch in November 2013, the Xbox One did not have native backward compatibility with original Xbox or Xbox 360 games. Xbox Live director of programming Larry "Major Nelson" Hryb suggested users could use the HDMI-in port on the console to pass an Xbox 360 or any other device with HDMI output through Xbox One. Senior project management and planning director Albert Penello explained that Microsoft was considering a cloud gaming platform to enable backward compatibility, but he felt it would be "problematic" due to varying internet connection qualities.

=== Xbox 360 ===
During Microsoft's E3 2015 press conference on June 15, 2015, Microsoft announced plans to introduce Xbox 360 backward compatibility on the Xbox One at no additional cost. Supported Xbox 360 games will run within an emulator and have access to certain Xbox One features, such as recording and broadcasting gameplay. Games do not run directly from discs. A repackaged form of the game is downloaded automatically when a supported game is inserted, while digitally-purchased games will automatically appear for download in the user's library once available. As with Xbox One titles, if the game is installed using physical media, the disc is still required for validation purposes.

Not all Xbox 360 games are supported; 104 Xbox 360 games were available for the feature's public launch on November 12, 2015, with Xbox One preview program members getting early access. Launch games included the Gears of War series, Mass Effect, Borderlands, Mirror's Edge, Assassin's Creed II, and more. Microsoft stated that publishers will only need to provide permission to the company to allow the repackaging, and they expect the list to grow significantly over time. Unlike the emulation of original Xbox games on the Xbox 360, the Xbox One does not require game modification, since it emulates an exact replica of its predecessor's environment – both hardware and software operating systems. The downloaded game is a repackaged version of the original that identifies itself as an Xbox One title to the console. At Gamescom, Microsoft revealed it has plans to ensure "all future Xbox 360 Games with Gold titles will be playable on Xbox One." On December 17, 2015, Microsoft made another sixteen Xbox 360 games compatible with Xbox One, including titles such as Halo: Reach, Fable III, and Deus Ex: Human Revolution. On January 21, 2016, Microsoft made another ten Xbox 360 games compatible, including The Witcher 2: Assassins of Kings and Counter-Strike: Global Offensive. On May 13, 2016, Microsoft made Xbox 360 titles with multiple discs compatible, starting with Deus Ex: Human Revolution Director's Cut. In January 2016, Microsoft announced that future titles would be added as they became available, instead of waiting until a specific day each month.

=== Original Xbox ===
During Microsoft's E3 2017 press conference on June 11, 2017, Microsoft announced that roughly 50% of Xbox One users had played an Xbox 360 game on Xbox One through the system's backward-compatibility feature. Based on popular demand, Phil Spencer, Microsoft's Head of Xbox, announced that Xbox One consoles would be able to play 13 games made for the original Xbox console, first released in 2001. The compatibility works on all consoles in the Xbox One family, including the Xbox One X, and was made available as a free update in the fall of 2017.

The functionality is similar to that for back-compatibility with Xbox 360 games. Users insert the Xbox game disc into their Xbox One console to install the compatible version of the game. While players are not able to access any old game saves or connect to Xbox Live on these titles, system link functions will remain available. Xbox games do not receive achievement support, although when asked about this component, Spencer responded that they had nothing to announce at the current time.

Realizing that game discs for original Xbox consoles could be scarce, Spencer said that plans were in place to make compatible Xbox games available digitally. Spencer also said that such games may also be incorporated into the Xbox Game Pass subscription service. In a later interview, Spencer indicated that the potential library of Xbox titles being playable on Xbox One will be smaller than that currently available from the Xbox 360 library. Spencer noted two reasons for the more limited library were the availability of content rights for the games and the technical difficulties related to the conversion.

=== Xbox Series X/S ===
At its press briefing for E3 2019 on June 9, 2019, Microsoft announced its future gaming console, Xbox Series X, scheduled for release for the 2020 holiday season. One of the Series X's features includes full backward compatibility with all Xbox One titles and the list of original Xbox and Xbox 360 titles currently available, excluding those that required the Kinect. As Microsoft's future events were directed towards the new platform, additional efforts to bring original Xbox and Xbox 360 titles to Xbox One were stopped. This was meant to set a fixed target for testing of backward compatibility titles for the Xbox Series X as to make sure their full library was ready in time for launch.

By May 2020, as the Xbox Series X was nearing release, Microsoft announced they were seeking further requests from players of what games to expand their backward compatibility library with. The company stated, "Resurrecting titles from history often presents a complex mix of technical and licensing challenges, but the team is committed to doing everything we can to continue to preserve our collective gaming legacy."

In September 2020, Microsoft announced that the Xbox Series S will run Xbox One S versions of backward compatible games while applying improved texture, faster loading speeds, higher frame rates and auto HDR.

In September 2021, seven original Xbox titles, including Dead or Alive 3 and Dead or Alive Ultimate, were briefly added to the Microsoft Store before being delisted, implying the return of the program. In October, two Xbox 360 titles were added. Then, in November, 11 original Xbox titles were added to the Xbox 360 Marketplace.

On November 15, 2021, Microsoft released a "latest and final addition" of 76 titles to the list of backwards compatible games, stating they "have reached the limit of our ability to bring new games to the catalog from the past due to licensing, legal and technical constraints".

As of April 2024, Microsoft unveiled they are assembling a new team focused on backwards compatibility and game preservation which might add even more games to the list. Xbox boss, Sarah Bond, stated: "We have formed a new team dedicated to game preservation, important to all of us at Xbox and the industry itself. We are building on our strong history of delivering backwards compatibility to our players, and we remain committed to bringing forward the amazing library of Xbox games for future generations of players to enjoy." There were layoffs within the Xbox division in July 2026, which included Kevin LaChapelle, who previously had led Xbox's Backwards Compatibility and Cloud Gaming programs.

=== PC ===
On July 22, 2026, Microsoft announced Xbox backwards compatibility for the Windows PC platform, bringing native Xbox console emulation to PC. Unlike backwards compatibility on Xbox consoles, this one is digital only and legacy Xbox physical discs cannot be played. That same day the first four games of the program were released: Conker: Live and Reloaded, BLiNX: The Time Sweeper, Crimson Skies: High Road to Revenge, and Fuzion Frenzy. These games are available through the Xbox app on Windows with support of Xbox Play Anywhere, meaning that purchased digital copies are also available on Xbox One and Series X/S consoles with no additional cost, and are available across all tiers of Xbox Game Pass or can be directly purchased including by non-Xbox users.

Microsoft has confirmed customizable graphics settings, including up to 4x resolution upscaling, V-Sync support, fullscreen and windowed display modes, anisotropic filtering, enhanced anti-aliasing, and more for these games. It also confirmed that Achievements will be coming to both the PC and console versions of the four games within the coming months.

On November 12th, 2026, during the celebration of Xbox's 25th Anniversary, Xbox has announced the expansion of backwards compatibility program for 21 more original Xbox console games on Windows: Armed and Dangerous, Chicken Little, The Elder Scrolls III: Morrowind, Grabbed by the Ghoulies, Indiana Jones and the Emperor’s Tomb, Red Faction II, Secret Weapons Over Normandy, Star Wars Battlefront, Star Wars Battlefront II, Star Wars Episode III: Revenge of the Sith, Star Wars Jedi Knight: Jedi Academy, Star Wars Jedi Knight II Jedi Outcast, Star Wars: Jedi Starfighter, Star Wars: Knights of the Old Republic, Star Wars: Knights of the Old Republic II – The Sith Lords, Star Wars: Republic Commando, Star Wars: Starfighter – Special Edition, Star Wars: The Clone Wars, Thrillville, TimeSplitters 2 and TimeSplitters: Future Perfect. All these games support Xbox Play Anywhere. Xbox has also stated that Star Wars: Knights of the Old Republic, Star Wars: Knights of the Old Republic II --The Sith Lords, BLiNX: The Time Sweeper, and Conker: Live and Reloaded will now support Xbox Achievements.

== Standard backwards compatibility improvements ==
The following improvements are made to all backwards compatibility titles:

- Improved frame rate stability – The increased performance of the Xbox One allows titles to hit and maintain their frame rate target more consistently.
- Games utilizing a dynamic resolution will hit their max resolution more often, or at all times due to the increased performance of the Xbox One.
- 16x anisotropic filtering – Greatly enhances the quality of textures.
- Forced V-sync – Prevents screen tearing.
- Variable refresh rate compatibility – Allows displays to match the current frame rate of the console, preventing stuttering and tearing and improving the smoothness of motion. A compatible display is required for variable refresh rates.

== Xbox One X and Xbox Series X and S enhancements ==
Backwards compatible original Xbox and Xbox 360 titles will benefit from becoming Xbox One X enhanced with patches targeted at maximizing the use of the Xbox One X's hardware beyond the standard improvements that come with backwards compatibility. This may also include the following enhancements:

- Increased resolution – The title is capable of outputting up to 2160p. Enhanced games are rendered at 9x their original resolution. This means games that originally ran at 720p will run at 2160p (4K) on capable displays.
- HDR – The title supports HDR10 when used with a supporting display.
- Dolby Atmos – The title supports Dolby Atmos surround sound when used with a supporting sound system.

Along with these enhancements, certain titles on the Xbox Series X/S benefit from exclusive features:

- Auto HDR — Many titles do not support native HDR, but rather Auto HDR, an automatic form of HDR.
- FPS Boost — Some titles support increased frame rates of up to 60 frames per second and 120 frames per second.

== List of compatible titles from Xbox 360 ==
There are 632 games that have been made backward compatible out of 2,155 that have been released for Xbox 360.

compatible titles from Xbox 360
Title	Publisher(s)	Format	Xbox One X enhanced	FPS Boost	Date added	Notes/references
0 Day Attack on Earth	Square Enix	XBLA			October 26, 2017	
3D Ultra Minigolf Adventures	Activision	XBLA			April 20, 2017	
50 Cent: Blood on the Sand	THQ	Disc Only			November 15, 2021	
Ace Combat 6: Fires of Liberation	Bandai Namco Entertainment	Disc Only			January 16, 2019	Available digitally as a pre-order bonus with Ace Combat 7: Skies Unknown.
Aces of the Galaxy	Activision	XBLA			November 15, 2021	
Adventure Time: The Secret of the Nameless Kingdom	Little Orbit				November 15, 2021	
Aegis Wing	Microsoft Studios	XBLA			January 21, 2016	
Age of Booty	Capcom	XBLA (Delisted)			January 21, 2016	
AirMech Arena	Ubisoft	XBLA (Delisted)			March 21, 2019	Also released on Xbox One. Xbox 360 version is no longer available for purchase.
Alan Wake	Microsoft Studios			Yes	March 17, 2016	Also available as a bonus with purchase of Quantum Break. Also available as a remastered version for Xbox One and Series X/S.
Alan Wake's American Nightmare	Microsoft Studios	XBLA			February 11, 2016	Also included as a pre-order bonus with Quantum Break.
Alice: Madness Returns	Electronic Arts				January 24, 2017	Available in The Play List on EA Play.
Alien Hominid HD	Microsoft Studios	XBLA			November 12, 2015	Available to Xbox One Preview Program Members on June 15, 2015, and also available on Xbox One and Xbox Series X/S.
Aliens vs. Predator	Sega				November 29, 2018	
Altered Beast	Sega	XBLA (Delisted)			April 26, 2016	Also available in Sega Genesis Classics for Xbox One.
Anomaly: Warzone Earth	Microsoft Studios	XBLA			June 7, 2016	
Aqua	Microsoft Studios	XBLA			June 7, 2016	
Are You Smarter Than A 5th Grader?	THQ	XBLA (Delisted)			November 15, 2021	
Arkanoid Live!	Taito Corporation	XBLA			September 8, 2016	
Army of Two	Electronic Arts				March 28, 2017	Available in The Play List on EA Play.
Assassin's Creed	Ubisoft		Yes	Yes	March 21, 2016	
Assassin's Creed II	Ubisoft				November 12, 2015	Also available in Assassin's Creed: The Ezio Collection, which includes remastered versions of Assassin's Creed II, Assassin's Creed: Brotherhood and Assassin's Creed Revelations for Xbox One.
Assassin's Creed III	Ubisoft	Disc Only			May 23, 2017	Also available in Assassin's Creed III: Remastered, which includes remastered versions of Assassin's Creed III and Assassin's Creed: Liberation HD for Xbox One. Uncapped frame rate.
Assassin's Creed Liberation HD	Ubisoft	XBLA (Delisted)			July 3, 2018	Also available in Assassin's Creed III: Remastered, which includes remastered versions of Assassin's Creed III and Assassin's Creed: Liberation HD for Xbox One.
Assassin's Creed IV: Black Flag	Ubisoft	Disc Only			April 3, 2018	Also released for Xbox One as a launch title.
Assassin's Creed: Brotherhood	Ubisoft	Disc Only			June 27, 2017	Also available in Assassin's Creed: The Ezio Collection, which includes remastered versions of Assassin's Creed II, Assassin's Creed: Brotherhood and Assassin's Creed Revelations for Xbox One.
Assassin's Creed Revelations	Ubisoft				March 23, 2017	Also available in Assassin's Creed: The Ezio Collection, which includes remastered versions of Assassin's Creed II, Assassin's Creed: Brotherhood and Assassin's Creed Revelations for Xbox One.
Assassin's Creed Rogue	Ubisoft				February 23, 2017	Also available as a remastered version on Xbox One.
Assault Heroes 2	Activision	XBLA			April 25, 2017	
Asteroids & Deluxe	Atari	XBLA			November 12, 2015	Games are also available as part of Atari Flashback Classics Volume 2 for Xbox One.
AstroPop	Electronic Arts	XBLA			November 29, 2016	
Asura's Wrath	Capcom				June 10, 2019	Uncapped frame rate.
Avatar: The Last Airbender – The Burning Earth	THQ				November 15, 2021	
Axel & Pixel	2K Games	XBLA (Delisted)			March 13, 2018	
Babel Rising	Ubisoft	XBLA (Delisted)			June 16, 2016	
Band of Bugs	Microsoft Studios	XBLA			May 4, 2017	
Banjo-Kazooie	Microsoft Studios	XBLA	Yes		November 12, 2015	Available to Xbox One Preview Program Members on June 15, 2015. Also included as part of the Rare Replay collection of games. Available via Game Pass.
Banjo-Kazooie: Nuts & Bolts	Microsoft Game Studios		Yes		November 12, 2015	Available to Xbox One Preview Program Members on August 4, 2015. Also included as part of the Rare Replay collection of games. Available via Game Pass.
Banjo-Tooie	Microsoft Studios	XBLA	Yes		November 12, 2015	Available to Xbox One Preview Program Members on June 15, 2015. Also included as part of the Rare Replay collection of games. Available via Game Pass.
Bankshot Billiards 2	Microsoft Studios	XBLA			November 15, 2021	
Batman: Arkham Origins	Warner Bros. Interactive Entertainment	Disc Only			August 8, 2017	Uncapped frame rate.
BattleBlock Theater	Microsoft Studios	XBLA			November 12, 2015	Available to Xbox One Preview Program Members on June 15, 2015.
Battlefield 1943	Electronic Arts	XBLA (Delisted)			May 24, 2018	Delisted on July 3, 2024.
Battlefield 2: Modern Combat	Electronic Arts	Disc Only			June 10, 2019	
Battlefield 3	Electronic Arts	Disc Only			January 10, 2017	Available in The Play List on EA Play.
Battlefield: Bad Company	Electronic Arts	Disc Only			August 17, 2017	Delisted on July 3, 2024.
Battlefield: Bad Company 2	Electronic Arts	Disc Only			January 10, 2017	Delisted on July 3, 2024.
Battlestations: Pacific	Eidos Interactive				January 10, 2019	
Battlestations: Midway	Eidos Interactive				October 11, 2016	
Bayonetta	Sega				September 8, 2016	Also available as a remastered version on Xbox One.
Beat'n Groovy	Konami	XBLA			January 12, 2017	
Beautiful Katamari	Namco				November 15, 2021	
Bejeweled 2	Microsoft Studios	XBLA			November 12, 2015	Available on the Xbox Live Arcade Unplugged disc. Available in The Play List on EA Play.
Bejeweled 3	PopCap Games	XBLA			September 6, 2016	Available in The Play List on EA Play.
Bellator: MMA Onslaught	345 Games	XBLA			November 12, 2015	
Beyond Good & Evil HD	Ubisoft	XBLA (Delisted)			November 12, 2015	Also available as a remastered version titled "20th Anniversary Edition" for Xbox One & Series X/S.
Binary Domain	Sega			Yes	November 15, 2021	
Bionic Commando Rearmed 2	Capcom	XBLA			July 21, 2016	
BioShock	2K Games				December 13, 2016	Based on the Ultimate Rapture Edition that includes bonus content. Also available in BioShock: The Collection, featuring remastered versions of all three BioShock titles as well as its downloadable content on Xbox One.
BioShock 2	2K Games				December 13, 2016	Also available in BioShock: The Collection, featuring remastered versions of all three BioShock titles as well as its downloadable content on Xbox One.
BioShock Infinite	2K Games				December 13, 2016	Also available in BioShock: The Collection, featuring remastered versions of all three BioShock titles as well as its downloadable content on Xbox One.
Black College Football: BCFX: The Xperience	Aspyr				November 15, 2021	
Blazing Angels: Squadrons of WWII	Ubisoft	Disc Only			June 27, 2017	
Blood Knights	Kalypso Media	XBLA			June 23, 2016	
Blood of the Werewolf	Midnight City	XBLA			November 12, 2015	
Bloodforge	Microsoft Studios	XBLA			June 30, 2016	
BloodRayne: Betrayal	Majesco	XBLA (Delisted)			November 12, 2015	Also available as a remastered version titled "BloodRayne Betrayal: Fresh Bites" for Xbox One and Series X/S.
Blue Dragon	Microsoft Studios				November 1, 2016	Only requires 1 of the 3 discs to play fully. Disc switches automatically.
Bolt	Disney Interactive Studios				August 8, 2017	
Bomberman Live: Battlefest	Hudson Soft	XBLA			August 18, 2016	
Boom Boom Rocket	Electronic Arts	XBLA			July 26, 2016	Also available when Xbox Live Arcade Compilation Disc is inserted.
Borderlands	2K Games				November 12, 2015	Available to Xbox One Preview Program Members on September 3, 2015. All versions of the game, including physical and digital copies, receive all DLC as a free download (on Xbox One only). Also available in a remastered version.
Borderlands 2	2K Games				February 23, 2017	Also available in Borderlands: The Handsome Collection which includes remastered versions of Borderlands 2 and Borderlands: The Pre-Sequel for Xbox One. The Borderlands 2 DLC Install Disc included in the Borderlands Triple Pack released in 2015 is also compatible, install the add-on disc first before the base game.
Bound by Flame	Focus Home Interactive				September 15, 2016	
Braid	Microsoft Studios	XBLA			December 17, 2015	Also available in a remastered version for Xbox One.
Brain Challenge	Microsoft Studios	XBLA			June 16, 2016	
Brave: The Video Game	Disney Interactive Studios				February 20, 2018	
Brothers in Arms: Hell's Highway	Ubisoft				March 21, 2019	
Brütal Legend	Double Fine Productions				September 18, 2018	Available via Game Pass.
Bullet Soul	5pb.				May 4, 2017	
Bullet Soul -Infinite Burst-	5pb.				May 4, 2017	
Bully: Scholarship Edition	Rockstar Games				December 15, 2016	
The Bureau: XCOM Declassified	2K Games				December 4, 2018	
Burnout Paradise	Electronic Arts	Disc Only			November 22, 2016	Remastered as Burnout Paradise Remastered for Xbox One.
Burnout Revenge	Electronic Arts				May 8, 2018	The original Xbox version of this game is not compatible.
Cabela's Alaskan Adventures	Activision	Disc Only			April 27, 2017	
Cabela's Dangerous Hunts 2013	Activision	Disc Only			April 27, 2017	
Cabela's Hunting Expeditions	Activision	Disc Only			April 27, 2017	
Cabela's Survival: Shadows of Katmai	Activision	Disc Only			April 27, 2017	
Call of Duty 2	Activision				August 23, 2016	
Call of Duty 3	Activision				September 22, 2016	
Call of Duty 4: Modern Warfare	Activision				March 29, 2018	Also available in a remastered version.
Call of Duty: Advanced Warfare	Activision	Disc Only			September 28, 2017	Also released on Xbox One.
Call of Duty: Black Ops	Activision				May 17, 2016	
Call of Duty: Black Ops II	Activision				April 11, 2017	
Call of Duty: Ghosts	Activision	Disc Only			June 29, 2017	Also released for Xbox One as a launch title. For the Xbox 360 version, disc 1 of 2 is the only one recognized.
Call of Duty: Modern Warfare 2	Activision				August 28, 2018	Campaign remastered for Xbox One.
Call of Duty: Modern Warfare 3	Activision				June 19, 2018	
Call of Duty: World at War	Activision				September 27, 2016	
Call of Juarez: Bound in Blood	Techland				September 25, 2018	
Call of Juarez: The Cartel	Techland				September 25, 2018	
Call of Juarez: Gunslinger	Techland	XBLA			November 12, 2015	
Capcom Arcade Cabinet	Capcom	XBLA			July 21, 2016	Multiple included games also available in Capcom Arcade Stadium for Xbox One.
Carcassonne	Microsoft Studios	XBLA			February 26, 2016	
Cars Mater-National Championship	Disney Interactive Studios				November 14, 2017	
Cars 2: The Video Game	Disney Interactive Studios				March 2, 2017	
Castle Crashers	Microsoft Studios	XBLA (Delisted)			November 12, 2015	Also available in a remastered version for Xbox One. Cannot purchase original version on Microsoft Store.
Castle of Illusion Starring Mickey Mouse	Sega	XBLA			August 30, 2016	
CastleStorm	Microsoft Studios	XBLA			November 12, 2015	Also released on Xbox One.
Castlevania: Harmony of Despair	Konami	XBLA			March 14, 2019	
Castlevania: Lords of Shadow	Konami				October 30, 2018	
Castlevania: Lords of Shadow 2	Konami				October 30, 2018	
Castlevania: Lords of Shadow – Mirror of Fate HD	Konami	XBLA			October 30, 2018	
Castlevania: Symphony of the Night	Konami	XBLA			March 17, 2016	Also Available if the Konami Classics Vol. 1 disc is inserted.
Catherine	Atlus				December 15, 2016	
The Cave	Sega	XBLA (Delisted)			April 26, 2016	Can no longer be purchased on Microsoft Store. Available via Game Pass.
Centipede & Millipede	Atari	XBLA			November 12, 2015	Games are also available as part of Atari Flashback Classics Volume 1 for Xbox One.
Child of Eden	Ubisoft	Disc Only			October 12, 2017	
Clannad	Prototype				December 15, 2016	Japan only.
Cloning Clyde	Microsoft Studios	XBLA			November 15, 2021	
Comic Jumper: The Adventures of Captain Smiley	Microsoft Studios	XBLA			June 23, 2016	
Comix Zone	Sega	XBLA			April 26, 2016	Also available in Sega Genesis Classics for Xbox One.
Command & Conquer 3: Kane's Wrath	Electronic Arts				January 24, 2019	
Command & Conquer 3: Tiberium Wars	Electronic Arts				January 24, 2019	
Command & Conquer: Red Alert 3	Electronic Arts				January 24, 2019	
Command & Conquer: Red Alert 3 – Commander's Challenge	Electronic Arts	XBLA			January 24, 2019	
Commanders: Attack of the Genos	Activision	XBLA			April 25, 2017	
Conan	THQ				November 15, 2021	
Condemned: Criminal Origins	Sega	Disc Only			November 12, 2015	
Contra	Konami	XBLA			April 20, 2017	Also included in the Contra Anniversary Collection for Xbox One.
Costume Quest	THQ	XBLA			May 7, 2019	Available via Game Pass.
Costume Quest 2	Midnight City	XBLA			July 18, 2017	Also released on Xbox One.
Counter-Strike: Global Offensive	Valve	XBLA (Delisted)			January 21, 2016	
Crackdown	Microsoft Studios		Yes		February 27, 2018	
Crackdown 2	Microsoft Game Studios				March 8, 2019	
Crazy Taxi	Sega	XBLA (Delisted)			November 12, 2015	Also available when the Dreamcast Collection disc is inserted.
Crysis	Electronic Arts	XBLA			October 16, 2018	Available in The Play List on EA Play. Also remastered for Xbox One.
Crysis 2	Electronic Arts				October 16, 2018	Available in The Play List on EA Play. Also remastered for Xbox One.
Crysis 3	Electronic Arts	Disc Only			October 16, 2018	Available in The Play List on EA Play. Also remastered for Xbox One.
Crystal Defenders	Square Enix	XBLA			July 21, 2016	
Crystal Quest	Microsoft Studios	XBLA			June 23, 2016	
Cyber Troopers Virtual-On Oratorio Tangram	Sega	XBLA			June 27, 2017	
Dante's Inferno	Electronic Arts				July 17, 2018	Available in The Play List on EA Play.
Dark Souls	Bandai Namco Entertainment	Disc Only			March 23, 2016	Available as a digital pre-order bonus with Dark Souls III. Also available in a remastered version.
Dark Void	Capcom				March 21, 2016	
The Darkness	2K Games				December 4, 2018	
The Darkness II	2K Games				January 30, 2018	
Darksiders	THQ		Yes	Yes	March 23, 2017	Uncapped frame rate. Remastered as Darksiders: Warmastered Edition for Xbox One.
Darksiders II	THQ	Disc Only			March 23, 2017	Remastered as Darksiders II: Deathinitive Edition for Xbox One.
Darwinia+	Microsoft Studios	XBLA			November 15, 2021	
Daytona USA	Sega	XBLA (Delisted)			March 21, 2017	
de Blob 2	THQ				September 8, 2016	Also released on Xbox One.
Dead or Alive 4	Tecmo				November 15, 2021	
Dead Rising 2: Case West	Capcom	XBLA			March 2, 2017	
Dead Rising 2: Case Zero	Capcom	XBLA			March 2, 2017	
Dead Space	Electronic Arts				March 30, 2016	Available in The Play List on EA Play. Also available in a remastered version.
Dead Space 2	Electronic Arts			Yes	April 27, 2017	Available in The Play List on EA Play.
Dead Space 3	Electronic Arts			Yes	April 27, 2017	Available in The Play List on EA Play.
Dead Space Ignition	Electronic Arts	XBLA			November 15, 2016	Available in The Play List on EA Play.
Deadfall Adventures	Nordic Games				October 26, 2017	
Deadliest Warrior: Legends	345 Games; Spike Games	XBLA			November 12, 2015	Disc version incompatible.
Deadliest Warrior: The Game	Spike Games	XBLA			August 8, 2017	Disc version incompatible.
Deadly Premonition	Marvelous Entertainment				November 2, 2017	
Death by Cube	Square Enix	XBLA			November 15, 2021	
DeathSpank: Thongs of Virtue	Electronic Arts	XBLA			September 6, 2016	
Defense Grid: The Awakening	Microsoft Studios	XBLA (Delisted)			November 12, 2015	Available to Xbox One Preview Program Members on June 15, 2015.
Deus Ex: Human Revolution	Eidos Interactive				December 17, 2015	
Deus Ex: Human Revolution Director's Cut	Eidos Interactive	Disc Only			May 10, 2016	First Multi-Disc game made available.
Dig Dug	Bandai Namco Entertainment	XBLA			May 5, 2016	Also available as part of the Xbox One Arcade Game Series.
Dirt 3	Codemasters	Disc Only			November 12, 2015	Delisted in January 2017, presumably to license expiration.
Dirt: Showdown	Codemasters	Disc Only			November 12, 2015	
Discs of Tron	Disney Interactive Studios	XBLA			November 12, 2015	
Disney Universe	Disney Interactive Studios				November 15, 2021	Bulldog boss crashes the game on the Nightmare Before Christmas DLC level.
Divinity II	Focus Home Interactive				April 3, 2018	Only The Dragon Knight Saga version is compatible.
Domino Master	Microsoft Studios	XBLA			May 24, 2016	
Doom	Bethesda Softworks	XBLA (Delisted)			November 12, 2015	Available as a digital pre-order bonus with Doom (2016) on Microsoft Store. Delisted on July 26, 2019, following the Xbox One release of Doom. Accessible through Doom 3: BFG Edition.
Doom 3: BFG Edition	Bethesda Softworks	Disc Only			April 14, 2016	Available as a remastered version on Xbox One.
Doom II: Hell on Earth	Bethesda Softworks	XBLA (Delisted)			November 12, 2015	Available as a digital pre-order bonus with Doom (2016) on Microsoft Store. Delisted on July 26, 2019, following the Xbox One release of Doom II. Accessible through Doom 3: BFG Edition
Doritos Crash Course	Microsoft Studios	XBLA			December 17, 2015	
Double Dragon Neon	Majesco	XBLA			April 26, 2016	
Dragon Age: Origins	Electronic Arts			Yes	January 10, 2017	Available in The Play List on EA Play.
Dragon Age II	Electronic Arts			Yes	May 3, 2018	Available in The Play List on EA Play.
Dragon's Lair	Microsoft Studios	XBLA			October 11, 2016	Also available in the Dragon's Lair Trilogy on Xbox One.
Driver: San Francisco	Ubisoft	Disc Only			January 16, 2018	
DuckTales: Remastered	Capcom				May 24, 2016	
Duke Nukem Forever	2K Games				December 4, 2018	
Duke Nukem: Manhattan Project	Gearbox Software	XBLA			April 12, 2016	
Dungeon Siege III	Square Enix				November 16, 2015	
Dungeons & Dragons: Chronicles of Mystara	Capcom	XBLA			June 23, 2016	
Earth Defense Force 2017	D3 Publisher				November 30, 2017	
Earth Defense Force 2025	D3 Publisher				August 7, 2018	
Earth Defense Force: Insect Armageddon	D3 Publisher				July 11, 2017	
Earthworm Jim HD	Microsoft Studios	XBLA (Delisted)			November 12, 2015	
Eat Lead: The Return of Matt Hazard	D3 Publisher				October 13, 2016	
The Elder Scrolls IV: Oblivion	Bethesda		Yes	Yes	November 29, 2016	Owners of the Game of the Year Edition and the 5th Anniversary Edition can run the game with the "Knights of the Nine” and the “Shivering Isles” DLC using disc 2. Available via Game Pass.
Elements of Destruction	THQ	XBLA			November 15, 2021	
Enchanted Arms	Ubisoft	Disc Only			June 10, 2019	
Encleverment Experiment	Microsoft Studios	XBLA			September 27, 2016	
Enslaved: Odyssey to the West	Bandai Namco Entertainment				June 10, 2019	
Epic Mickey 2: The Power of Two	Disney Interactive Studios				August 3, 2017	
Escape Dead Island	Deep Silver				November 15, 2016	
Every Extend Extra Extreme	Q Entertainment	XBLA			September 27, 2016	
F.E.A.R.	Vivendi Universal Games	Disc Only		Yes	November 15, 2021	
F.E.A.R. 2: Project Origin	Warner Bros. Interactive Entertainment				November 15, 2021	Uncapped frame rate.
F.E.A.R. 3	Warner Bros. Interactive Entertainment			Yes	November 15, 2021	
F.E.A.R. Files	Vivendi Universal Games	Disc Only			November 15, 2021	
F1 2014	Codemasters	Disc Only			July 11, 2017	
Fable Anniversary	Xbox Game Studios		Yes	Yes	October 5, 2017	
Fable Heroes	Microsoft Studios	XBLA			June 26, 2018	
Fable II	Xbox Game Studios		Yes		November 12, 2015	
Fable II Pub Games	Microsoft Studios	XBLA			October 5, 2017	
Fable III	Xbox Game Studios		Yes	Yes	December 17, 2015	
Faery: Legends of Avalon	Focus Home Interactive	XBLA			May 10, 2016	
Fallout 3	Bethesda Softworks		Yes	Yes	November 12, 2015	Was also available as a bonus with purchase of Fallout 4. Also, owners of the Xbox 360 Game of the Year Edition can run the game with all the DLC using disc 2. Available via Game Pass.
Fallout: New Vegas	Bethesda Softworks			Yes	June 23, 2016	Owners of the Xbox 360 Ultimate Edition can run the game with all the DLC using disc 2.Available via Game Pass.
Far Cry 2	Ubisoft				January 16, 2018	
Far Cry 3	Ubisoft			Yes	March 30, 2017	Given to players who owned the season pass of Far Cry 5 as a bonus on May 29, 2018. Later released as a standalone product titled Far Cry 3 Classic Edition on June 26, 2018. Classic Edition does not include multiplayer.
Far Cry 3: Blood Dragon	Ubisoft	XBLA			August 9, 2016	Also available in a remastered edition.
Far Cry Classic	Ubisoft	XBLA			June 10, 2019	
Far Cry Instincts: Predator	Ubisoft				June 10, 2019	
Feeding Frenzy	Electronic Arts	XBLA			November 12, 2015	Available in The Play List on EA Play. Also available when Xbox Live Arcade Compilation Disc is inserted.
Feeding Frenzy 2: Shipwreck Showdown	PopCap Games	XBLA			November 12, 2015	Available in The Play List on EA Play.
Fight Night Champion	Electronic Arts				May 15, 2018	Available in The Play List on EA Play.
Fighting Vipers	Sega	XBLA			August 8, 2017	
Final Fantasy XIII	Square Enix		Yes		November 13, 2018	
Final Fantasy XIII-2	Square Enix		Yes	Yes	November 13, 2018	
Final Fight: Double Impact	Capcom	XBLA (Delisted)			May 10, 2016	
The First Templar	Kalypso Media				November 15, 2021	
Flashback	Ubisoft	XBLA			June 16, 2016	
Flock!	Capcom	XBLA			July 19, 2016	
Forza Horizon	Microsoft Studios	Disc Only	Yes		August 30, 2016	
Foul Play	Sold Out	XBLA			June 9, 2016	
Fret Nice	Tecmo	XBLA			July 21, 2016	
Frogger	Konami	XBLA			April 28, 2016	Also Available if the Konami Classics Vol. 1 disc is inserted.
Frogger 2	Konami	XBLA			May 10, 2016	
From Dust	Ubisoft	XBLA			May 7, 2019	
Frontlines: Fuel of War	THQ				July 18, 2017	
Fuel	Codemasters	Disc Only			January 10, 2019	
FunTown Mahjong	Microsoft Studios	XBLA			September 27, 2016	
Galaga	Namco Bandai Games	XBLA			February 15, 2016	Also available as part of the Xbox One Arcade Game Series.
Galaga Legions	Bandai Namco Entertainment	XBLA			October 20, 2016	
Galaga Legions DX	Bandai Namco Entertainment	XBLA			April 28, 2016	
Garou: Mark of the Wolves	SNK Playmore	XBLA			April 12, 2016	Also released as part of the ACA NeoGeo Series for Xbox One
Gatling Gears	Intergrow	XBLA			September 6, 2016	
Gears of War	Microsoft Studios			Yes	November 12, 2015	Available to Xbox One Preview Program Members on August 3, 2015. Was also available as a bonus with purchase of Gears of War: Ultimate Edition, itself a remastered version of the original game.Available via Game Pass.
Gears of War 2	Microsoft Studios		Yes	Yes	November 12, 2015	Was also available as a bonus with purchase of Gears of War: Ultimate Edition.Available via Game Pass.
Gears of War 3	Microsoft Studios		Yes	Yes	November 12, 2015	Was also available as a bonus with purchase of Gears of War: Ultimate Edition.Available via Game Pass.
Gears of War: Judgment	Microsoft Studios			Yes	November 12, 2015	Was also available as a bonus with purchase of Gears of War: Ultimate Edition.Available via Game Pass.
Geometry Wars 3: Dimensions	Sierra	XBLA			May 2, 2017	Also released on Xbox One.
Geometry Wars: Retro Evolved	Microsoft Studios	XBLA			February 25, 2016	Available on the Xbox Live Arcade Unplugged disc.
Geometry Wars: Retro Evolved 2	Activision	XBLA			May 2, 2017	Also available when the Xbox Live Arcade Game Pack disc is inserted.
Ghostbusters: Sanctum of Slime	Atari	XBLA			April 26, 2016	
Ghostbusters: The Video Game	Atari				January 10, 2017	Also available as a remastered version on Xbox One.
Gin Rummy	Activision	XBLA			April 20, 2017	
Girl Fight	Majesco	XBLA			October 26, 2017	
Go! Go! Break Steady	Microsoft Studios	XBLA			June 30, 2016	
Goat Simulator	Double Eleven Limited	XBLA			October 12, 2017	Also released on Xbox One.
Golden Axe	Sega	XBLA			November 12, 2015	Arcade version.
Golf: Tee It Up!	Activision	XBLA			April 20, 2017	
Grand Theft Auto IV	Rockstar Games				February 9, 2017	Uncapped frame rate. Including "Episodes From Liberty City" DLC expansions: The Lost and Damned and The Ballad of Gay Tony.
Grand Theft Auto: San Andreas	Rockstar Games	Disc Only			June 7, 2018	Also available in Grand Theft Auto: The Trilogy – The Definitive Edition. Original version was delisted following this but was added back as of December 2021.
Greg Hastings Paintball 2	Majesco	Disc Only			September 18, 2018	
Grid 2	Codemasters	Disc Only			March 21, 2016	
Grid Autosport	Codemasters	Disc Only			June 26, 2018	
GripShift	Microsoft Studios	XBLA			June 30, 2016	
Guardian Heroes	Sega	XBLA			November 8, 2016	
Gunstar Heroes	Sega	XBLA			April 6, 2016	Also available in Sega Genesis Classics for Xbox One.
Guwange	CAVE	XBLA			September 29, 2016	
Gyromancer	Square Enix	XBLA			February 23, 2017	
Gyruss	Konami	XBLA			July 25, 2017	
Half-Minute Hero: Super Mega Neo Climax	Microsoft Studios	XBLA			July 19, 2016	
Halo 3	Microsoft Studios	Disc Only	Yes		September 21, 2017	Remastered version available in Halo: The Master Chief Collection.
Halo 3: ODST Campaign Edition	Microsoft Studios	Disc Only			September 21, 2017	Remastered version available in Halo: The Master Chief Collection via downloadable content.
Halo 4	Microsoft Studios	Disc Only			September 21, 2017	Remastered version available in Halo: The Master Chief Collection.
Halo: Combat Evolved Anniversary	Microsoft Studios	Disc Only			September 21, 2017	Remastered version available in Halo: The Master Chief Collection.
Halo: Reach	Microsoft Studios	Disc Only			December 17, 2015	Remastered version available in Halo: The Master Chief Collection via downloadable content.
Halo: Spartan Assault	Microsoft Studios	XBLA (Delisted)			November 12, 2015	Also released on Xbox One. Xbox 360 version is no longer available for purchase.
Halo Wars	Microsoft Studios	Disc Only			March 28, 2016	Remastered version available as Halo Wars: Definitive Edition.
Hard Corps: Uprising	Konami	XBLA			May 4, 2017	
Hardwood Backgammon	Microsoft Studios	XBLA			November 12, 2015	
Hardwood Hearts	Microsoft Studios	XBLA			November 12, 2015	
Hardwood Spades	Microsoft Studios	XBLA			November 12, 2015	
Harms Way	Microsoft Studios	XBLA			May 4, 2017	
Haunted House	Atari	XBLA			December 1, 2016	
Heavy Weapon	Electronic Arts	XBLA			November 12, 2015	Available in The Play List on EA Play.
Hexic 2	Microsoft Studios	XBLA			May 24, 2016	
Hexic HD	Microsoft Studios	XBLA			November 12, 2015	Available to Xbox One Preview Program Members on June 15, 2015. This originally bundled Xbox 360 game can now be downloaded for free in certain regions from Microsoft Store here . Transferring from an Xbox 360 requires that the game be uninstalled from the 360 first and then installed onto the Xbox One.
Hitman: Absolution	Square Enix				February 14, 2017	Hitman: Sniper Challenge pre-order bonus is also compatible. Also available in the Hitman HD Enhanced Collection for Xbox One.
Hitman: Blood Money	IO Interactive				March 6, 2018	Also available in the Hitman HD Enhanced Collection for Xbox One.
Hitman HD Pack	IO Interactive				May 9, 2019	HD versions of Hitman 2: Silent Assassin and Hitman: Contracts.
Hydro Thunder Hurricane	Microsoft Studios	XBLA			December 17, 2015	
Hydrophobia	Microsoft Studios	XBLA			February 26, 2019	
I Am Alive	Ubisoft	XBLA (Delisted)			June 23, 2016	
Ikaruga	Microsoft Studios	XBLA			November 12, 2015	
ilomilo	Microsoft Studios	XBLA			May 23, 2017	
Infinite Undiscovery	Square Enix				June 10, 2019	
Injustice: Gods Among Us	Warner Bros. Interactive Entertainment				December 1, 2016	The Ultimate Edition is disc only.
Insanely Twisted Shadow Planet	Microsoft Studios	XBLA			April 4, 2017	
Interpol: The Trail of Dr. Chaos	Microsoft Studios	XBLA			July 14, 2016	
Iron Brigade	Microsoft Studios	XBLA (Delisted)			December 17, 2015	Available via Game Pass.
Islands of Wakfu	Microsoft Studios	XBLA			November 15, 2021	
Jeremy McGrath's Offroad	D3 Publisher	XBLA			January 21, 2016	
Jet Set Radio HD	Sega	XBLA (Delisted)			May 3, 2016	
Jetpac Refuelled	Microsoft Studios	XBLA			November 12, 2015	Available to Xbox One Preview Program Members on June 15, 2015. Also included as part of the Rare Replay collection of games. Available via Game Pass.
Jewel Quest	Microsoft Studios	XBLA			November 14, 2017	
Joe Danger 2: The Movie	Microsoft Studios	XBLA			October 20, 2016	
Joe Danger: Special Edition	Microsoft Studios	XBLA			June 23, 2016	
Joust	Warner Bros. Interactive Entertainment	XBLA			August 25, 2016	
Joy Ride Turbo	Microsoft Studios	XBLA			November 12, 2015	Available via Game Pass.
Juju	Nordic Games	XBLA			January 31, 2017	
Jurassic Park: The Game	Telltale Games	Disc Only			October 11, 2016	
Just Cause	Eidos Interactive				October 30, 2018	The original Xbox version is not compatible.
Just Cause 2	Square Enix				November 12, 2015	Also available as a bonus with purchase of successor Just Cause 3.
Kameo	Microsoft Studios		Yes	Yes	November 12, 2015	Available to Xbox One Preview Program Members on June 15, 2015. Also included as part of the Rare Replay collection of games. Available via Game Pass.
Kane & Lynch 2: Dog Days	Square Enix				December 17, 2015	
Killer Is Dead	XSEED Games				October 27, 2016	
A Kingdom for Keflings	Microsoft Studios	XBLA			November 12, 2015	Available to Xbox One Preview Program Members on June 15, 2015.
Kingdoms of Amalur: Reckoning	Electronic Arts	Disc Only			November 29, 2018	Also available as Kingdoms of Amalur: Re-Reckoning for Xbox One.
The King of Fighters '98 Ultimate Match	SNK Playmore	XBLA			March 28, 2016	
The King of Fighters 2002 Unlimited Match	SNK Playmore	XBLA			February 23, 2017	
King of Fighters: Sky Stage	SNK Playmore	XBLA			October 12, 2017	
The King of Fighters XIII	SNK				February 12, 2019	
Lara Croft and the Guardian of Light	Crystal Dynamics	XBLA			February 20, 2018	
Lazy Raiders	Microsoft Studios	XBLA			June 7, 2016	
Left 4 Dead	Valve	Disc Only	Yes		June 16, 2016	
Left 4 Dead 2	Valve	Disc Only	Yes		March 29, 2016	
Lego Batman 2: DC Super Heroes	Warner Bros. Interactive Entertainment				January 31, 2019	
Lego Batman: The Videogame	Warner Bros. Interactive Entertainment				February 11, 2016	Japanese version can only be played off the disc.
Lego Indiana Jones 2: The Adventure Continues	Disney Interactive Studios				January 25, 2018	
Lego Indiana Jones: The Original Adventures	Disney Interactive Studios				February 7, 2017	
Lego The Lord of the Rings	Warner Bros. Interactive Entertainment	Disc Only		Yes	November 15, 2021	
Lego Pirates of the Caribbean: The Video Game	Disney Interactive Studios				November 12, 2015	
Lego Star Wars: The Complete Saga	Disney Interactive Studios				November 12, 2015	
Lego Star Wars II: The Original Trilogy	Disney Interactive Studios				October 23, 2018	
Lego Star Wars III: The Clone Wars	Disney Interactive Studios				March 6, 2018	
Lightning Returns: Final Fantasy XIII	Square Enix		Yes	Yes	November 13, 2018	
Limbo	Microsoft Studios	XBLA (Delisted)			November 3, 2016	Also released on Xbox One.
Lode Runner	Microsoft Studios	XBLA			November 12, 2015	
Lost Odyssey	Microsoft Studios				September 29, 2016	
Lost Planet 2	Capcom				February 21, 2019	
Lost Planet 3	Capcom				February 21, 2019	
Lost Planet: Colonies	Capcom				February 21, 2019	
Lost Planet: Extreme Condition	Capcom	Disc Only			February 21, 2019	
Lumines Live!	Microsoft Studios	XBLA			November 12, 2015	Also available when the Xbox Live Arcade Game Pack disc is inserted.
Luxor 2	Microsoft Studios	XBLA			March 16, 2017	Also available when Xbox Live Arcade Compilation Disc is inserted.
Madballs in Babo: Invasion	Microsoft Studios	XBLA			March 16, 2017	
Mad Tracks	Microsoft Studios	XBLA (Delisted)			January 31, 2017	
Mafia II	2K Games				February 13, 2018	Owners of the Classics Edition can run the game with all the DLC using disc 2. Also available as Mafia II: Definitive Edition for Xbox One.
Magic: The Gathering - Duels of the Planeswalkers	Microsoft Studios	XBLA (Delisted)			January 18, 2018	
Magic: The Gathering - Duels of the Planeswalkers 2012	Microsoft Studios	XBLA (Delisted)			May 24, 2016	
Magic: The Gathering - Duels of the Planeswalkers 2013	Microsoft Studios	XBLA (Delisted)			January 18, 2018	
Magic: The Gathering – Duels of the Planeswalkers 2014	Microsoft Studios	XBLA (Delisted)			January 18, 2018	
Marathon 2: Durandal	Microsoft Studios	XBLA			February 26, 2019	
Marlow Briggs and the Mask of Death	505 Games	XBLA			November 28, 2017	
Mars: War Logs	Focus Home Interactive	XBLA			June 30, 2016	
Mass Effect	Microsoft Studios				November 12, 2015	Available to Xbox One Preview Program Members on June 15, 2015. Available in The Play List on EA Play. Also available in the Mass Effect Legendary Edition collection.
Mass Effect 2	Electronic Arts				November 7, 2016	Available in The Play List on EA Play. Also available in the Mass Effect Legendary Edition collection.
Mass Effect 3	Electronic Arts				November 7, 2016	Available in The Play List on EA Play. Also available in the Mass Effect Legendary Edition collection.
Matt Hazard: Blood Bath and Beyond	D3 Publisher	XBLA			May 23, 2017	
The Maw	Microsoft Studios	XBLA			September 15, 2016	
Max Payne 3	Rockstar Games				November 15, 2021	
Medal of Honor: Airborne	Electronic Arts			Yes	November 29, 2016	Available in The Play List on EA Play.
Meet the Robinsons	Disney Interactive Studios				March 2, 2017	
Mega Man 9	Capcom	XBLA			January 12, 2017	Also available in the Mega Man Legacy Collection 2 for Xbox One.
Mega Man 10	Capcom	XBLA			January 12, 2017	Also available in the Mega Man Legacy Collection 2 for Xbox One.
Metal Gear Rising: Revengeance	Konami				August 15, 2017	
Metal Gear Solid HD Collection	Konami	Disc Only			October 9, 2018	HD versions of Metal Gear Solid 2: Sons of Liberty and Metal Gear Solid 3: Snake Eater can either be bought separately digitally or on the disc for the HD Collection. As of November 2021, digital versions have been temporarily delisted due to expired licenses. Both games were released in the compilation Metal Gear Solid: Master Collection for Xbox Series X/S.
Metal Gear Solid: Peace Walker - HD Edition	Konami				March 13, 2018	Stand-alone disc from the Metal Gear Solid HD Collection is also compatible. Listed as "MGS PW HD" on the Microsoft Store. Searching "Peace Walker" will return no results.
Metal Slug 3	SNK Playmore	XBLA			November 12, 2015	Also released as part of the ACA NeoGeo Series for Xbox One
Metal Slug XX	SNK Playmore	XBLA			November 12, 2015	
Midnight Club: Los Angeles	Rockstar Games				June 7, 2018	The Complete Edition will be downloaded when a physical copy of the standard edition is used.
Midway Arcade Origins	Warner Bros. Interactive Entertainment				January 19, 2017	
Might & Magic: Clash of Heroes	Ubisoft	XBLA			November 12, 2015	
Military Madness: Nectaris	Hudson Soft	XBLA			November 17, 2016	
Mini Ninjas	Square Enix				November 15, 2021	
Mirror's Edge	Electronic Arts		Yes	Yes	November 12, 2015	Available in The Play List on EA Play.
The Misadventures of P.B. Winterbottom	2K Play	XBLA			January 30, 2018	
Missile Command	Atari	XBLA			November 12, 2015	Also available as part of Atari Flashback Classics Volume 2 for Xbox One.
Monaco: What's Yours Is Mine	Majesco	XBLA			April 14, 2016	
Monday Night Combat	Microsoft Studios	XBLA			November 12, 2015	
Monkey Island 2 Special Edition: LeChuck's Revenge	Disney Interactive Studios	XBLA			November 12, 2015	
Monopoly Deal	Ubisoft	XBLA (Delisted)			September 14, 2017	Also released on Xbox One.
Monopoly Plus	Ubisoft	XBLA (Delisted)			June 9, 2016	Also released on Xbox One.
Moon Diver	Square Enix	XBLA			February 23, 2017	
Mortal Kombat	Warner Bros. Interactive Entertainment	Disc Only			November 15, 2021	
Mortal Kombat vs. DC Universe	Midway Games	Disc Only			November 15, 2021	
Motocross Madness	Microsoft Studios	XBLA (Delisted)			December 17, 2015	
Mr. Driller Online	Namco	XBLA (Delisted)			August 2, 2016	
Ms. Pac-Man	Bandai Namco Entertainment	XBLA (Delisted)			December 17, 2015	Also available as part of the Xbox One Arcade Game Series.
Ms. Splosion Man	Microsoft Studios	XBLA			November 12, 2015	
Mutant Storm Empire	Microsoft Studios	XBLA			January 19, 2017	
Mutant Storm Reloaded	Microsoft Studios	XBLA			October 26, 2017	
MX vs. ATV Alive	THQ				November 15, 2021	
MX vs. ATV Reflex	THQ				May 3, 2016	
MX vs. ATV Untamed	THQ				November 15, 2021	
N+	Microsoft Studios	XBLA (Delisted)			November 12, 2015	Available to Xbox One Preview Program Members on June 16, 2015. Can no longer be purchased on Microsoft Store.
NBA Jam: On Fire Edition	Electronic Arts	XBLA (Delisted)			November 12, 2015	
NeoGeo Battle Coliseum	SNK Playmore	XBLA			July 21, 2016	
New Rally-X	Bandai Namco Entertainment	XBLA (Delisted)			August 2, 2016	
Nier	Square Enix			Yes	November 15, 2021	Also available in a remastered version named Nier Replicant ver.1.22474487139... for Xbox One.
Nights into Dreams	Sega	XBLA (Delisted)			November 12, 2015	
Nin2-Jump	CAVE	XBLA			August 2, 2016	
Ninja Gaiden 3: Razor's Edge	Koei Tecmo				May 2, 2019	Also available in the Ninja Gaiden Master Collection for Xbox One.
Ninja Gaiden II	Tecmo		Yes		April 16, 2019	Also available as an enhanced port known as Ninja Gaiden Sigma 2 in the Ninja Gaiden Master Collection for Xbox One.
Novadrome	Microsoft Studios	XBLA			November 15, 2021	
Of Orcs and Men	Focus Home Interactive				September 8, 2016	Only available in some regions.
Omega Five	Hudson Soft	XBLA			November 17, 2016	
Onechanbara: Bikini Samurai Squad	D3 Publisher				November 15, 2021	
Operation Flashpoint: Dragon Rising	Codemasters	Disc Only			November 12, 2015	
Operation Flashpoint: Red River	Codemasters	Disc Only			November 8, 2016	
The Orange Box	Valve	Disc Only	Yes		October 20, 2016	Was available on the Xbox 360 digital store until it was delisted on February 7, 2023.
Orcs Must Die!	Microsoft Studios	XBLA			February 12, 2019	
The Outfit	THQ				November 15, 2021	
Outland	Ubisoft	XBLA			April 6, 2016	
Outpost Kaloki X	Microsoft Studios				November 15, 2021	Available on the Xbox Live Arcade Unplugged disc.
Overlord	Codemasters	Disc Only			July 10, 2018	
Overlord II	Codemasters	Disc Only			July 10, 2018	
Pac-Man	Bandai Namco Entertainment	XBLA			March 17, 2016	Also available as part of the Xbox One Arcade Game Series.
Pac-Man Championship Edition	Bandai Namco Entertainment	XBLA			November 12, 2015	Also available when Xbox Live Arcade Compilation Disc is inserted. Also available in Pac-Man Museum+.
Pac-Man Championship Edition DX	Bandai Namco Entertainment	XBLA			November 12, 2015	
Pac-Man Museum	Bandai Namco Entertainment	XBLA (Delisted)			July 21, 2016	
Peggle	PopCap Games	XBLA			December 17, 2015	Available on the Plants vs Zombies disc. Available in The Play List on EA Play.
Peggle 2	Electronic Arts	XBLA (Delisted)			November 28, 2017	Xbox 360 version is no longer available for purchase. Also released on Xbox One.
Perfect Dark	Microsoft Studios	XBLA	Yes		November 12, 2015	Available to Xbox One Preview Program Members on June 15, 2015. Also included as part of the Rare Replay collection of games. Available via Game Pass.
Perfect Dark Zero	Microsoft Studios		Yes		November 12, 2015	Available to Xbox One Preview Program Members on June 15, 2015. Also included as part of the Rare Replay collection of games. Available via Game Pass.
Persona 4 Arena	Atlus	Disc Only			November 14, 2017	
Peter Jackson's King Kong	Ubisoft	Disc Only			June 10, 2019	
Phantasy Star II	Sega	XBLA			May 5, 2016	Also available in Sega Genesis Classics for Xbox One.
Phantom Breaker: Battle Grounds	Mages	XBLA			November 12, 2015	
Pinball FX	Microsoft Studios	XBLA (Delisted)			November 12, 2015	Can no longer be purchased on Microsoft Store.
Planets Under Attack	Topware Interactive	XBLA			December 15, 2016	
Plants vs. Zombies	PopCap Games	XBLA			November 12, 2015	Available on the Plants vs Zombies disc. Available in The Play List on EA Play.
Port Royale 3: Pirates & Merchants	Kalypso Media				January 31, 2019	
Portal 2	Valve		Yes		June 16, 2016	
Portal: Still Alive	Valve	XBLA	Yes		December 17, 2015	
Prey (2006)	2K Games				February 13, 2018	
Prince of Persia	Ubisoft	Disc Only			August 7, 2018	
Prince of Persia: The Forgotten Sands	Ubisoft				June 10, 2019	
Prince of Persia Classic	Ubisoft	XBLA			November 12, 2015	
Pure	Disney Interactive Studios	Disc Only			November 22, 2016	
Putty Squad	System 3 Software Limited	XBLA			November 12, 2015	
Puzzle Quest 2	D3 Publisher	XBLA			October 4, 2016	
Puzzle Quest: Challenge of the Warlords	D3 Publisher	XBLA			October 13, 2016	
Puzzle Quest: Galactrix	D3 Publisher	XBLA			October 4, 2016	
Puzzlegeddon	Tecmo	XBLA			May 10, 2016	
Qix++	Taito Corporation	XBLA			September 8, 2016	
Quake Arena Arcade	Bethesda Softworks	XBLA			November 15, 2021	
Quantum Conundrum	Square Enix	XBLA			July 18, 2017	
R-Type Dimensions	Microsoft Studios	XBLA			November 12, 2015	
Radiant Silvergun	Microsoft Studios	XBLA			June 27, 2017	
Rage	Bethesda Softworks				October 27, 2016	Available via Game Pass.
Raiden IV	Moss	Disc Only			July 25, 2017	
Raskulls	Microsoft Studios	XBLA			December 15, 2016	
RAW: Realms of Ancient War	Focus Home Interactive	XBLA			November 15, 2021	
Rayman 3 HD	Ubisoft	XBLA			November 12, 2015	
Rayman Legends	Ubisoft				November 22, 2016	Also released on Xbox One
Rayman Origins	Ubisoft				April 21, 2016	
Rayman Raving Rabbids	Ubisoft				January 10, 2019	
Red Dead Redemption	Rockstar Games		Yes		July 8, 2016	Standard, "Game of the Year" and "Undead Nightmare" editions are all compatible.
Red Faction: Armageddon	THQ				July 25, 2017	
Red Faction: Battlegrounds	THQ	XBLA			June 23, 2016	
Resident Evil Code: Veronica X	Capcom	XBLA			February 21, 2019	
Resident Evil: Operation Raccoon City	Capcom			Yes	November 15, 2021	
Ridge Racer 6	Namco				November 15, 2021	Digital version can only be bought in US Store. Other regions have to use a physical disc to play the game or change console to USA region and purchase with USA gift cards.
Rio	THQ	Disc Only			November 15, 2021	
Risen	Deep Silver				November 15, 2021	
Risen 2: Dark Waters	Deep Silver				November 15, 2021	
RoboBlitz	Microsoft Studios	XBLA			April 20, 2017	
Rock of Ages	Atlus	XBLA		Yes	November 15, 2021	
Rocket Knight	Konami	XBLA			January 26, 2017	
Rockstar Games Presents Table Tennis	Rockstar Games				June 7, 2018	
R.U.S.E.	Ubisoft	Disc Only			July 17, 2018	
Rumble Roses XX	Konami				September 11, 2018	
Runner2	Aksys Games	XBLA			May 5, 2016	
Sacred 2: Fallen Angel	Deep Silver				November 15, 2021	
Sacred 3	Deep Silver				December 16, 2015	
Sacred Citadel	Deep Silver	XBLA			November 12, 2015	
Saints Row	Koch Media				May 29, 2018	
Saints Row 2	Koch Media				May 1, 2018	
Saints Row: Gat out of Hell	Deep Silver				May 29, 2018	Also released on Xbox One.
Saints Row: The Third	Koch Media				September 14, 2017	Also released as Saints Row: The Third Remastered for Xbox One and Series X/S.
Saints Row IV	Deep Silver				March 31, 2016	Also released on Xbox One.
Sam & Max Beyond Time and Space	Microsoft Studios	XBLA			February 11, 2016	Also available as a remastered version on Xbox One.
Sam & Max Save the World	Microsoft Studios	XBLA			January 21, 2016	Also available as a remastered version on Xbox One.
Samurai Shodown II	SNK Playmore	XBLA			May 5, 2016	Also released as part of the ACA NeoGeo Series for Xbox One
Scarygirl	Square Enix	XBLA			November 10, 2016	
Scramble	Konami	XBLA			November 15, 2021	
Scrap Metal	Microsoft Studios	XBLA			January 10, 2017	
Screamride	Microsoft Studios				August 15, 2017	Also released on Xbox One
Screwjumper!	THQ	XBLA (Delisted)			November 15, 2021	
The Secret of Monkey Island: Special Edition	Disney Interactive Studios	XBLA			November 12, 2015	
Sega Bass Fishing	Sega	XBLA (Delisted)			June 9, 2016	Also available when the Dreamcast Collection disc is inserted.
Sega Vintage Collection: Alex Kidd & Co. (Alex Kidd in Miracle World, Super Hang-On, The Revenge of Shinobi)	Sega	XBLA (Delisted)			November 12, 2015	The Revenge of Shinobi also available in Sega Genesis Classics for Xbox One.
Sega Vintage Collection: Golden Axe (Golden Axe, II, III)	Sega	XBLA (Delisted)			November 12, 2015	II and III are also available in Sega Genesis Classics for Xbox One.
Sega Vintage Collection: Monster World (Wonder Boy in Monster Land, Wonder Boy in Monster World, Monster World IV)	Sega	XBLA (Delisted)			November 12, 2015	Wonder Boy in Monster World also available in Sega Genesis Classics for Xbox One.
Sega Vintage Collection: Streets of Rage (Streets of Rage, 2, 3)	Sega	XBLA (Delisted)			November 12, 2015	Can be set to Japanese regardless of region. Available to Xbox One Preview Program Members on October 27, 2015. Games are also available in Sega Genesis Classics for Xbox One.
Sega Vintage Collection: ToeJam & Earl (ToeJam & Earl and ToeJam & Earl in Panic on Funkotron)	Sega	XBLA (Delisted)			August 3, 2017	Games are also available in Sega Genesis Classics for Xbox One.
Sensible World of Soccer	Codemasters	XBLA			June 26, 2018	
Shadow Assault: Tenchu	From Software	XBLA			May 23, 2017	
Shadow Complex	Microsoft Studios	XBLA			November 12, 2015	Available to Xbox One Preview Program Members on August 3, 2015. Also available in a remastered version for Xbox One.
Shadowrun	Microsoft Studios				December 8, 2016	
Shadows of the Damned	Electronic Arts	Disc Only			January 26, 2017	
Shank 2	Electronic Arts	XBLA			August 11, 2016	
Shinobi	Sega	XBLA			May 23, 2017	
Shotest Shogi	Microsoft Studios	XBLA			December 8, 2016	
Shred Nebula	Microsoft Studios	XBLA			October 27, 2016	
Sid Meier's Civilization Revolution	2K Games		Yes		April 4, 2017	
Silent Hill: Downpour	Konami	Disc Only			October 13, 2016	
Silent Hill: Homecoming	Konami				July 24, 2018	
Silent Hill HD Collection	Konami				July 24, 2018	Includes remastered versions of Silent Hill 2 & Silent Hill 3.
Sine Mora	Nordic Games	XBLA			August 7, 2018	Also available as Sine Mora EX for Xbox One.
Skate	Electronic Arts				June 10, 2019	Available in The Play List on EA Play.
Skate 2	Electronic Arts	Disc Only			November 15, 2021	
Skate 3	Electronic Arts		Yes		November 10, 2016	Available in The Play List on EA Play.
Skullgirls: Encore	MarvelousAQL	XBLA			January 21, 2016	
Skydive: Proximity Flight	TopWare Interactive	XBLA			December 15, 2016	
Slender: The Arrival	Midnight City	XBLA			September 14, 2017	Also released on Xbox One
Small Arms	Microsoft Studios	XBLA			January 21, 2016	
Sniper Elite V2	505 Games				January 16, 2018	Also available as Sniper Elite V2 Remastered for Xbox One.
Soltrio Solitaire	Xbox Game Studios	XBLA			March 28, 2017	
Sonic & All-Stars Racing Transformed	Sega			Yes	October 4, 2016	
Sonic & Knuckles	Sega	XBLA (Delisted)			May 5, 2016	Supports Sonic 3 & Knuckles for those that also owned Sonic 3. Also available as a remastered version in the Sonic Origins compilation for Xbox One and Series X/S. Can no longer be purchased on Microsoft Store.
Sonic Adventure	Sega	XBLA			September 28, 2017	Also available when the Dreamcast Collection disc is inserted. Also included in the Sonic the Hedgehog Legacy Bundle.
Sonic Adventure 2	Sega	XBLA			November 30, 2017	Also included in the Sonic the Hedgehog Legacy Bundle.
Sonic CD	Sega	XBLA (Delisted)			November 12, 2015	Also available in the Sonic Origins compilation for Xbox One and Series X/S. Can no longer be purchased on Microsoft Store.
Sonic Generations	Sega		Yes	Yes	April 10, 2018	Also available as a remastered version on Xbox One and Series X/S in Sonic X Shadow Generations. Can only be digitally purchased as part of the Sonic the Hedgehog Legacy Bundle. No longer available for separate purchase as of 2024.
Sonic the Fighters	Sega	XBLA			April 12, 2016	Also included in the Sonic the Hedgehog Legacy Bundle. No longer available for separate purchase as of 2024.
Sonic the Hedgehog	Sega	XBLA (Delisted)			November 12, 2015	Supports Blue Sphere for those that also owned Sonic & Knuckles. Also available in Sega Genesis Classics and as a remastered version in the Sonic Origins compilation for Xbox One and Series X/S. Can no longer be purchased on Microsoft Store.
Sonic the Hedgehog 2	Sega	XBLA (Delisted)			November 12, 2015	Supports Knuckles in Sonic 2 for those that also own Sonic & Knuckles. Also available in Sega Genesis Classics and as a remastered version in the Sonic Origins compilation for Xbox One and Series X/S. Can no longer be purchased on Microsoft Store.
Sonic the Hedgehog 3	Sega	XBLA (Delisted)			November 12, 2015	Supports Sonic 3 & Knuckles for those that also owned Sonic & Knuckles. Also available as a remastered version in the Sonic Origins compilation for Xbox One and Series X/S. Can no longer be purchased on Microsoft Store.
Sonic the Hedgehog 4: Episode I	Sega	XBLA			July 21, 2016	Also included in the Sonic the Hedgehog Legacy Bundle.
Sonic the Hedgehog 4: Episode II	Sega	XBLA			July 21, 2016	Also included in the Sonic the Hedgehog Legacy Bundle.
Sonic Unleashed	Sega			Yes	November 29, 2018	
Soulcalibur	Namco	XBLA (Delisted)			January 21, 2016	Can no longer be purchased on Microsoft Store.
SoulCalibur II HD Online	Namco Bandai Games	XBLA (Delisted)			March 28, 2016	Can no longer be purchased on Microsoft Store.
South Park: The Stick of Truth	Ubisoft	Disc Only			November 12, 2015	Also released on Xbox One.
Space Ark	Microsoft Studios	XBLA			December 8, 2016	
Space Giraffe	Microsoft Studios	XBLA			January 21, 2016	
Space Invaders Infinity Gene	Square Enix	XBLA			February 23, 2017	
Spec Ops: The Line	2K Games	Disc Only			January 30, 2018	
Spelunky	Microsoft Studios	XBLA (Delisted)			December 17, 2015	
The Splatters	Microsoft Studios	XBLA			January 10, 2017	
Split/Second	Disney Interactive Studios				January 25, 2018	
'Splosion Man	Microsoft Studios	XBLA			December 17, 2015	
SpongeBob's Truth or Square	THQ				November 15, 2021	
SpongeBob SquarePants: Underpants Slam	THQ	XBLA			November 15, 2021	
SSX	EA Sports				May 26, 2016	Available in The Play List on EA Play.
Stacking	THQ	XBLA			March 21, 2017	Available via Game Pass.
Star Ocean: The Last Hope	Square Enix				June 10, 2019	
Star Wars: The Force Unleashed	Disney Interactive Studios		Yes		May 4, 2016	The Ultimate Sith Edition comes with 2 discs, both being separately backwards compatible. Disc one is the base game, disc two includes DLC.
Star Wars: The Force Unleashed II	Disney Interactive Studios				May 4, 2016	
Steins;Gate	Mages				May 18, 2017	Japan only.
Steins;Gate: Hiyoku Renri no Darling	Mages				May 18, 2017	Japan only.
Steins;Gate: Senkei Kōsoku no Phenogram	Mages				May 18, 2017	Japan only.
Strania	G.rev	XBLA			January 10, 2017	
Street Fighter IV	Capcom				March 16, 2017	
Stuntman: Ignition	THQ				January 31, 2017	
Super Contra	Konami	XBLA			September 14, 2017	Also included in Contra Anniversary Collection for Xbox One. Also Available if the Konami Classics Vol. 1 disc is inserted.
Super Meat Boy	Microsoft Studios	XBLA			November 12, 2015	Available to Xbox One Preview Program Members on June 15, 2015.
Super Puzzle Fighter II Turbo HD Remix	Capcom	XBLA			June 10, 2019	Digital only, physical version not supported.
Super Street Fighter IV	Capcom	Disc Only			July 13, 2017	
Super Street Fighter IV: Arcade Edition	Capcom				July 13, 2017	
Supreme Commander 2	Square Enix				November 12, 2015	
Switchball	Activision	XBLA			November 15, 2021	
Syberia	Bandai Namco Games	XBLA (Delisted)			July 26, 2016	
Syndicate	Electronic Arts	Disc Only			June 10, 2019	
Tales from Space: Mutant Blobs Attack	Midnight City	XBLA (Delisted)			November 12, 2015	
Tecmo Bowl Throwback	Tecmo Koei	XBLA			November 14, 2017	
Tekken 6	Namco Bandai Games				January 19, 2017	Also available as a bonus with purchase of Tekken 7.
Tekken Tag Tournament 2	Bandai Namco Entertainment				March 23, 2016	
Texas Hold 'Em	Microsoft Studios	XBLA			May 3, 2016	Available on the Xbox Live Arcade Unplugged disc.
Thrillville: Off the Rails	Disney Interactive Studios				November 15, 2021	
Ticket to Ride	Microsoft Studios	XBLA			December 17, 2015	Also released on Xbox One.
Time Pilot	Konami	XBLA			November 15, 2021	
TimeShift	Vivendi Universal Games				April 25, 2017	
Tom Clancy's EndWar	Ubisoft				November 6, 2018	
Tom Clancy's Ghost Recon Advanced Warfighter	Ubisoft				July 3, 2018	
Tom Clancy's Ghost Recon Advanced Warfighter 2	Ubisoft				March 26, 2019	
Tom Clancy's Ghost Recon: Future Soldier	Ubisoft				March 13, 2018	
Tom Clancy's H.A.W.X	Ubisoft	Disc Only			November 6, 2018	
Tom Clancy's Rainbow Six: Vegas	Ubisoft				November 12, 2015	It was also available as a bonus with purchase of Tom Clancy's Rainbow Six Siege until 2017.
Tom Clancy's Rainbow Six: Vegas 2	Ubisoft				November 12, 2015	It was also available as a bonus with purchase of Tom Clancy's Rainbow Six Siege until 2017.
Tom Clancy's Splinter Cell: Blacklist	Ubisoft		Yes		July 31, 2018	
Tom Clancy's Splinter Cell: Conviction	Ubisoft		Yes		February 8, 2018	
Tom Clancy's Splinter Cell: Double Agent	Ubisoft		Yes		July 31, 2018	
Tomb Raider: Anniversary	Crystal Dynamics				August 14, 2018	
Tomb Raider: Legend	Crystal Dynamics				August 14, 2018	
Tomb Raider: Underworld	Crystal Dynamics				July 27, 2017	
Too Human	Microsoft Studios				June 10, 2019	
Torchlight	Microsoft Studios	XBLA			November 12, 2015	
Tour de France 2009: The Official Game	Focus Home Interactive	XBLA (Delisted)			July 19, 2016	
Tour de France 2011	Focus Home Interactive	XBLA (Delisted)			October 11, 2016	
Tower Bloxx Deluxe	Microsoft Studios	XBLA			March 21, 2017	
Toy Soldiers	Microsoft Studios	XBLA (Delisted)			November 12, 2015	Available to Xbox One Preview Program Members on June 15, 2015. Also available as a remastered version on Xbox One.
Toy Soldiers: Cold War	Microsoft Studios	XBLA (Delisted)			November 12, 2015	Available to Xbox One Preview Program Members on June 15, 2015.
Toy Story 3	Disney Interactive Studios	Disc Only			September 29, 2016	Can no longer be purchased on Microsoft Store. Available as Toy Story 3: Complete Edition on Xbox One and Series X/S.
Toy Story Mania!	Disney Interactive Studios				November 15, 2021	
Toybox Turbos	Codemasters	Disc Only			May 29, 2018	
Trials Evolution	Microsoft Studios	XBLA (Delisted)			May 2, 2019	Can no longer be purchased on Microsoft Store.
Trials HD	Microsoft Studios	XBLA			February 11, 2016	
Triggerheart Exelica	Microsoft Studios	XBLA			July 28, 2016	
Trine 2	Atlus	XBLA (Delisted)			November 29, 2016	Also released on Xbox One.
Tron: Evolution	Disney Interactive Studios				November 12, 2015	
Tropico 4	Kalypso Media				October 23, 2018	
Ugly Americans: Apocalypsegeddon	345 Games; Comedy Central	XBLA			November 12, 2015	
Ultra Street Fighter IV	Capcom	Disc Only			July 13, 2017	
Unbound Saga	Microsoft Studios	XBLA			May 24, 2016	
Undertow	Microsoft Studios	XBLA			September 14, 2017	
Unreal Tournament 3	Midway Games				June 10, 2019	
Vandal Hearts: Flames of Judgment	Konami	XBLA		Yes	November 15, 2021	
Vanquish	Sega				February 20, 2018	Also available as a remastered version on Xbox One.
Virtua Fighter 2	Sega	XBLA (Delisted)			July 18, 2017	
Virtua Fighter 5: Final Showdown	Sega	XBLA			September 15, 2016	
Cyber Troopers Virtual-On	Sega	XBLA			September 14, 2017	Japan only.
Viva Piñata	Microsoft Studios		Yes		November 12, 2015	Available to Xbox One Preview Program Members on June 15, 2015. Also included as part of the Rare Replay collection of games. Available via Game Pass.
Viva Piñata: Party Animals	Microsoft Studios				November 15, 2021	
Viva Piñata: Trouble in Paradise	Microsoft Studios		Yes		November 12, 2015	Available to Xbox One Preview Program Members on June 15, 2015. Also included as part of the Rare Replay collection of games. Available via Game Pass.
The Walking Dead	Telltale Games				August 29, 2017	Also released on Xbox One.
The Walking Dead: Michonne	Telltale Games	XBLA			August 29, 2017	Also released on Xbox One.
The Walking Dead: Season Two	Telltale Games				August 29, 2017	Also released on Xbox One.
Warlords	Atari	XBLA			November 15, 2021	Also available as part of Atari Flashback Classics Volume 1 for Xbox One.
The Witcher 2: Assassins of Kings	CD Projekt Red		Yes		January 21, 2016	
Wolf of the Battlefield: Commando 3	Capcom	XBLA			June 27, 2017	
Wolfenstein 3D	Bethesda Softworks	XBLA			November 12, 2015	Available via Game Pass.
Word Puzzle	Microsoft Studios	XBLA			September 20, 2016	
A World of Keflings	Microsoft Studios	XBLA			November 12, 2015	Available to Xbox One Preview Program Members on June 15, 2015.
XCOM: Enemy Unknown	2K Games				May 24, 2016	
XCOM: Enemy Within	2K Games				June 9, 2016	
Yosumin! Live	Square Enix	XBLA			October 26, 2017	
Zone of the Enders HD Collection	Konami				September 11, 2018	Includes remastered versions of Zone of the Enders & Zone of the Enders: The 2nd Runner.
Zuma	Electronic Arts	XBLA			November 12, 2015	Available to Xbox One Preview Program Members on June 16, 2015. Available in The Play List on EA Play. Available on the Plants vs Zombies disc.
Zuma's Revenge!	PopCap Games	XBLA			December 17, 2015	Available in The Play List on EA Play.

== List of compatible titles from Xbox ==
There are currently 63 on this list out of 989 released for the Xbox. Games removed from store can still be played if a disc copy is owned or downloaded prior to removal. All original Xbox games run at four times the original resolution on Xbox One and Xbox One S consoles (up to 960p), nine times on Xbox Series S (up to 1440p), and sixteen times on Xbox One X and Xbox Series X (up to 1920p). Certain games also benefit from Auto HDR and FPS Boost on Series X/S. The games listed as available on PC can be played only with a digitally purchased copy of the game on Microsoft Store or via Game Pass, since physical discs are not supported; furthermore, they are all part of the Xbox Play Anywhere feature.

compatible titles from Xbox
Title	Publisher(s)	FPS Boost	Available on PC	Date added	Notes	Ref.
Advent Rising	Ziggurat Interactive			November 15, 2021		
Armed and Dangerous	LucasArts		Yes	June 10, 2019	Removed from store. Includes all DLC.	
Battlefield 2: Modern Combat	Electronic Arts			June 10, 2019	Not backwards compatible: Inserting the Xbox disc will download Xbox 360 version of the game.	
Black	Electronic Arts			October 24, 2017	Available in The Play List on EA Play.	
Blinx: The Time Sweeper	Microsoft Studios		Yes	April 17, 2018	Also available via Game Pass.	
BloodRayne 2	Majesco			October 24, 2017	Also available as a remastered version for Xbox One and Series X/S.	
Breakdown	Bandai Namco Entertainment			April 17, 2018		
Chicken Little	Disney Interactive Studios	Yes	Yes	November 15, 2021		
Conker: Live & Reloaded	Microsoft Studios		Yes	April 17, 2018	Also available via Game Pass.	
Crimson Skies: High Road to Revenge	Microsoft Studios		Yes	October 24, 2017	Also available via Game Pass.	
Dead or Alive 3	Tecmo			November 15, 2021	The European and Japanese versions, which feature more content, can be downloaded from Microsoft Store on American platforms by purchasing Dead or Alive 3 for $14.99 in Microsoft Store first, then changing the region in the Xbox settings to either United Kingdom or Japan, and restarting the console before downloading. The console can be switched back to the American region after the download is complete.	
Dead or Alive Ultimate	Tecmo			November 15, 2021	Listed and considered as two separate games in Microsoft Store: "Dead or Alive 1 Ultimate" and "Dead or Alive 2 Ultimate" and will appear as separate in player's library. Searching "Dead or Alive Ultimate" will return no results in store. Owning a copy of Dead or Alive 3 makes the character, Hitomi, playable in Dead or Alive 2 Ultimate.	
Dead to Rights	Bandai Namco Entertainment			October 24, 2017	Digital version can only be bought on the US Store. Users in other regions must use a physical disc to play the game, or change their console's region to purchase on the USA store.	
Destroy All Humans!	THQ Nordic			April 26, 2018		
The Elder Scrolls III: Morrowind	Bethesda Softworks		Yes	April 17, 2018	Includes Tribunal and Bloodmoon expansions. Available via Game Pass.	
Full Spectrum Warrior	THQ Nordic			April 26, 2018		
Fuzion Frenzy	Microsoft Studios		Yes	October 24, 2017	Also available via Game Pass.	
Gladius	LucasArts			November 15, 2021		
Grabbed by the Ghoulies	Microsoft Studios		Yes	October 24, 2017	Also included in Rare Replay. Available via Game Pass.	
Grand Theft Auto: San Andreas	Rockstar Games			June 7, 2018	Not backwards compatible: inserting the disc downloads the 2014 Xbox 360 remaster version.	
Gunvalkyrie	Sega			November 15, 2021		
Hunter: The Reckoning	Interplay Entertainment			April 17, 2018	At least some disc versions aren't backwards compatible. No comments from Microsoft on this issue.	
Indiana Jones and the Emperor's Tomb	LucasArts		Yes	June 10, 2019	Removed from store.	
Jade Empire	Microsoft Studios			April 17, 2018	Runs at 60 FPS. Limited Edition content is not included.	
The King of Fighters Neowave	SNK			October 24, 2017	Digital version can only be bought on the US Store. Users in other regions must use a physical disc to play the game, or change their console's region to purchase on the USA store.	
Manhunt	Rockstar Games			November 15, 2021		
Max Payne	Rockstar Games			November 15, 2021		
Max Payne 2: The Fall of Max Payne	Rockstar Games			November 15, 2021		
Mercenaries: Playground of Destruction	LucasArts			April 26, 2018		
MX Unleashed	THQ Nordic			April 26, 2018		
Ninja Gaiden Black	Tecmo			October 24, 2017	Original Ninja Gaiden disc is not compatible.	
Oddworld: Munch's Oddysee	Xbox Game Studios			November 15, 2021		
Otogi: Myth of Demons	Sega			November 15, 2021		
Otogi 2: Immortal Warriors	Sega			November 15, 2021		
Panzer Dragoon Orta	Sega			April 17, 2018		
Panzer Elite Action: Fields of Glory	JoWooD Productions			April 26, 2018	Europe only; not released in North America. Can be bought if the console's region is changed to access a storefront where it's available.	
Prince of Persia: The Sands of Time	Ubisoft			October 24, 2017	Removed from store.	
Psychonauts	Double Fine Productions			October 24, 2017	Available via Game Pass.	
Red Dead Revolver	Rockstar Games			November 15, 2021		
Red Faction II	THQ Nordic		Yes	October 24, 2017		
Secret Weapons Over Normandy	LucasArts		Yes	November 15, 2021		
Sid Meier's Pirates!	2K Games			October 24, 2017		
Sphinx and the Cursed Mummy	THQ Nordic			June 10, 2019	Removed from store.	
SSX 3	Electronic Arts			April 17, 2018		
Star Wars: Battlefront	LucasArts		Yes	April 26, 2018	Includes all DLC. Also included in Star Wars: Battlefront Classic Collection.	
Star Wars: Battlefront II	LucasArts		Yes	April 26, 2018	Includes all DLC. Also included in Star Wars: Battlefront Classic Collection.	
Star Wars: The Clone Wars	LucasArts	Yes	Yes	November 15, 2021	Can be installed and played using a Star Wars: The Clone Wars/Tetris Worlds dual game disk.	
Star Wars: Episode III – Revenge of the Sith	LucasArts		Yes	November 15, 2021		
Star Wars Jedi Knight II: Jedi Outcast	LucasArts		Yes	November 15, 2021		
Star Wars Jedi Knight: Jedi Academy	LucasArts		Yes	April 26, 2018		
Star Wars: Jedi Starfighter	LucasArts		Yes	April 26, 2018		
Star Wars: Knights of the Old Republic	LucasArts		Yes	October 24, 2017	Runs at 60 FPS. Includes all DLC.	
Star Wars Knights of the Old Republic II: The Sith Lords	LucasArts		Yes	April 26, 2018		
Star Wars: Republic Commando	LucasArts		Yes	April 26, 2018	Includes all DLC.	
Star Wars: Starfighter Special Edition	LucasArts		Yes	November 15, 2021		
Thrillville	LucasArts		Yes	November 15, 2021		
TimeSplitters 2	Deep Silver		Yes	November 15, 2021		
TimeSplitters: Future Perfect	Deep Silver		Yes	November 15, 2021		
Tom Clancy's Splinter Cell	Ubisoft			June 10, 2019	Removed from store. Includes all DLC.	
Tom Clancy's Splinter Cell: Chaos Theory	Ubisoft			June 10, 2019	Includes all DLC.	
Tom Clancy's Splinter Cell: Double Agent	Ubisoft			June 10, 2019	Removed from store. The Xbox 360 version is available.	
Tom Clancy's Splinter Cell: Pandora Tomorrow	Ubisoft			June 10, 2019	Removed from store. Includes all DLC.	
Unreal Championship 2: The Liandri Conflict	Epic Games			June 10, 2019	Removed from store.	

== See also ==
- Xbox One system software
- List of Xbox games compatible with Xbox 360
