= Xbox Avatar =

Representation of users of the Xbox network service

Line up of various Xbox Avatars from the Xbox 360 era

Xbox Avatars are avatars and characters that represent users of the Xbox network (formerly Xbox Live) on the Xbox 360, Xbox One, and Xbox Series X and Series S video game consoles, Windows 10, and Windows 10 Mobile.

Avatars originally debuted on the Xbox 360 as part of the "New Xbox Experience" system update released on November 19, 2008, updated on Xbox One with "New Xbox One Experience" Xbox One System Software on November 12, 2015, and reimagined with the release of the next generation character for Xbox One on October 11, 2018. They competed primarily with Nintendo's Mii avatars.

== History of Xbox Original Avatar ==
Xbox Original Avatars
- Developers: Microsoft Corporation; Rare
- Release: November 19, 2008 (Xbox 360); November 12, 2015 (Xbox One, Windows 10)

Final release(s)
- Xbox One, Windows 10: 100.1804.3001.0 / April 2018; 8 years ago
- Platform: Xbox (360 and later); Windows (10 and later); Windows 10 Mobile; HoloLens
- Type: Avatar

Xbox 360 users are able to customize body shape, sex, facial features, hair style, clothing, and "props". They can then display a 2D picture of their Avatar on their Gamercard (although they are still free to use their previous picture should they so choose).

Xbox Live GM Ben Kilgore stated in 2008 that Avatars will only be available for games that have an E10+ rating or lower only (featuring content that is considered suitable for children under 10 years of age). This may change sometime in the future, though presumably in Microsoft's own games if it ever happens, to monitor their usage in mature games. It was announced at Game Developers Conference on March 24, 2009, that the XNA framework 3.1 would have an API to support Avatars in indie games. With the release of Windows 10 and the New Xbox One Experience, the rendering of the Avatars has been changed to offer a higher quality of rendering across different devices.

Users can edit their current avatar using the Xbox Original Avatars application on an Xbox console, Windows 10 or Windows 10 Mobile device or by using the Microsoft Silverlight based editor on Xbox.com. Across all of these experiences, users will have access to their entire closet of items that they've purchased or have been awarded throughout the Xbox ecosystem.

The Original Avatar Store was shut down on July 29, 2024.

== The "Next generation" Avatar ==
Xbox Avatar Editor
- Developer: Microsoft Corporation
- Release: October 11, 2018; 8 years ago

Final release(s)
- Xbox One, Windows 10: 100.2004.21002.70 / April 2020; 6 years ago
- Engine: Unity
- Platform: Xbox (One and later); Windows (10 and later); HoloLens
- Type: Avatar

Lineup of various Xbox Avatar characters from Xbox One

On June 13, 2017, during E3 2017, Microsoft announced a complete overhaul of the Avatars, providing a much greater emphasis of customization and inclusiveness, especially by adding limb customization, clothing that supported all characters – as the old system had different clothing for male and female body types – and support for changing asset color at runtime. Other customization includes cloth and hair that are impacted by physics, fourteen different body types with 20 height options, and Moods and Props that are never "put away" when displaying an Avatar. The new Avatar system was delayed originally slated to release in the Fall 2017 but continued to be active in development through 2018. On June 18, 2018, the Xbox Avatar Editor beta – leveraging the Unity engine – arrived to Xbox Insiders, then on August 8, Microsoft released a Q&A on some of the ways how the new Avatars will be displayed on the Xbox One Dashboard, and as of August 16, the new Avatar Xbox Editor beta arrived for Windows 10 testers. and were officially released for all Xbox Live users on October 11, 2018.

For users that have content from their Xbox 360 account, while the new character cannot support the past generation's assets, a backward compatibility mode is available for customers that want to use their existing content. By selecting "Xbox Original Avatar" from the main menu of the Editor, customers can import their entire Xbox 360-era character and use that to represent themselves across the Xbox One Dashboard. Users can continue to leverage their entire Xbox Original Avatar closet using the original app and importing their changes using the Editor, when they want to share a change.

As of the 1811 release, the Xbox Avatar Editor's built-in Closet includes 566 items enabling 142.67 x 10^33 different characters for customers creating an Avatar, which does not take color changing options into account. There is also an Xbox Avatar Store that allows customers to browse and try on new items as they are released to the public.

On November 22, 2024, Microsoft announced that the "Next generation" Avatar Editor would be discontinued on January 9, 2025 due to "low engagement with the program." Avatar purchases made between November 1, 2023 to January 9, 2025 will be automatically refunded. The Xbox Original Avatar Editor will not be affected and will remain available, although the Original Avatar Store was previously shut down on July 29, 2024.

== List of Xbox 360 games using Xbox Original Avatars ==
This is a list of games on the Xbox 360 video game console (both retail and Xbox Live Arcade games) that use Avatars. Some games (marked with an asterisk) get updated to support Avatars when the user updates to the New Xbox Experience dashboard. The player must be signed into Xbox Live to receive the game update for those games. There are no Xbox One games that support Avatars, although some Xbox 360 games that did support them were made backwards compatible for the Xbox One.

– This color indicates that the game is no longer available for download.
– This color indicates Xbox 360 games that are compatible with Xbox One.

Title	Developer	Publisher	Genre
1 vs. 100	Microsoft	Microsoft Game Studios	Game show
A Kingdom for Keflings	NinjaBee	NinjaBee	Strategy game
A World of Keflings	NinjaBee	NinjaBee	Strategy game
Age of Booty	Certain Affinity	Capcom	Real-time strategy
Baby Maker Extreme	Stegersaurus Games	Microsoft Game Studios	Puzzle
Band Hero	Neversoft	Activision	Music
Band of Bugs	NinjaBee	NinjaBee	Turn-based tactics
Blur	Activision	Activision	Racing
Bomberman Live*	Backbone Entertainment	Hudson Soft	Puzzle
Brain Challenge*	Gameloft	Gameloft	Puzzle
Bust-a-Move Live!	Taito	Taito	Puzzle
Colin McRae: Dirt 2	Codemasters	Codemasters	Racing
CastleMiner	DigitalDNA Games	DigitalDNA Games	Sandbox game
CastleMiner Z	DigitalDNA Games	DigitalDNA Games	Survival
CastleMiner Warfare	DigitalDNA Games	DigitalDNA Games	Shooter
Dirt 3	Codemasters	Codemasters	Racing
DJ Hero 2	FreeStyleGames	Activision	Music
Doritos Crash Course	Wanako Games/Behaviour Interactive	Microsoft Game Studios	Platform game
Doritos Crash Course 2	Behaviour Santiago	Microsoft Game Studios	Platform game
F1 Race Stars	Codemasters	Microsoft Game Studios	Racing game
Full House Poker	Microsoft	Microsoft Game Studios	Card game
Guitar Hero 5	Neversoft	Activision	Music
Guitar Hero: Warriors of Rock	Neversoft	Activision	Music
Hardwood Hearts*	Silver Creek Entertainment	Silver Creek Entertainment	Card game
Hardwood Spades*	Silver Creek Entertainment	Silver Creek Entertainment	Card game
Hasbro Family Game Night 2	EA Bright Light	Electronic Arts	Family games
Hasbro Family Game Night 3	EA Bright Light	Electronic Arts	Family games
Hasbro Family Game Night 4: The Game Show	Wahoo Studios	Electronic Arts	Family games
Kinect Joy Ride	BigPark	Microsoft Game Studios	Racing
Kinect Sports	Rare	Microsoft Game Studios	Sports
Kinect Sports: Season Two	Rare/BigPark	Microsoft Studios	Sports
Lazy Raiders	Sarbakan	Microsoft Game Studios	Action/Puzzle
Lips: Number One Hits	iNiS	Microsoft Game Studios	Karaoke
Madballs in Babo: Invasion	Playbrains	Microsoft Game Studios	Top-down shooter
Motocross Madness	Bongfish	Microsoft Game Studios	Racing game
The Path of Go	Microsoft	Microsoft Game Studios	Strategy game
Rainbow Islands: Towering Adventure!	Taito	Taito/Square Enix	Platform game
Scene It? Box Office Smash	Krome Studios/Screenlife Games	Microsoft Game Studios	Game show
Small Arms*	Gastronaut Studios	Microsoft Game Studios	Fighting game
Snoopy Flying Ace	Smart Bomb Interactive	Microsoft Game Studios	Action, Arcade flight
Sonic & Sega All-Stars Racing	Sumo Digital	Sega	Racing
Sonic & All-Stars Racing Transformed	Sumo Digital	Sega	Racing
Sonic Free Riders	Sonic Team	Sega	Racing
Texas Cheat 'em!	Wideload Games	D3 Publisher	Card game
Tony Hawk's Pro Skater HD	Robomodo	Activision	Sports
Uno*	Carbonated Games	Microsoft Game Studios	Card game
Uno Rush	Carbonated Games	Microsoft Game Studios	Card game
Wipeout in the Zone	Behaviour Santiago	Activision	Sports game
World Series of Poker: Full House Pro	Pipeworks Software	Microsoft Game Studios	Card game
Worms 2: Armageddon	Team17	Team17	Strategy game

== Xbox Original Avatar Store ==
The Avatar Store was launched as "Avatar Marketplace" on August 11, 2009, allowing users to buy clothes and props using their Xbox Live account. Users are able to buy branded clothing, such as Adidas, for their Avatar, as well as game-related clothing, such as costumes from Monkey Island, BioShock 2, Battleblock Theater, Fable 2, Gears of War 2, Halo, Splinter Cell Conviction and Star Wars: The Clone Wars. A player can also update their Avatar's wardrobe by achieving certain goals and unlocking different clothing. New clothes and items are added to the Avatar Marketplace every Thursday.

As of late June 2009, various themed clothing articles were spotted in use by various members of the Xbox 360 community – namely those who work for Microsoft. These articles in question were based mainly around Halo, various T-shirts, shorts, hats and even full-body suit costumes were seen not only being worn by current Avatars but also in Avatar Store demonstration pictures and videos. The people who had access to these also were spotted to have a mysterious achievement in their profile named 'Xbox 360 Beta' and was orange in color with a Beta symbol and the number 09 – it was concluded that they were actually beta testing the new Avatar Marketplace. Most recently, Xbox users that were a part of the Xbox Preview Program were given a special prop featuring a cat dressed like a ninja and riding a T-Rex for use with their Xbox Avatar.

In addition to clothing, the Avatar Store also has animated props available for purchase. Avatars can interact with these props, which include a remote control vibrating Warthogs from Halo, Lightsabers from Star Wars, footballs, skateboards, pets, and even pom-poms. According to Major Nelson (Director of Programming for the Microsoft gaming network Xbox Live), those who attended the Electronic Entertainment Expo in 2009 were eligible for a special E3 Trophy prop when the Avatar Marketplace actually hits – however to be in with a chance you had to have visited a special stand that was present at the conference. Most recently, Xbox users that participated in the Xbox One Preview Program were given a specially created prop that showcased a cat dressed as a ninja riding a T-Rex that they could equip to their Xbox Avatar.

Starting with the 1511 release of Windows 10 and New Xbox One Experience the Avatar Store has returned to the Xbox Avatars application, allow users to browse new clothing and props in real time. Purchases made from the latest version of the Avatar Store will work on every Xbox experience including Xbox 360.

In August 2023, Microsoft announced that the Xbox 360 Marketplace will be shutting down on July 29, 2024, which will also close the Xbox Original Avatar Store. Attempting to access the Xbox Avatar store on the Xbox Original Avatar app on Xbox One, Xbox Series X and S, or Windows 10 and 11 after the shutdown will fail and give an error.

== Xbox Original Avatar Awards (Xbox 360) ==
Some games allow players to unlock clothing for their avatars by meeting certain conditions such as unlocking the required achievement. Games that currently award Avatar Awards are listed below. This feature is discontinued from Xbox One since the avatars on Xbox One does not support Avatar Awards anymore as of June 1, 2016.

- A World of Keflings
- After Burner Climax
- Alan Wake
- Alien Breed 2
- Alien Breed 3
- Ancients of Ooga
- Aqua
- Batman: Arkham Origins
- Bloodforge
- Blur
- Battleblock Theater
- Cars 2: The Video Game
- Castle Crashers
- Comic Jumper (Note: The game has avatar awards in a game which looks different depending on the avatar's gender. e.g. The Recon helmet avatar award from Halo Waypoint is in two different color schemes (Red for males and Dare's [from Halo 3: ODST] white Recon Helmet for females.))
- Costume Quest
- Crackdown 2
- Crazy Taxi
- Dance Central 2
- Dance Paradise
- Darwinia+
- Dead to Rights: Retribution
- Deadliest Warrior: The Game
- Deadlight
- DeathSpank
- DeathSpank: Thongs of Virtue
- Deca Sports Freedom
- Destination: Arcade
- DiRT 3
- Doom II
- Doritos Crash Course
- Doritos Crash Course 2
- Dragon's Lair
- Duke Nukem: Manhattan Project
- Dust: An Elysian Tail
- Earthworm Jim HD
- Fable 3
- Fable Anniversary
- Fable: The Journey
- Fire Pro Wrestling
- Forza Motorsport 4
- Fruit Ninja Kinect
- Full House Poker
- Gears of War 3
- Guardian Heroes
- Guitar Hero: Warriors of Rock
- The Gunstringer
- Halo 4
- Halo: Reach (Note: The game has achievements which can be used in another game to unlock avatar awards from there (e.g. a number of the achievements in Halo 3, ODST and Reach can be used in Halo Waypoint to unlock avatar awards))
- Halo Waypoint (Note: The game has avatar awards which are linked to certain achievements in another game. (e.g. All the awards in Halo Waypoint needs certain achievements unlocked in Halo: Reach, except for the Halo: Reach Beta shirt which is no longer obtainable.))
- Hybrid
- Hydro Thunder Hurricane
- Hydrophobia
- ilomilo
- Jet Set Radio
- Joy Ride Turbo
- Karaoke
- Kinect Adventures
- Kinect Joy Ride
- Kinect Sports
- Kinect Sports: Season Two
- Kinectimals
- Lara Croft and the Guardian of Light
- Lazy Raiders
- Left 4 Dead 2
- Limbo
- Lips I Love the 80's
- Lips Party Classics
- Lips Number One Hits
- LocoCycle
- Magic: The Gathering: Duels of the Planeswalkers
- Mars Rover Landing
- Mass Effect 3
- Minecraft: Xbox 360 Edition
- Mindjack
- MLB 2K10
- Monday Night Combat
- Motocross Madness
- Ms. Splosion Man
- MX vs. ATV Alive
- Perfect Dark
- Pinball FX 2
- Poker Night 2
- Portal 2
- Prototype 2
- Radiant Silvergun
- Raskulls
- Red Dead Redemption
- Renegade Ops
- Rise of Nightmares
- Risk Factions
- Rock Band 3
- Saints Row: The Third
- Saints Row IV
- Scrap Metal
- Sega Bass Fishing
- Sega Rally Online Arcade
- Snoopy Flying Ace
- Sonic Adventure
- Sonic Adventure 2
- Sonic Free Riders
- Sonic Generations
- Sonic the Hedgehog 4: Episode I
- Sonic the Hedgehog 4: Episode II
- South Park Let's Go Tower Defense Play!
- Space Channel 5 Part 2
- Splosion Man
- Star Raiders
- The Splatters
- Super Meat Boy
- Swarm
- Toy Soldiers
- Toy Soldiers: Cold War
- Trials Evolution
- Transformers Fall of Cybertron
- UFC Trainer
- Unbound Saga
- Warlords
- World of Tanks: Xbox 360 Edition
- Worms: Ultimate Mayhem
- Wreckateer
- Xbox Live Labs
- Yar's Revenge
- You Don't Know Jack

== Technical details of Xbox Original Avatars ==
Avatars are a collection of data, less than 1 kB, describing character details such as clothing and facial features, propagated to Xbox.com. These avatars can be as personalized as the player wants them to be, detailing all the way down to the size. However, players can also create an avatar that does not represent them at all. Like a roaming user profile the Avatar will follow the player wherever they log on. This makes the avatar the actual player in the virtual world.

The Xbox 360 System Software includes a renderer and animation system that creates Avatars as they are seen in Microsoft's own titles. It is also possible for developers to use the data and process it with their own software, allowing Avatars to be easily integrated with a game's engine.

Developers are able to use the data to create random Avatars to populate their game, or to create specific Avatars for specific roles.

Avatar bodies are animated using skeletal animation, whereas Avatar faces are animated by changing the eye and mouth textures.

Microsoft has posted a comprehensive look at the technical details behind the Xbox Live Avatar system on their engineering blog.

Avatar images are available for use on Internet forums, social network services, as an email signature, or on a blog. They can be accessed by using the following user-specific URLs (replacing GAMERTAG with the Xbox Live Gamertag):

- Full Avatar: http://avatar.xboxlive.com/avatar/GAMERTAG/avatar-body.png
- Posing Full Avatar: http://avatar.xboxlive.com/avatar/GAMERTAG/avatarpic-xl.png 1080x1080
- Large icon/gamer picture: http://avatar.xboxlive.com/avatar/GAMERTAG/avatarpic-l.png
- Small icon/gamer picture: http://avatar.xboxlive.com/avatar/GAMERTAG/avatarpic-s.png

== See also ==
- Mii
- PlayStation Home
