= List of cancelled PlayStation Portable games =

The PlayStation Portable is a handheld video game console released by Sony in 2004. This list documents games that were confirmed for the PSP at some point, but did not end up being released for it in any capacity.

== Games ==
There are currently 31 games on this list. (Note: This number is always up to date by this script.)

List of cancelled PlayStation Portable games
| Title(s) | Notes/Reasons | Developer | Publisher |
|---|---|---|---|
| 100 Bullets | A video game adaption of the 100 Bullets comic book series was announced by Acclaim Entertainment for release on the PlayStation 2 and original Xbox. This version of the game was cancelled amid Acclaim's financial troubles in the mid-2000s. D3 Publisher obtained the rights to the franchise shortly after, and announced plans to release an unrelated game in the franchise for a variety of platforms, PSP included, though none of those versions ever materialized either. The comic's primary writer, Brian Azzarello, later explained that the developers had trouble translating the comic's story into the video game format. | | D3 Publisher |
| 6Gun | A military-themed third person shooter game announced in 2005 for the PlayStation 2, PlayStation Portable, and Xbox scheduled for release the following year. A few screenshots were shown at the time of its announcement, but the game was cancelled after the closure of its developer. | Battleborn | |
| Advent Shadow | Originally announced for the PSP as a side story of the console game Advent Rising (2005), poor sales of that game, coupled with financial struggles and layoffs at publisher Majesco, led to its cancellation. | Full Fat | Majesco |
| Age of Elements | The game was first announced at E3 2006, where it was reportedly 40% complete. An early playable build of the game was present at the show, with IGN describing it as a fighting game mix between Tekken and Powerstone. While the game was scheduled for release in late 2006 and early 2007 timeframe, it was cancelled prior to release. | Steamroll | Atari |
| Batman Begins | A video game adaption of the Batman Begins film was announced for the PlayStation 2, GameCube, original Xbox, Game Boy Advance, and the PSP, though the PSP was the only announced version that was cancelled and did not release alongside the movie in June 2005. | Eurocom | Electronic Arts |
| Battlefield 2: Modern Combat | A companion version of the game was announced for the PSP alongside the PlayStation 2, Xbox 360, and original Xbox versions, but the PSP version was never completed and subsequently cancelled. | EA Bright Light | Electronic Arts |
| Black & White Creatures | A spinoff of the Black & White series of games was announced for the PSP and Nintendo DS in May 2005. While the original was a large scale god game for PC platforms, the handheld versions were more of a smaller scale pet simulator adaption of the original concept. Both versions were cancelled and never released, though a very early build of the DS version leaked onto the internet in 2021. | Full Fat | Majesco |
| BloodRayne | An original entry in the BloodRayne series was in development for the PSP, and would have focused on a new two-player cooperative mode. It was one of a number of games cancelled by publisher Majesco around late 2005 and early 2006 due to the company's financial troubles. | Full Fat | Majesco |
| Destroy All Humans! Big Willy Unleashed | Originally in development for the Wii, with PlayStation 2 and PSP version in development later, only the Wii version ever released. The PS2 version was cancelled due to THQ's financial issues at the time, while the PSP version was cancelled due to the development team's struggles with adapting the Wii game's controls to a PSP's controls. | Locomotive Games | THQ |
| Duke Nukem Trilogy | At E3 2008, Deep Silver and Apogee announced three new entries in the Duke Nukem series for the Nintendo DS and PSP, under the collective name "Duke Nukem Trilogy". The three games, subtitled Critical Mass, Chain Reaction, and Proving Grounds, would form a continuous narrative of Duke traveling through time to different eras, such as the future or World War II. However, the games underwent a troubled multi-year development process, and only the DS version of Critical Mass was released in 2011, with PSP version and the other two games being cancelled. A build of the PSP version of Critical Mass was later found at the Library of Congress in 2014, and eventually shared online. | Frontline Studios | Apogee Entertainment, Deep Silver |
| Earthworm Jim | Also known as Earthworm Jim PSP, the game was a planned entry in the Earthworm Jim series of video games, in development for the PSP. Initially thought to be a remake of the original Earthworm Jim (1994), it was later revealed that it would contain mostly original content. The game was reported to reunite some of the developers who had worked on the acclaimed Earthworm Jim and Earthworm Jim 2 (1995) but been absent during production of the more poorly received Earthworm Jim 3D (1999) and Earthworm Jim: Menace 2 the Galaxy (2000). Although said to be 80% complete in August 2006 and slated for an early 2007 release date, the game was ultimately cancelled in mid-2007 due to financial issues at publisher Atari at the time. | Shiny Entertainment | Atari |
| The Elder Scrolls Travels: Oblivion | A version of Oblivion was in development for the PSP across 2006 and 2007. It was announced alongside a PS3 version, though the PSP version would have been a smaller, simpler adaptation of the game in the vein of their Elder Scrolls Travels sub-series. The game was reportedly cancelled due to a lack of funds and time to complete it satisfactily. Footage of the game leaked onto the internet in 2016. | Climax Studios | Bethesda Softworks |
| Godzilla Unleashed | The third entry in Pipeworks Software's series of Godzilla fighting games was initially announced to be receiving portable versions for PSP and Nintendo DS alongside the main console release on Wii. However, while the game was released on Wii, DS and PlayStation 2 in 2007, the PSP version was cancelled. | Pipeworks Software | Atari |
| Gunbird 2 Remix | The 1998 arcade game has been re-released on a variety of consoles in the year, but the remixed version announced for the PSP in 2009 never materialized. | Psikyo | PM Studios |
| The Incredibles: Rise of the Underminer | A video game sequel to the 2004 film The Incredibles was announced for all platforms active at the time, though only the PSP version was cancelled. | Pacific Coast Power & Light | THQ |
| Makai Wars | Initially teased in Makai Kingdom: Chronicles of the Sacred Tome, Makai Wars was announced in 2004 to be releasing on the PSP, with a PlayStation 3 version announced the following year. Following the announcement, Nippon Ichi Software did not comment further on the game's development, and it spent over a decade being treated as vaporware. The game ultimately released as a free-to-play mobile title in 2018. | Nippon Ichi Software | Nippon Ichi Software |
| Painkiller: Hell Wars | After its initial 2004 PC release, the game was announced for the PSP, PlayStation 2 and the original Xbox. While a playable version of the PSP version was present at E3 2006, only the Xbox version ever released. | People Can Fly | DreamCatcher Interactive |
| Putty Squad | In 2010, it was announced that that a remake of Putty Squad (1994) was coming to most active platforms at the time. While the announcement included the PSP, by the time the remake released in 2013, the platform had become inactive, and versions were released for the PlayStation Vita and Nintendo 3DS handhelds that had released in the meantime. | System 3 | System 3 |
| Puzzle Quest 2 | Originally announced for the Nintendo DS, Xbox 360, mobile devices, Windows and the PSP in 2010, it was released for all platforms except PSP later that year. The following year, the president of developer Infinite Interactive said the PSP version had been cancelled after the company had run out of manpower to complete that version. Infinite Interactive being acquired by Firemint Studios, who were subsequently acquired by Electronic Arts, were also cited as complications that helped cancel the completion and release of the PSP version. | Infinite Interactive | D3 Publisher |
| Rayman Raving Rabbids | While a PSP version of the multiplatform release was announced at the time of its reveal, it never materialized. No details on it were released, making it unclear if it was a minigame compilation like its console iterations, or a platformer like the Nintendo DS and Game Boy Advance | Ubisoft | Ubisoft |
| Road to Sunday | A game that combined American football with aspects of a story-driven fighting game. It was announced the PSP and PlayStation 2 and presented at E3 2005 in June, but was cancelled by the following month. Sony, its publisher, cited not making their internal quality standards, as the reason for its cancellation. | San Diego Studio | Sony Computer Entertainment |
| Saints Row: Undercover | An iteration of the Saints Row series was in development for the PSP in 2006. Unlike many PSP companion games, the game retained a full open world environment to explore. The game was very far into development, but was cancelled by publisher THQ, who, according to Volition, did not share the developer's enthusiasm for the game. In 2016, Volition themselves leaked the game onto the internet for people to download for free, with Volition stating they had retained the rights to do so. | Volition | THQ |
| Sonic Generations | In 2017, a disc containing an unannounced PSP version of Sonic Generations (2011) was found. The disc contained a 2009 build of the game, which was damaged but somewhat functional, and fans were able to recover several game assets such as an early logo, button prompts, a debug menu, and a level screenshot. The recoveries suggested that the content was identical to the eventual 3DS version of the game. TheGamer speculated that Sega canceled the PSP version due to the impending launch of the PlayStation Vita. | Dimps | Sega |
| Space Station Tycoon | A spiritual successor to Outpost Kaloki X scheduled for release on the Wii and PSP, the game missed its scheduled release date of August/September 2007, never received a new release timeframe, and never released for either platform. | Wahoo Studios | Namco Bandai |
| SpongeBob SquarePants: Lights, Camera, Pants! | Ports of the game for Nintendo DS and PSP were announced alongside the other versions, but were never released. | | THQ |
| Star Wars: The Force Unleashed II | Originally announced to release alongside the PlayStation 3, Xbox 360, Wii, and Nintendo DS versions in October 2010, the PSP version was abruptly cancelled without explanation 2 months prior to its release. | LucasArts | LucasArts |
| State of Emergency 2 | Originally announced for PlayStation 2, Xbox, and Windows, the game was cancelled as a result of BAM! Entertainment's bankruptcy. The game was later acquired by DC Studios, who released the game for PS2 in 2006. A PlayStation Portable version was announced to follow later that year, but was never released. | DC Studios | SouthPeak Interactive |
| Sticky Balls | Similar on concept to billiards, the game was announced in 2004, and present at E3 2004 as a PSP game. However, after the developers were bought out by Tiger Telematics, the PSP release was cancelled in favor of a 2005 release on their short-lived Gizmondo handheld. | Warthog | Warthog |
| Thor: God of Thunder | A video game adaption of the 2011 film was announced for the many platforms, including the PSP. In early 2011, publisher Sega announced that the PSP version had been cancelled in favor of a Nintendo 3DS version. | Red Fly Studio | Sega |
| Traxion | A music-based video game announced for the PSP in 2006, where players could import their music collection into their PSPs, and the game would generate minigames and puzzles from them, with different music generating different content. The game was present at E3 2006, where it received positive reception from publications, but in January 2007, it was announced that the game had been cancelled. While specific reasons were not disclosed, the cancellation announcement noted that both the developer and publisher had mutually agreed to part ways and cancel it. | Kuju Entertainment | LucasArts |
| Ushiro | A "spirit-horror" roleplaying video game announced for the PSP in 2008 by Level-5. Despite cross-media plans such as manga and light novels releasing in subsequent years, the game never released on the PSP. A decade later, Level-5 announced that development had moved to the Nintendo Switch, though, to-date, the game has not released their either. | Level-5 | Level-5 |
