= Akimi Village =

2011 video game

- Developer: NinjaBee
- Publisher: Sony Online Entertainment
- Platform: PlayStation 3
- Release: NA: June 15, 2011; EU: June 22, 2011
- Genre: Adventure
- Mode: Single-player

Akimi Village is an adventure building simulator video game developed by NinjaBee in 2011 for the PlayStation 3 Network.

== Plot ==
The game is on a mysterious floating island in the sky where the tiny Akimi villagers are trapped in the tight grip of the Gloom's thick shadow. Players must help the Akimi by putting the villagers to work harvesting and refining resources, unlocking a huge set of blueprints to rebuild their village, spread the light and purify the island from the Gloom's dark power.

== Reception ==
Reception

Aggregate scores
Aggregator	Score
GameRankings	71.64%
Metacritic	69/100

Review scores
Publication	Score
Destructoid	8.5/10
GameSpot	6.5/10
IGN	6.5/10
Gamers Daily	6.5/10
Console Monster	80/100

Akimi Village received mixed reviews from critics, achieving a Metacritic score of 69 out of 100. Maurice Tan of Destructoid gave a positive review of the game, describing it as "a fantastic little game" and comparing it favourably to Ninjabee's previous games, A Kingdom for Keflings and A World for Keflings. Tan also noted that the game's mechanics subtly portrayed the player character as a "slaver overlord". Tim Leigh, writing in Console Monster, also gave a positive review, describing it as "very fun" and praising the game's visuals.

Ian MacKinnon of Gamers Daily gave a mixed review, praising it as "enjoyable" but also stating that it had very little replay value. Neilie Johnson of IGN also gave a mixed review, writing that it was "fun for the first hour or two", but criticising it as "long on repetition and short on reward", and stating that the building mechanics were not improved from the earlier Keflings games.
