= Band of Bugs =

2007 video game

- Developer: NinjaBee
- Publisher: Microsoft Game Studios
- Platforms: Xbox 360, Windows
- Release: Xbox 360; June 20, 2007; Windows; December 3, 2007
- Genre: Turn-based tactics
- Modes: Single-player, multiplayer

Band of Bugs is a turn-based tactics video game developed by NinjaBee. The game includes a level editor, leaderboards, Xbox Live Vision camera support, and multiplayer gameplay. It was released for the Xbox 360 via Xbox Live Arcade on June 20, 2007.

A Microsoft Windows version was released in December of the same year. Band of Bugs is also available on Xbox One through the Backward Compatibility program.

== Gameplay ==

The game is focused on turn-based tactical battles between groups of anthropomorphic bugs, with each player controlling a number of individual bugs. The game includes a variety of different bug types (as units), each serving in a different combat role (e.g., heavy infantry, archer, support, etc.). As the title is intended to appeal to casual gamers (among others), turns are relatively quick and combats are small in scale.

In contrast to many turn-based games where either an entire side moves at once or individuals move according to some initiative value, units in Band of Bugs take turns. When sides have an equal number of units, each side moves a single unit at a time before ceding control to the other side. When one side has more units than the other, that side takes a proportionally greater number of moves at a time, e.g. two moves to every one of the opposition when one side has twice as many units as the other. The same unit may not be moved more than once per full turn, with a full turn ending after all units have acted. This system helps ensure that players do not spend an excessive amount of time waiting for their opponents to act.

Units vary in their statistics and capabilities, with most units having at least one special ability which can be used instead of a standard attack. Some bug types have multiple weapons or attack types (e.g., one ranged and one mêlée weapon) which can be switched between at the cost of an action. Lastly, some bugs can make use of magic, with various spells which can be cast a limited number of times per battle.

While there are a limited number of items which can be picked up and used at a later point in time, Band of Bugs features no significant resource management elements above and beyond troop management.

=== Campaign ===
The single-player campaign consists of 20 levels, which each level being unlocked after the previous level has been completed. Unlike traditional campaigns in strategy games, levels are completely disjoint from one another, with no "carry over" from one level to the next. Instead, for each level, the player is provided with a fixed set of units (at a certain experience level) and items. The levels are tied together by a brief (but humorous) story which revolves around Maal, the protagonist, and his quest to discover the true nature of the threat to his homeland.

Level objectives range from defeating all foes, to destroying a certain key enemy or enemy object, to simply escaping the area with one or more units. Some battles feature more than two sides, with a third side hostile to one or both of the other two sides.

After a level is completed, the player is awarded a medal based on his or her performance. The performance score is calculated based on friendly losses, enemy losses, and the total amount of clock time taken (encouraging quick play). Players can replay any previous level at any time in order to attempt to earn a better medal.

=== Multiplayer ===
Band of Bugs includes five multiplayer modes, including Elimination, Capture, Escape, Mission, and Spider Hunter. Spider Hunter is a join-and-leave continuous game for up to 8 players, and the other modes support up to 4 players over Xbox Live or 2 players in local multiplayer on one Xbox.

=== Level editor ===
The game features a level editor in which players can create campaign levels in the game. Additionally, Band of Bugs is the first Xbox Live Arcade game to allow players to share user created maps. After playing a game against an opponent on a unique map, a "Save Map" option is presented which allows the map to be stored for later use. Each map is stamped with the Gamertag of the user who first created it, so that the original author can always be identified.

At their most basic, maps consist of squares of different terrain positioned at different heights. Some terrain types slow unit movement, while other terrain squares damage those who enter them. Water tiles are also available, which, while having no effect on flying units, will cause ground units to drown.

== Development ==
The team working on Band of Bugs varied from three to four individuals at the start, up to around a dozen individuals (some of whom were part-time) at its peak. The development of the game required roughly 10 months, which was partially because the engine was based on the Outpost Kaloki X engine.

During an interview, the development team emphasized their commitment to Xbox Live Arcade and focusing on gameplay over graphics or cutscenes. As such, the title uses under 50 MB of storage space, despite Microsoft raising the limit for later Xbox Live Arcade titles to 150 MB.

Band of Bugs was a finalist in the 2007 Independent Games Festival in the Technical Excellence category.

== Downloadable content ==
Several DLCs for the game were released in 2007. In July, two map packs were released. Each included 5 new maps for multiplayer games and stand alone missions. While "Map Pack #2" was free for download, "Map Pack #1" had to be purchased. In August, a content package entitled "Red Kingdom" was released. This collection includes a new map tile set, a new campaign with 10 new levels, and 2 new unit types. In October, a content package entitled "Ninja Sticks of Fury" was released. This collection includes a new map tile set (snowy), an all-new campaign with 10 new levels and new characters, and 1 new unit type.

NinjaBee released Avatar support for the game in July 2009 via a free patch. A new DLC campaign pack titled "Tales of Kaloki", based on Outpost Kaloki, offering a new story, new units, new unit types, a new map tile, weapons and abilities was also released in the same month along with a Band of Bugs Premium Dashboard Theme.

== Reception ==
Reception

Aggregate score
Aggregator	Score	
Aggregator	PC	Xbox 360
Metacritic	72/100	68/100

Review scores
Publication	Score	
Publication	PC	Xbox 360
Eurogamer	N/A	7/10
GameSpot	N/A	6.3/10
IGN	N/A	6.2/10
Official Xbox Magazine (UK)	N/A	8/10
Official Xbox Magazine (US)	N/A	8/10
TeamXbox	N/A	7/10

Band of Bugs received "average" reviews on both platforms according to the review aggregation website Metacritic. Official Xbox Magazine (UK) called the game "refreshingly unique". Many reviews were more critical, criticizing glitches and a general lack of strategic depth. IGN remarked that while the Xbox 360 version has all the necessary basic elements, it lacks gameplay depth and the ability to customize units. GameSpot considered the game to be "too simplistic to be addictive" and too frustrating for players looking for a casual strategy game. Overall, the enjoyment of the colorful graphics and the map editor were tempered by concerns about the game's longevity for genre fans.

== See also ==
- Advance Wars
- Cloning Clyde
- Commanders: Attack of the Genos
- Final Fantasy Tactics
- Outpost Kaloki X
