= Boingz =

2008 video game

- Developer: NinjaBee
- Publisher: RealNetworks
- Platform: Wii
- Release: NA: November 24, 2008
- Genre: Action
- Modes: Single-player, multiplayer

Boingz is a Wii game developed by NinjaBee and published by RealNetworks that was released on November 24, 2008. It costs 1000 Wii Points.

== Overview ==
Boingz sees the player trying to help creatures lost on an alien world by helping them find the magical gates that will take them home. The game features 30 side scrolling levels.

Using the Wii Remote, the players is able to flick around stretchy alien creatures by grabbing their antenna and pulling it in an opposite direction to launch them around the platforms. Around the level are additional creatures to flick around and use to solve puzzles. The player can also stretch the creature out and attach a thumbtack to their antenna to attach objects to them in order to pick up items and to pull down weights to open doors to other areas. However, the player will also have to find and collect Twinklies to power-up their creatures' elastic-power.

== Reception ==
IGN gave it a 7/10, calling the game "fun and unique" with "satisfyingly clever" gameplay mechanics and level design, though they also weren't impressed by the presentation. 1UP.com gave it a C− grade, calling the idea "clever" but with gameplay that "steadily gives way to restless fatigue" and graphics that are "a complete eyesore".
