= Space Station Tycoon =

- North American Wii box art
- Developer: Wahoo Studios
- Publisher: Namco Bandai
- Platforms: Wii, PlayStation Portable
- Release: Unreleased
- Genre: Business simulation game
- Modes: Single Player, Multiplayer, Co-Op

Space Station Tycoon was a video game to be released in for the Wii developed by Wahoo Studios (developer of Outpost Kaloki X) and published by Namco Bandai.

== History ==
The game had a projected release date of August 28, 2007. By August 7, 2007 there was open speculation by IGN that the game may be cancelled or have its release significantly delayed, though a developer on the game denied these claims. A later release date of February 2008 had been published.

A version for the PlayStation Portable had also been announced. However a later developer interview indicated the game would be a Wii exclusive.

== Gameplay ==
In this business simulation game, players take on the role of Shawn and his monkey sidekick, Tam, as they build and maintain space stations. The game also features 30 other characters. It features a level-based system, where gamers have to complete a set of mission objectives—including "light puzzle solving"—to progress to the next stage and further expand their empire.

The game lets players use the motion sensing of the Wii Remote to create gravity points and interact with objects in the environment, as well as undertaking tasks such as catching asteroids to stop them from smashing into the space station and lobbing cannonballs at space pirates. In addition to a single player mode, there is also a multiplayer mode and co-op play elements.

== Reception ==
The game was noted for its similarities to Outpost Kaloki X. Wired called the game a sequel, though Game Developer said it was not an official sequel. During an interview, developer Brent Fox explained that the game had more action and a different pacing then Outpost Kaloki X.

The game was seen by Robert Summa of Destructoid as an important piece of third party software for the then new Nintendo Wii.
