= Saga (2008 video game) =

SAGA
- Developer: Silverlode Interactive
- Designer: Jason Faller
- Engine: Wraith
- Platform: Microsoft Windows
- Release: 4 March 2008
- Genres: Massively multiplayer online real-time strategy, collectible card game
- Mode: Multiplayer

Saga is a massively multiplayer online real-time strategy game. Saga is touted as the world's first collectible online real-time strategy game. Saga was released on 4 March 2008, after a brief open beta which began a month earlier on 26 February. Developed by American studios Wahoo Studios and Silverlode Interactive, the game ran a closed Beta starting on 5 July 2007. The title has no subscription fees, instead being supported by the release of booster or expansion packs. It's possible to play a free version of the game, with certain features locked, at the Saga official site.

Saga launched into hobby stores around the United States and Canada following GAMA 2008. SAGA has partnered with Alliance Game Distributors, GTS Distribution, Diamond Comics and ACD Distribution, with an emphasis to focus on game and card stores to sell the booster packs.

== Plot ==
Saga is set in a fantasy world where an age-old strife exists between five competing Gods. Each God heads up a faction with unique races and abilities. The factions are Magic (Dark Elves), Machines (Dwarves), Nature (Elves), War (Orcs and Ogres), Undead (Undead) and Light (Giants and Humans). Each faction is diametrically opposed to two other factions. For example, Machines hates Magic (they are naturally opposite, technology vs. mysticism), and Machines also hates Nature (machines vs. living things). Nature also despises War, for their tendency to destroy nature. Light faction are champions of order and justice, while Magic faction delve deep into the black arts, and the circle completes itself. Each faction has an ethos and a strategic quality that sets it apart, giving players a spectrum of play styles to identify with. The system is designed to create a balanced tension between the factions, giving each faction two archenemies and two neutrals to war with or form alliances with. The result is a world where endless war is inevitable.

However, the Machine (Dwarf) and Nature (Elf) factions have put aside their differences to join the Order (Machine, Nature, Light), and the remaining factions have joined the Brotherhood (War, Magic, Undead). The Undead faction is a recent addition and not part of the original five races.

== Gameplay ==
Saga combines the trading card game (TCG) sensibilities of Magic: The Gathering, the MMO persistency of RPGs, and the kingdom management and mass battles of RTS titles such as Rome: Total War.

Gameplay in Saga is best described in two states: kingdom management and battle.

=== Kingdom Management ===
In keeping with the RTS genre, gameplay in Saga revolves around managing a persistent, online kingdom. Each player is given a plot of land by their faction God, which they must develop and improve. These improvements include building defensive walls and towers, researching new technology at the university, and harvesting the available resources.

Players, at the time of nation creation, choose which layout their nation will have. Then, as their resources grow (by questing or by peasant workforce) they can build buildings. Building spots are chosen by a system called "Free Build". Free build lets the user place buildings wherever they want, although there is a limit to how many of each building a player can build. Resources can be played on colored squares (brown = wood, gray = stone, gold = gold, purple = mana). There are an excess of these squares though, so one is not limited.

Additionally, players maintain a population of peasants, which rises and falls depending on the popularity of the player as a leader. Unpopular leaders can suffer riots, leading to extensive damage to structures and mass desertions by peasants. A player will gain peasants by capturing houses in quests or in PvP. At 74 happiness one's peasants will riot and at 90 one gains production bonuses. Any happiness above this is excess and should be used to tax the peasants. Normally, if the happiness is above 74 the player gains 4 peasants a day. After the happiness system was patched in 2008, peasant happiness is no longer displayed as a numerical value. Happiness is gained by winning battles (PvP or quests), bribery and by having sufficient food and housing. Generally, having happiness in 'jubilant' is considered ideal.

=== Battle ===
==== Troops ====
Saga employs a booster pack system to amass troops. Each player receives an initial starter pack, as one would with a TCG, featuring a collection of various individual troops. These troops must be placed into like units to create an army. When more troops are needed, players buy "booster packs", which are a random selection of 10 troops ranging from common to rare. These troops can then be drafted into existing units, or traded off to other players. Through the trading system, players can customize their armies and trade for exactly what they are looking for. Trading takes place in the market, which also allows for resources to be traded, and troops to be bought and sold. There are also third party sites that sell individual cards.

Units grow in experience, increasing their base efficacy. Additionally, units can be further upgraded through collecting special armor and weapons. Each unit can equip one armor and one weapon. This gear is obtained through Questing against computer-controlled opponents. Armor and weapons are subdivided into numerous types. For example, dragons use wards and charms, while mechanical (sometimes called 'machine', not to be confused with Machine faction) units mostly use siege gears and plates.

==== Combat ====
Combat in Saga is real-time, in keeping with the RTS genre, and consists of maneuvering units around the field to fight and gain an advantage over the enemy. Spells, special abilities and reinforcements add to the various strategies that can be employed to gain an advantage. Battles can be fought against computer-controlled opponents through the Quest system, or against other players in PvP battles. While quests largely take place on neutral battlefields across the world of Saga, PvP battles are city-to-city conflicts between the competing players. PvP battles can be fought between two or four players, either on teams or as a free-for-all. In PvP combat, the two (or four) players have their kingdoms stitched together so that battles take place upon their lands. Being a persistent world, damage inflicted during PvP battles in 'hardcore' mode carries over, including the pillaging and destruction of opponent's buildings, and the death of troops. Dead troops can be resurrected in temples using God-favor, a combat-based resource. PvP battles can be fought in "scrimmage" mode, which allows for players to compete without any permanent damage being done to their kingdoms or troops; no experience or resource rewards are accumulated through "scrimmage" games. Battles fought in 'normal' mode will result in death of troops but building damage will not carry over, but rewards are less than in 'hardcore' mode. It is common practice among friendly matches to have an agreement not to excessively damage buildings during a 'hardcore' battle. Therefore, both parties receive battle rewards as in 'hardcore' mode while damage inflicted is kept to a minimum.

== SAGA Online in Europe ==
Deep Silver published SAGA Online for Europe. The closed beta test started on 16 March 2010 and official website of SAGA Online EU launched one week after the closed beta start.
