= FunTown Mahjong =

- Developer: FunTown World Limited
- Publisher: Microsoft Game Studios
- Platform: Xbox 360 (XBLA)
- Release: NA: January 28, 2009
- Genres: Card and Board
- Mode: Single player

FunTown Mahjong is a board video game based on Mahjong released on January 28, 2009 for the Xbox Live Arcade. It was created by Taiwanese developer Funtown World Studios.

== Gameplay ==
- Classic gameplay: A clear scoring system and the standard 16-tile Mahjong rules provide a classic gaming experience.
- Great visuals: The vivid audio and visuals keep you in the game, and give you the ability to change background images and tiles.
- Easy to learn: The simple tutorial mode gives you all the information you need for those new to the game.

== Reception ==
FunTown Mahjong received mixed to negative reviews on release. On Metacritic, the game holds a score of 44/100 based on 7 reviews. Ryan Geddes of IGN gave the game a 4.5/10, criticizing it for its confusing tutorial, poor presentation and the missed opportunity for in-game support of Xbox Avatars despite Microsoft publishing the game.
