= A World of Keflings =

2010 video game

- Developer: NinjaBee
- Publisher: Microsoft Studios
- Platforms: Xbox 360 (XBLA); Microsoft Windows; Wii U
- Release: Xbox 360; December 22, 2010; Windows 8; March 13, 2013; Wii U; November 13, 2014; Steam; July 29, 2025
- Genre: City-building game
- Modes: Single-player, multiplayer

A World of Keflings is a city-building video game developed by NinjaBee for the Xbox Live Arcade. It was released on December 22, 2010, and is a sequel to the 2008 video game A Kingdom for Keflings. An updated Steam port on PC was released on July 29, 2025.

== Gameplay ==
The game follows the player's Avatar (or Mii, in the Wii U version), who is a giant in the world of the Keflings. As in the previous game, the Keflings are tiny people, similar to elves, who need the player's assistance to build-up their kingdoms. The player helps them by harvesting resources and constructing buildings, tasks that can be delegated to the Keflings as well. Throughout the game, the player completes missions and visits three separate kingdoms; the Ice Kingdom, the Forest Kingdom, and the Desert Kingdom. Each kingdom features its own unique climate, resources, and characters. The players gain access to additional content if they also own ilomilo, Cloning Clyde or Raskulls.

In addition to the online multiplayer component carried over from its predecessor, A World of Keflings features local multiplayer, allowing two players to work together in the same world to accomplish tasks.

== Development, release, and marketing ==
A World of Keflings was released for Xbox Live Arcade on December 22, 2010, for the Windows 8 Game Store on March 13, 2013, and for the Wii U on November 13, 2014. It is described by its developers as "much more than a sequel", and was designed with a more diverse environment and a heavier story focus. The game was released as part of Microsoft's Games for the Holidays promotion, along with ilomilo and Raskulls. It also became part of the Avatar Famestar program from Microsoft Studios.

Three downloadable expansion packs were released for the Xbox Live version, known as "It Came from Outer Space" on October 25, 2011, "Sugar, Spice, and Not So Nice" on October 9, 2012, and "The Curse of the Zombiesaurus" on October 16, 2012, each following a different plot taking place after the main game. On January 16, 2012, there was a vote on the "PlayXBLA" website that allowed fans to choose the next theme of DLC. The options were between Graveyard, Candy, or Pirate. The vote also held a raffle style contest for prizes such as, being turned into a "Kefling" in the game, t-shirts, plushies, and game codes. The developers encouraged fans to vote every day to earn another chance for the prizes. The result of the fan contest led to the creation of the "Sugar, Spice, and Not So Nice" DLC while the graveyard theme was seemingly also used for "The Curse of the Zombiesaurus" due to their similar themes and close release dates to the "Sugar, Spice, And Not So Nice" DLC. All three expansions were included along with the Wii U release.

A World of Keflings Soundtrack was released to Steam on October 24, 2025. It contains 10 tracks total coming from the base game and all 3 DLC.

"The Curse of the Zombiesaurus" was rereleased for the Steam version of the game on October 24, 2025, alongside "4 new giants" in a free update.

"Sugar, Spice and Not So Nice" was rereleased for the Steam version of the game on March 5, 2026.

In March of 2026, a free update to the Steam version added a set of decorative collectibles that can be shared to others through unique codes.

"It Came From Outer Space" was rereleased for the Steam version of the game on April 21, 2026.

"Which Witch" became the first steam exclusive expansion pack for the steam version of the game on November 6, 2026.

== Reception ==
Reception

Aggregate score
| Aggregator | Score | | |
| Aggregator | PC | Wii U | Xbox 360 |
|---|---|---|---|
| Metacritic | N/A | 70/100 | 77/100 |

Review scores
| Publication | Score | | |
| Publication | PC | Wii U | Xbox 360 |
|---|---|---|---|
| Game Informer | N/A | N/A | 8.25/10 |
| GamesRadar+ | N/A | N/A | 3/5 |
| IGN | N/A | N/A | 8/10 |
| Jeuxvideo.com | N/A | N/A | 14/20 |
| Nintendo Life | N/A | 8/10 | N/A |
| Nintendo World Report | N/A | 6.5/10 | N/A |

A World of Keflings received generally favorable reviews for the Xbox 360 version, earning 77/100, and mixed or average reviews for the Wii U version, scoring 70/100 on review aggregator Metacritic Levi Buchanan of IGN gave the game an 8.0 out of 10, praising its humor and pacing, though pointing out the difficulty of working in crowded areas.

According to Gamasutra, the game was a top seller for the first half of 2011, and sold over 224,000 copies by the end of the year. It sold 1,800,000 copies worldwide as of 2018.
