= Traxion (video game) =

- Developer: Kuju Entertainment
- Publisher: LucasArts
- Platform: PSP
- Release: Cancelled
- Genre: Music
- Mode: Single player

Traxion was a rhythm game for the PlayStation Portable by British developer Kuju Entertainment. It was scheduled to be released in Q4 2006 by LucasArts, but was cancelled in January 2007. The game was to feature a number of minigames, and would support imported songs from the player's own library as well as the game's bundled collection. The game was received well at E3 2006, with Wired calling it "the best thing they had on the show floor".

== Gameplay ==
The game combined music and puzzles by allowing players to user their own MP3s, stored on a memory stick, as the basis for more than 20 puzzles. From your music collection, the game created 24 minigames around the audio. The style and pace of each game would vary depending on the rhythm of the song and the genre of the song. The background and objects in the game were changed by the game engine to match the songs. The game would have also come with a couple of tracks.

One of the minigames developed before cancellation was one where the player had to hit notes in time with the music. In another, a cooking minigame, food flies at a chef in time to the music, and the player must control the chef to prepare the food, also in time with the music.

The game picked up the award for Technical Excellence from major consumer website IGN at E3 2006.

== Cancellation ==
On 4 January 2007, LucasArts announced the cancellation of Traxion. "Kuju and LucasArts have mutually agreed to sever their relationship with respect to the development of the Traxion product," a representative said. The same representative refused to comment on why it was canceled.

== Possible republication ==
On 9 May 2007 Kuju Entertainment head Ed Daly said that they were still considering finishing the project, mentioning that they could market the game as an iPod game.
