= Ancients of Ooga =

2010 video game

- Developer(s): Bacon Wrapped Games
- Publisher(s): NinjaBee
- Platform(s): Xbox 360 (XBLA); Windows
- Release: Xbox 360: WW: June 30, 2010; Windows: WW: May 20, 2011
- Genre(s): Puzzle-platform
- Mode(s): Single-player, multiplayer

Ancients of Ooga is a 2.5D puzzle-platform game developed by NinjaBee and Bacon Wrapped Games for the Xbox Live Arcade. It was released on June 30, 2010 for Xbox Live and on May 20, 2011 for Windows.

== Plot ==
The chief of the water tribe demonstrating one of his special abilities: breathing underwater.

The story follows the Spirit of Ooga in the quest to help the Oogians exact revenge on the Boolis, after they tricked them into thinking their chiefs were evil, leading the Boolis to burn them.

== Gameplay ==
Ancients of Ooga is a side-scrolling puzzle platformer where the player controls the Spirit, who can possess the other Oogians. Oogians are separated into tribes, each with different abilities, with the chief of each tribe having enhanced versions of those abilities. In addition to these special abilities, all Oogians have the ability to swallow and vomit certain objects on the ground. This can be useful as when you are holding an item, you cannot climb a ladder, and cannot hold another item, but you can hold an item in your hands and in your stomach simultaneously, which is useful in certain situations. Near the end of the game, all of the tribe leaders join together to summon the Ancient One at a Bone Fire, who is actually just an average human that the Oogians worship.

== Release ==
The main game is available on the Xbox Live Arcade and Steam, as well as a paid downloadable expansion pack named The Forgotten Chapters, which was released for the Xbox version of the game on May 18, 2011. It follows a spin-off story that shows some of the tribes that were cut from the main game by the developers.

== Reception ==
Reception

Aggregate score
Aggregator	Score
Metacritic	69/100

Review scores
Publication	Score
Eurogamer	8/10
GameSpot	7/10
GameZone	5/10
IGN	7.5/10
Official Xbox Magazine (US)	7.5/10

Reviews of this game are mixed to good with Metacritic giving it a 69%. IGN gave the game a 7.5/10.
