= Wahoo Studios =

American computer and video game development company

Wahoo Studios, Inc
- Company type: Private company
- Industry: Video games
- Founded: 2001
- Headquarters: Orem, Utah, US
- Website: www.wahoo.com

Wahoo Studios is a computer and video game development company based in Orem, Utah. Founded in 2001, the company largely serves as consultants or on a contract basis working with larger gaming companies such as Electronic Arts and Microsoft. Historically, the development house has mostly been responsible for console games. Self-funded original games use the NinjaBee brand. Since the release of the Xbox 360, the developer has supported Xbox Live Arcade with multiple releases, including A Kingdom for Keflings and A World of Keflings.

== History ==
When Utah-based video game developer Saffire encountered difficulties in 2001, Steve Taylor left and founded Wahoo Studios, hiring other ex-Saffire employees.

In 2004, Wahoo Studios introduced the brand name NinjaBee for its self-funded games.

In January 2007, Wahoo Studios announced that they were joining the massively multiplayer online game genre with Saga, an MMORTS, based in a persistent world. In August 2007, they split - Saga Games and Silverlode Interactive finished the development of the game.

== Titles ==
Year	Title	Platform(s)	Publisher
2002	007: Nightfire		Electronic Arts
2003	XS Junior League Football	PlayStation	XS Games
2004	Outpost Kaloki	Windows	NinjaBee
2004	XS Junior League Soccer	PlayStation	XS Games
2006	Cloning Clyde	Xbox Live Arcade	NinjaBee
2006	Outpost Kaloki X	Xbox Live Arcade	NinjaBee
2007	Band of Bugs	Windows, Xbox Live Arcade	NinjaBee
2008	A Kingdom for Keflings	Xbox Live Arcade	Microsoft Studios
2008	Boingz	Wii	RealArcade
2008	Doritos: Dash of Destruction	Xbox Live Arcade	Microsoft Studios
2008	Saga	Windows	Silverlode Interactive
2010	A Kingdom for Keflings	Windows	Microsoft Studios
2010	A World of Keflings	Xbox Live Arcade	Microsoft Studios
2010	Ancients of Ooga	Xbox Live Arcade	Microsoft Studios
2010	The Amazing Brain Train!	Wii	NinjaBee
2011	A World of Keflings: It Came From Outer Space	Xbox Live Arcade	Microsoft Studios
2011	Akimi Village	PlayStation 3	Sony Online Entertainment
2011	Ancients of Ooga	Windows	Microsoft Studios
2011	Fusion: Sentient	Windows Phone	Microsoft Studios
2011	Hasbro Family Game Night 4: The Game Show	PlayStation 3, Wii, Xbox 360	Electronic Arts
2012	A World of Keflings: Sugar, Spice and Not So Nice	Xbox Live Arcade	Microsoft Studios
2013	A World of Keflings	Windows	Microsoft Studios
2013	Disney Infinity	Windows	Disney Interactive Studios
2013	Nutjitsu	Windows	NinjaBee
2014	A World of Keflings	Wii U	Microsoft Studios
2014	Nutjitsu	Xbox One	NinjaBee
2015	NHL SuperCard	Android, Fire OS, iOS	2K Sports
2015	Nutjitsu	PlayStation 4	NinjaBee
2016	Carnival Games VR	HTC Vive, Oculus Rift, PlayStation VR	2K Play
2018	A Handful of Keflings	Windows	NinjaBee
2019	One Leaves	Windows, Xbox One	Oath
2025	A World of Keflings	Windows	NinjaBee

== Unreleased ==
Wahoo Studios had been working on Space Station Tycoon.
