= Outpost Kaloki =

2004 video game

- Developer(s): NinjaBee
- Publisher(s): Microsoft Game Studios (XBLA version)
- Platform(s): Xbox 360 (XBLA), Windows
- Release: September 18, 2004 (Windows); November 22, 2005 (Xbox 360)
- Genre(s): City-building
- Mode(s): Single player

Outpost Kaloki is a city-building video game developed by NinjaBee that places the player in the role of a manager, tasked with building a financially successful fantasy space station. An enhanced port, known as Outpost Kaloki X, was available for download from Xbox Live Arcade on the Xbox 360.

== Gameplay ==
In Outpost Kaloki, players try to address the needs of visiting space voyagers, while simultaneously attempting to meet any special victory conditions for the current scenario. Players do this by analyzing the small supply and demand bars next to each of the five types of service buildings available, such as social or research. When a demand is largely unmet, it represents an opportunity to build a new structure of the appropriate type in order to satisfy that demand and earn money to provide further services. As the game progresses, players can build larger, more expensive structures which satisfy more customers at once with a higher quality of service.

As with many economic simulations, the key challenge in Outpost Kaloki involves striking the proper balance between capacity and supply as these change over time. Players must also quickly respond to unexpected events, such as meteor showers which may knock out certain facilities. Lastly, each scenario has unique requirements which must be fulfilled, such as satisfying the wants of a VIP by building a specific structure.

Additionally, there are structures which do not generate money or fulfill the needs of visitors, but which instead are key to operating the station. The primary structure categories of this form are power generation (used to power everything else on the station), and maintenance (to prevent things from breaking down over time). In the War Story, there are also defensive structures which shoot down incoming attackers or meteors.

== Versions ==
Notable differences between the Windows version and the Xbox 360 version include:

- Enhanced graphics on the Xbox 360 version.
- More than twice as many levels on the Xbox 360 release, including extra campaigns and scenarios.
- The Xbox 360 version has a leaderboard and time challenges.

The Xbox 360 version also initially contained a number of bugs which were corrected via an online update as of October 25, 2006. This included a bug which prevented 2 of the game's 12 achievements from being successfully completed, the gold medals in the later half of the Adventure Story, and the 8-port master achievement.

== See also ==
- Cloning Clyde
- Band of Bugs
