= Commanders: Attack of the Genos =

2008 video game

- Developer: Southend Interactive
- Publisher: Vivendi Games (Note: Released under the Sierra Online brand name.)
- Platform: Xbox 360
- Release: February 13, 2008
- Genre: Turn-based strategy
- Modes: Single-player, multiplayer

Commanders: Attack of the Genos (also known as Commanders: Attack!) is a 2008 turn-based strategy video game developed by Southend Interactive and published by Vivendi Games for the Xbox 360 (via Xbox Live Arcade). It features strategic troop placement and head-to-head warfare, using such weaponry as missile launchers, bombers, and infantry. The game has a 1930s art deco-style look and feel inspired by The War of the Worlds. The single-player campaign consists of 15 missions, as well as online and same machine multiplayer play of up to four players, with skirmishes and co-op play.

== Plot ==
Gameplay screenshot

Commanders: Attack of the Genos takes place in an alternate history in which humanity has discovered the secrets of atomic energy right at the start of the 20th century. By 1924, technology has accelerated to the point where humans have cracked the human genome, and have managed to create a new race of genetically modified lifeforms, dubbed Genos. Genos have been developed to be stronger, faster, and generally better on the whole than the rest of the human race, causing the rest of the world to resent the Genos. This results in their eventual exile to another land. While a tenuous peace existed between the two races for some time, the start of the game seems to indicate that the time for peace has passed, as the Genos invade.

== Reception ==
Reception

Aggregate score
Aggregator	Score
Metacritic	72/100

Review scores
Publication	Score
Eurogamer	6/10
GamePro	3.5/5
GameSpot	7/10
GamesRadar+	4/5
GameZone	8/10
IGN	7.6/10
Official Xbox Magazine (UK)	5/10
Official Xbox Magazine (US)	7/10
TeamXbox	8.5/10
411Mania	8/10

The game received "mixed or average reviews" according to the review aggregation website Metacritic.
