= Madballs in Babo: Invasion =

2009 video game

- Developer: Playbrains
- Publishers: Microsoft Game Studios; Valve (Steam)
- Composer: Greg Drover
- Platforms: Mac OS X; Microsoft Windows; Xbox 360
- Release: Xbox Live Arcade; July 15, 2009; Microsoft Windows; September 17, 2009; Mac OS X May 19, 2010
- Genre: Action
- Modes: Single-player, multiplayer

Madballs in Babo: Invasion is an action video game developed by Canadian studio Playbrains. It was released on July 15, 2009 on Xbox Live Arcade and on September 17, 2009 for Microsoft Windows.

The game reprises the 1980s Madballs toy franchise. The game is a sequel to BaboViolent 2.

== Gameplay ==
Madballs in Babo: Invasion is a shooter from a top-down perspective. Players roll their Babo, a heavily armed sphere, around in an arena, attempting to kill enemy players. There are ten unique Babos spread across two teams: the B*D*I and the Scorched. Each Babo has unique stats and abilities to utilize. For instance, the character Robo has high defenses, lacks speed and can disarm enemies with his special ability.

Most of the characters, weapons and abilities in the game are locked. A campaign mode spanning ten levels must be played to unlock characters and weapons, but downloadable content is available for purchase for players who do not wish to play the campaign. Weapons are unique due to the fact that they have two modes of firing. Most weapons may switch between ballistic and laser firing modes, with other weapons switching between heat and cold. Players may gain an advantage over opponents by switching to a weapon the enemy is weak to.

== Reception ==
Reception

Aggregate score
Aggregator	Score
Metacritic	(Xbox 360) 68/100 (PC) 79/100

Review scores
Publication	Score
Destructoid	6.5/10
Eurogamer	6/10
GameSpot	7/10
GamesRadar+	4.5/5
IGN	7.5/10

Madballs in Babo: Invasion had mixed reviews when it was released for the Xbox Live Arcade, netting it a 68 on Metacritic. IGN awarded it a 7.5, noting the graphics and gameplay foremost. GameSpot gave it a 7.0, finding the multiplayer to be solid, but the characters to be annoying. Reviews were slightly more positive for the Windows version of the game, with PC Gamer UK calling it "A surprising treat." and giving it a score of 81/100.
