= A Kingdom for Keflings =

2008 video game

- Developer: NinjaBee
- Publisher: Microsoft Studios
- Platforms: Xbox 360 (XBLA); Microsoft Windows; Cloud (OnLive)
- Release: Xbox 360; November 19, 2008; Microsoft Windows; March 20, 2010
- Genre: City-building game
- Modes: Single-player, multiplayer

A Kingdom for Keflings is a video game developed by NinjaBee for the Xbox Live Arcade which was released on November 19, 2008. It was later ported to Microsoft Windows on March 20, 2010.

== Gameplay ==
In the game, the player takes on a role of a giant in the land of the Keflings. Keflings are a small race of human-like creatures, similar to elves or gnomes. It becomes the job of the player to aid the Keflings in creating their kingdom. This is accomplished by building various structures, collecting resources, and managing the work of the Keflings. The Keflings will aid the player in gathering resources (wood, crystals, wool, and stone) and transporting them to various buildings for use in producing other buildings. Some buildings convert the resources into other products for use in building more complex structures. It is the first Xbox 360 title to allow full avatar player control in the New Xbox Experience. The game has been described as having "dashes of SimCity and Black & White". Its resource gathering system is comparable to The Settlers.

The main goal of the game is to complete the castle, thereby producing a King or Queen of the Keflings. The game, however, does not stop, and appears to officially never end, allowing the player to continue building more structures and gather more resources. There are four characters available for use in the game, all having slightly different starting statistics. As a fifth option, the player may also use their Xbox Live Avatar as their character.

The multiplayer mode is the same as the single player mode, except that up to four players may be in the game at once. The game play is drop-in/drop-out format, allowing many players to be a part of one kingdom. While visiting an online game, players may build banner towers that display their gamer picture for all players who visit that game to view. The host of an online game has the option to kick any other player that has joined the game. When a player is kicked, their game is split from the original hosted game - they get an entire copy of the world as it is, the other players appear to leave and the kicked player is left alone hosting the new game. Only the host may save an online game.

== Development, release, and marketing ==
A Kingdom For Keflings was released on the Xbox 360 on November 19, 2008, followed by Windows version on March 20, 2010. Sales were close to 610,000 units as of year-end 2011. The game had two DLC packages: Kingdom Pack 1 and Kingdom Pack 2, both released in December 2009. Each pack contained two new kingdoms for players to develop. Kingdom Pack 1 contained the Orchard Kingdom and Kingdom Crossroads, while Kingdom Pack 2 contained Relic Kingdom and Central Kingdom. The Kingdoms in the second pack are said to be of a higher difficulty.

The game features a set of five different songs that play dynamically according to the current season and the state of the village. They form a set of joyful and relaxing songs, said to be quite catchy and adding a lot of appeal to the game. At the request of fans, the developer has made the songs available for download.

== Reception ==
Reception

Aggregate score
| Aggregator | Score | |
| Aggregator | PC | Xbox 360 |
|---|---|---|
| Metacritic | 79/100 | 78/100 |

Review scores
| Publication | Score | |
| Publication | PC | Xbox 360 |
|---|---|---|
| 1Up.com | N/A | B− |
| Destructoid | N/A | 7/10 |
| Eurogamer | N/A | 7/10 |
| GamePro | N/A | 4.25/5 |
| GamesMaster | N/A | 68% |
| GameSpot | N/A | 8/10 |
| Gamezebo | 4/5 | N/A |
| IGN | 8.5/10 | 8.2/10 |
| Official Xbox Magazine (US) | N/A | 9/10 |
| TeamXbox | N/A | 8.7/10 |
| The A.V. Club | N/A | B |

The game received "generally favorable reviews" according to the review aggregation website Metacritic.

== Sequel ==
A sequel entitled A World of Keflings was released on December 22, 2010. The game increases the focus on storyline, offers "multiple kingdoms to explore, each with its own climate, resources, and culture" and includes local multiplayer. It sold over 224,000 copies as of year-end 2011. The game was released in 2013 for the Games Store on Windows 8, and for the Wii U's Nintendo eShop the following year.
