= Cloning Clyde =

2006 video game

- Developer(s): NinjaBee
- Publisher(s): Microsoft
- Platform(s): Xbox 360, Windows
- Release: Xbox 360: WW: July 19, 2006; Windows: WW: March 15, 2011
- Genre(s): Platform
- Mode(s): Single-player, multiplayer

Cloning Clyde is a side-scrolling platform game developed by NinjaBee and released on July 19, 2006 for the Xbox 360's Xbox Live Arcade and March 15, 2011 for Microsoft Windows. A group of identical clones all known as "Clyde" work together to try to escape the laboratory in which they are trapped. In November 2021, the game was made backwards compatible on Xbox One and Xbox Series X/S.

== Plot ==
Clyde is an unintelligent character who willingly signs up for genetic experiments to be carried out on him for $20. Due to a malfunction in a cloning machine, Clyde is cloned hundreds of times. The facility goes into lock-down in order to prevent him from escaping. Clyde must gather together his clones and work with them to fight their way out of the laboratory.

== Gameplay ==
Screenshot

Cloning Clyde is a side-scrolling platform game. The player has the ability to switch between multiple Clyde clones at any time in order to progress/solve increasingly complex puzzles. The puzzles mainly involve dropping rocks on switches, getting clones to stand on switches, or getting clones to stand in front of rockets and being fired across the level.

Each level begins with the player in control of a single Clyde. As they progress through the level, more Clydes can be found inside crates or created using cloning machines. Each of these clones can then be switched to and controlled by the player. Before the exit of a level can be reached, all surveillance robots must be destroyed, which opens up blocked grates leading to the exit. Only a single Clyde can leave via the exit, while the others must be directed to pipes to be saved. The game consists of 35 levels, including 25 standard levels and 10 challenge levels.

Additionally, Clydes can merge their DNA with various animals or inanimate objects in DNA combiners that give them access to new abilities. For example, merging DNA with a sheep will allow Clyde to jump long distances, and merging DNA with a frog will allow him to swim.

After the completion of each level, the player is given a score. This score is dependent on how far under the par time the player completed the level in, and also the number of "Killer Kenn" action figures that were collected.

=== Multiplayer ===
Cloning Clyde has two multiplayer modes: cooperative mode and versus mode. The cooperative mode allows for up to 4 players to work together through the same levels in the single player mode, with each player controlling a single Clyde. Versus mode is a 2v2 match in separate arenas not seen in the main game. Each team must destroy the opposing team's surveillance robots in order to win. Both multiplayer modes can be played either online using Xbox Live or locally using split screen.

== Reception ==
Reception

Aggregate score
Aggregator	Score
Metacritic	80/100

Review scores
Publication	Score
Eurogamer	8/10
GamePro	3.75/5
GameRevolution	C+
GameSpot	7.6/10
IGN	8.1/10
Official Xbox Magazine (US)	8.5/10
TeamXbox	8.6/10
The A.V. Club	B−

The Xbox 360 version received "favorable" reviews according to the review aggregation website Metacritic.
