= Kevin Riepl =

American composer

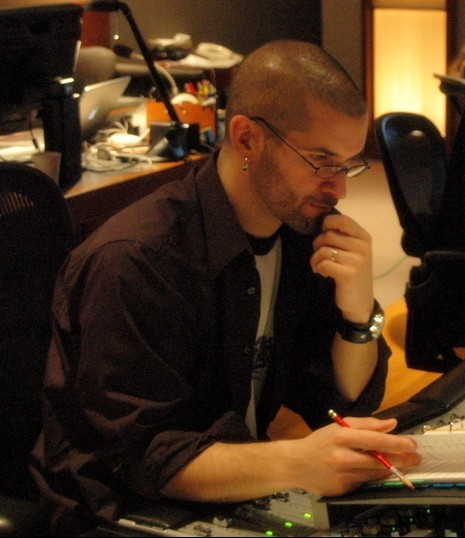
- Riepl at the Eastwood Scoring Stage at Warner Bros in 2007

Background information
- Born: Cliffwood Beach, New Jersey, U.S.
- Genres: Epic music, orchestral, industrial, electronic, ambient
- Occupation: Composer
- Years active: 2000–present
- Website: kevinriepl.com

Kevin Riepl is an American composer for video games, films and television shows. He is best known for his work on the Unreal series of games as well as Gears of War and Aliens: Colonial Marines.

== Biography ==
Riepl was born in Cliffwood Beach, New Jersey. His interest in music started at the age of six, when he began to play piano and guitar under the instruction of his uncle. In the fourth grade he began studies on the trumpet and piano and that continued throughout his high school years in which he was a member of a variety of bands and orchestras. After high school, he began private independent studies in composition and orchestration at the Village East Conservatory of Music. Following the years at the conservatory and few scoring projects, he attended Mannes College of Music in New York City for further education in composition and orchestration.

Riepl began his career working as an assistant and co-writing partner for Kevin Manthei in the early 2000s. At the time, Cliff Bleszinski, former design director at Epic Games, who was then looking for a different musical sound for the Unreal franchise, played his demo reel. This led him to work on Unreal Tournament 2003, Unreal Tournament 2004 and Unreal Championship 2. In February 2005, Riepl became attached to Gears of War. Initially, he was asked to write the main themes for the game, but after submitting the pieces he had written, Epic liked what he created and signed him on to create the entire score. In March 2007, Riepl recorded the score for the massively multiplayer first-person shooter computer game Huxley, developed by Webzen Games.

In October 2010, Riepl suffered a sudden heart failure and was hospitalized. He had a pump installed in his heart until a donor heart could replace it, and underwent the heart transplant in July 2011. Shortly afterwards, a rare tumor was found on his adrenal gland, which was affecting his blood pressure. He has since made a good recovery.

In addition to his work on the video game industry, Riepl has composed for films and television series, including his recent scores for horror films such as Silent Night, Contracted and the Cabin Fever films (Patient Zero and the 2016 film remake).

== Credits ==
Kevin Riepl has composed music for the following media:

=== Video games ===
Year	Title	Developer	Notes
2001	Twisted Metal: Black	Incognito Entertainment	Additional music (uncredited)
2002	New Legends	Infinite Machine	Additional music
2002	Dead to Rights	Namco	Additional music
2002	Unreal Tournament 2003	Epic Games	—N/a
2002	Nancy Drew: Secret of the Scarlet Hand	Her Interactive	Additional music
2002	Nancy Drew: Ghost Dogs of Moon Lake	Her Interactive	Additional music
2003	Nancy Drew: The Haunted Carousel	Her Interactive	Additional music
2004	Pitfall: The Lost Expedition	Edge of Reality; Torus Games; Beenox	Additional music
2004	Unreal Tournament 2004	Epic Games	—N/a
2004	Shrek 2: The Game	KnowWonder	—N/a
2004	Nicktoons: Movin'	Mass Media	—N/a
2005	Unreal Championship 2	Epic Games	—N/a
2005	Shrek SuperSlam	7 Studios	—N/a
2005	The Bible Game	Mass Media	Credited in-game with Original Music Composition
2005	City of Villains	Cryptic Studios	—N/a
2006	Gears of War	Epic Games	—N/a
2007	Huxley	Webzen Games Inc.	—N/a
2007	Unreal Tournament 3	Epic Games	—N/a
2007	Soul of the Ultimate Nation	Webzen Games Inc.	—N/a
2008	Gears of War 2	Epic Games	Additional music
2010	Crackdown 2	Ruffian Games	—N/a
2011	Hunted: The Demon's Forge	inXile Entertainment	—N/a
2012	Resistance: Burning Skies	Nihilistic Software	—N/a
2012	Borderlands 2: Mr. Torgue's Campaign of Carnage	Gearbox Software	—N/a
2013	Aliens: Colonial Marines	Gearbox Software	Themes by James Horner and Jerry Goldsmith
2013	Ascend: Hand of Kul	Signal Studios	—N/a
2014	Vlad The Impaler	Section Studios	—N/a
2015	Toy Soldiers: War Chest	Signal Studios	—N/a
2015	Nosgoth	Psyonix	—N/a
2015	Rocket League	Psyonix	—N/a
2016	Battleborn	Gearbox Software	—N/a
TBA	Unreal Tournament	Epic Games	—N/a
TBA	Bedlam	Skyshine Games	—N/a

=== Films ===
Year	Title	Director	Notes
2004	Look	Eric Blue	—N/a
2005	Sky High	Mike Mitchell	Credited as music programmer
2007	Lost Crossing	Eric Blue	—N/a
2007	Rogue 379	Douglas Choi	—N/a
2008	Lost Boys: The Tribe	P.J. Pesce	—N/a
2009	Broken August	Marc Pilvinsky	—N/a
2009	New Hope Manor	Danny LeGare	—N/a
2010	Clemency	Joseph Albanese	—N/a
2010	Broken Moment	Eric Blue	—N/a
2010	Breathe	Danny LeGare	—N/a
2011	Mama's Baby	Drew Daywalt	—N/a
2011	Ruin	Wes Ball	—N/a
2012	HENRi	Eli Sasich	—N/a
2012	The Aggression Scale	Steven C. Miller	—N/a
2012	Dead Shadows	David Cholewa	—N/a
2012	The ABCs of Death	Kaare Andrews	—N/a
2012	Silent Night	Steven C. Miller	—N/a
2013	Contracted	Eric England	—N/a
2014	Cabin Fever: Patient Zero	Kaare Andrews	—N/a
2014	Resignation	Joshua Caldwell	—N/a
2014	The Night Crew	Christian Sesma	—N/a
2014	Criminal	Denzel Whitaker	—N/a
2014	Beacon Point	Eric Blue	—N/a
2015	Batman Unlimited: Animal Instincts	Butch Lukic	—N/a
2015	Grandpa's Psycho	Danny LeGare	Credited as music supervisor
2015	Vigilante Diaries	Christian Sesma	—N/a
2015	Batman Unlimited: Monster Mayhem	Butch Lukic	—N/a
2016	Cabin Fever	Travis Z	—N/a
2016	Get The Girl	Eric England	—N/a
2016	Batman Unlimited: Mech vs. Mutants	Curt Ceda	—N/a
2018	Higher Power	Matthew Charles Santoro	—N/a
2018	Constantine: City of Demons – The Movie	Doug Murphy	—N/a
2019	Batman vs. Teenage Mutant Ninja Turtles	Jake Castorena	—N/a
2019	Greenlight	Graham Denman	—N/a
2019	Pureza	Renato Barbieri	—N/a
2020	Deathstroke: Knights & Dragons: The Movie	Sung Jin Ahn	—N/a
2020	Superman: Man of Tomorrow	Chris Palmer	—N/a
2021	Justice Society: World War II	Jeff Wamester	—N/a
2022	Green Lantern: Beware My Power	Jeff Wamester	—N/a
2023	Legion of Super-Heroes	Jeff Wamester	—N/a
2024	Justice League: Crisis on Infinite Earths	Jeff Wamester	—N/a
2025	Under Fire	Steven C. Miller	—N/a

=== Television ===
Year	Title	Notes
2001–2006	Invader Zim	Additional music
2003–2006	Xiaolin Showdown	Additional music
2004–2006	Brandy & Mr. Whiskers	Co-composer
2005–2006	Johnny Test	Main Title Composer / Add. Music
2006–2007	Six Degrees	Orchestration / Score Prep.
2016–2018	Justice League Action	—N/a
