= Toy soldier (disambiguation) =

A toy soldier is a miniature figurine that represents a soldier.

Toy soldier(s) may also refer to:

== Literature ==
- Toy Soldiers (novel), a novel by Paul Leonard based on the Dr. Who science fiction television series
- Toy Soldier (comics), a Marvel Comics character

== Film ==
- Toy Soldiers (1984 film), an action film in which students vacationing in Central America are held hostage by terrorists
- Toy Soldiers (1991 film), an action/drama film in which terrorists take a school hostage
- Toy Soldiers (2010 film), a British documentary film
- The Toy Soldiers, a 2014 American drama film

== Television ==
- "Toy Soldiers", an episode of the science fiction television show Space: Above and Beyond
- "Toy Soldiers", an episode of Painkiller Jane
- "The Toy Soldier", an episode of Bonanza

== Games ==
- Toy Soldiers (video game), an action-strategy video game by Signal Studios released on Xbox Live Arcade in 2010
  - Toy Soldiers: Cold War, a 2012 multiplayer action-strategy video game sequel to Toy Soldiers
  - Toy Soldiers: War Chest, the third video game of the series.

== Music ==
- Toy Soldiers (band), an indie rock band from Philadelphia, Pennsylvania
- "Toy Soldier", a term given to members of the Army of Toy Soldiers (formerly the fan club of musician Dr. Steel)

=== Songs ===
- "Toy Soldiers" (song), a 1988 song by Martika
  - "Like Toy Soldiers", a 2004 Eminem song that sampled Martika's song
- "Toy Soldier", a single by Frankie Valli & the Four Seasons, Crewe and Gaudio The Four Seasons discography, 1965
- "Toy Soldier", a Britney Spears song featured on her 2007 studio album, Blackout
- "My Toy Soldier", a 50 Cent song from his 2005 studio album, The Massacre

== See also ==
- Mini soldier (disambiguation)
- Tin soldier (disambiguation)
