= List of games which support Xbox SmartGlass =

The Xbox app (also known as Xbox SmartGlass) is an application for the Xbox consoles. Some games developed for Microsoft's Xbox 360 and Xbox One are compatible with the SmartGlass application. SmartGlass is also compatible with some applications and multimedia content produced for the consoles.

== Xbox 360 Games ==
Title	Developer	Publisher	North America	Europe	Japan	Console exclusive to Xbox 360	Kinect
A World of Keflings	NinjaBee	Microsoft Studios	December 22, 2010	December 22, 2010	December 22, 2010	Yes	No
Ascend: Hand of Kul	Microsoft Studios	Microsoft Studios	September 25, 2013	September 25, 2013	September 25, 2013	Yes	No
Castle Crashers	The Behemoth	Microsoft Game Studios	August 27, 2008			No	No
Dance Central 3	Harmonix Music	Harmonix Music	October 16, 2012	October 19, 2012	October 18, 2012	Yes	Required
Dust: An Elysian Tail	Humble Hearts	Microsoft Studios	August 15, 2012	August 15, 2012	August 15, 2012	Yes	No
Deus Ex: Human Revolution - Director's Cut	Eidos Montréal	Square Enix	October 22, 2013	October 22, 2013	October 22, 2013	No	No
Fable Anniversary	Lionhead Studios	Microsoft Studios	February 4, 2014	February 7, 2014	February 6, 2014	Yes	No
Forza Horizon	Playground Games, Turn 10 Studios	Microsoft Studios	October 23, 2012	October 26, 2012	October 25, 2012	Yes	Supported
Full House Poker	Krome Studios	Microsoft Game Studios	March 16, 2011			Yes	No
Halo 4	343 Industries	Microsoft Studios	November 6, 2012	November 6, 2012	November 8, 2012	Yes	No
Happy Wars	Toylogic	Microsoft Studios	October 12, 2012			Yes	No
Home Run Stars	Smoking Gun Interactive	Microsoft Studios	October 26, 2012	October 26, 2012	October 26, 2012	Yes	Required
Just Dance 2014	Ubisoft	Ubisoft	October 8, 2013	October 1, 2013	N/A	No	Required
Kinect Sesame Street TV	Soho Productions	Microsoft Studios	September 18, 2012	September 18, 2012	N/A	Yes	Required
Madden NFL 13	EA Tiburon	EA Sports	Never Implemented	Never Implemented	N/A	No	Required
Magic: The Gathering – Duels of the Planeswalkers 2013	Stainless Games	Wizards of the Coast	June 20, 2012			No	No
Mark of the Ninja	Klei Entertainment	Microsoft Studios	September 7, 2012	September 7, 2012	September 7, 2012	Yes	No
Metal Gear Solid V: Ground Zeroes	Kojima Productions	Konami	March 18, 2014	March 20, 2014	March 20, 2014	No	No
Ninja Gaiden 3: Razor's Edge	Team Ninja	Tecmo Koei	April 2, 2013	April 5, 2013	April 4, 2013	No	No
Pinball FX 2	Zen Studios	Microsoft Game Studios	October 27, 2010			Yes	No
Toy Soldiers: Cold War	Signal Studios	Microsoft Studios	August 17, 2011			No	Yes
Trials Evolution	RedLynx	Microsoft Studios	April 18, 2012			Yes	No

== Xbox One Games ==
Title	Developer	Publisher	North America	Europe	Australia	Exclusive to Xbox One	Kinect
Dead Rising 3	Capcom Vancouver	Microsoft Studios	November 22, 2013	November 22, 2013	November 22, 2013	No	Supported
Forza Motorsport 5	Turn 10 Studios	Microsoft Studios	November 22, 2013	November 22, 2013	November 22, 2013	Yes	Supported
Just Dance 2014	Ubisoft	Ubisoft	November 22, 2013	November 22, 2013	November 22, 2013	No	Required
Kinect Sports Rivals	Rare	Microsoft Studios	April 8, 2014	April 11, 2014	April 8, 2014	Yes	Required
LocoCycle	Twisted Pixel Games	Microsoft Studios	November 22, 2013	November 22, 2013	November 22, 2013	Yes	Required
Plants vs. Zombies: Garden Warfare	PopCap Games	Electronic Arts	February 25, 2014	February 27, 2014	TBA	No	Supported
Ryse: Son of Rome	Crytek	Microsoft Studios	November 22, 2013	November 22, 2013	November 22, 2013	No	Supported
Warframe	Digital Extremes	Digital Extremes	September 2, 2014	September 9, 2014	September 2, 2014	No	No
Worms Battlegrounds	Team17	Team17	June 3, 2014	May 30, 2014	TBA	No	No

== Xbox 360 Applications ==
Applications	Release date	Available countries
ESPN on Xbox LIVE (ESPN)	December 6, 2011	United States
HBO GO (HBO)	March 27, 2012	United States
Internet Explorer	October 16, 2012	Available in all countries
Karaoke	December 11, 2012	Available in all countries (except Japan and United Arab Emirates)
MSN	December 13, 2011	Canada, France, Germany, Italy, Mexico, United Kingdom, United States
NBC News	August 21, 2012	United States
Now TV	August 21, 2012	United Kingdom
Sports Picks	December 14, 2012	Available in all countries
TODAY (MSNBC)	December 6, 2011	United States
UFC on Xbox LIVE (UFC)	December 20, 2011	Canada, United States
UVideos (Univision)	November 21, 2012	United States
Xbox Music	October 16, 2012	Available in all countries
Xbox Video	October 16, 2012	Available in all countries

== Xbox One Applications ==
Applications	Release date	Available countries
Miss Universe	2014	Canada, Mexico, United States
NFL on Xbox	November 22, 2013	Canada, Mexico, United States
Skype	November 22, 2013	Available in all countries

== Live events ==
Events	Date	Available countries
2012 United States Election Day coverage	November 6, 2012	United States
2012 Spike Video Game Awards	December 7, 2012	Available in 14 countries globally
85th Academy Awards Red Carpet Pre-Show	February 24, 2013	United States
2013 Revolver Golden Gods	May 2, 2013	Argentina, Australia, Brazil, Canada, Chile, Colombia, France, Germany, Italy, Mexico, Spain, United Kingdom, United States
Miss Teen USA 2013	August 10, 2013	Argentina, Australia, Brazil, Canada, Chile, Colombia, France, Germany, Hong Kong, India, Italy, Japan, Korea, Mexico, Singapore, Spain, Taiwan, United Kingdom, United States
2014 Revolver Golden Gods	April 25, 2014	Australia, Canada, United Kingdom, United States
Miss Teen USA 2014	August 2, 2014	Argentina, Australia, Brazil, Canada, Chile, Colombia, France, Germany, Israel, Italy, Mexico, Spain, United Kingdom, United States

== Movies ==
Movies	Availability
21 Jump Street	Yes
50/50	Yes
American Reunion	Yes
Arbitrage	Yes
Batman Begins	Yes
Battleship	No
Bernie	Yes
Friends with Kids	Yes
John Carter	Yes
Journey 2: The Mysterious Island	Yes
Land of the Lost	Yes
Machine Gun Preacher	Yes
Man on a Ledge	Yes
Mirror Mirror	Yes
Mission: Impossible – Ghost Protocol	Yes
One for the Money	Yes
Project X	Yes
Prometheus	Yes
Safe	Yes
Safe House	Yes
Seeking Justice	Yes
Sherlock Holmes: A Game of Shadows	Yes
The Avengers	Yes
The Babymakers	Yes
The Book of Eli	Yes
The Bourne Ultimatum	No
The Five-Year Engagement	Yes
The Hunger Games	Yes
The Lucky One	Yes
The Three Stooges	Yes
The Twilight Saga: Breaking Dawn - Part 1	Yes
The Vow	Yes
This Is the End	Yes
This Means War	Yes
We Bought a Zoo	Yes
Wrath of the Titans	Yes
