= Super Mystery =

Children's mystery book series

Super Mystery is a 36-volume series of crossover paperbacks, pairing The Hardy Boys with Nancy Drew. Earlier crossovers include a 1970s TV series, the novelization of one of the TV episodes (The Hardy Boys and Nancy Drew Meet Dracula), two SuperSleuths books (each book containing 7 short stories), Campfire Stories (a book of 7 short stories in celebration of the anniversary of the Campfire organization), and the Be-A-Detective series (6 choose-your-own adventure books).

The series is based on the Nancy Drew Files and the Hardy Boys Casefiles universes, as evidenced by Shock Waves, in which the melted keys from the car bombing that killed Iola Morton in the first Hardy Boys Casefile, are mentioned. The books are written under the Keene pseudonym and are told mainly from Nancy's view. Since 2007, and the re-introduction of the Nancy Drew and the Hardy Boys Super Mystery series based on the "Nancy Drew: Girl Detective" series, many fans have referred to this original crossover series as SuperMystery'88 in order to differentiate the two series.

An attraction between Frank Hardy and Nancy Drew was mentioned throughout the series.

== Series titles ==
Titles and publication dates
#	Title	Released	Author
1	Double Crossing	June 1988	
2	A Crime for Christmas	November 1988	Peter Lerangis
3	Shock Waves	April 1989	Peter Lerangis
4	Dangerous Games	August 1989	
5	The Last Resort	November 1989	
6	The Paris Connection	April 1990	
7	Buried in Time	August 1990	Peter Lerangis & Larry Mike
8	Mystery Train	November 1990	
9	Best of Enemies	April 1991	
10	High Survival	August 1991	
11	New Year's Evil	November 1991	
12	Tour of Danger	April 1992	
13	Spies and Lies	July 1992	Tracey West
14	Tropic of Fear	November 1992	
15	Courting Disaster	April 1993	
16	Hits and Misses	July 1993	
17	Evil in Amsterdam	November 1993	
18	Desperate Measures	March 1994	
19	Passport to Danger	July 1994	
20	Hollywood Horror	October 1994	
21	Copper Canyon Conspiracy	December 1994	Robin Hardy
22	Danger Down Under	March 1995	
23	Dead on Arrival	May 1995	
24	Target for Terror	August 1995	
25	Secrets of the Nile	November 1995	
26	A Question of Guilt	March 1996	
27	Islands of Intrigue	May 1996	
28	Murder on the Fourth of July	July 1996	
29	High Stakes	November 1996	
30	Nightmare in New Orleans	March 1997	
31	Out of Control	June 1997	
32	Exhibition of Evil	August 1997	
33	At All Costs	October 1997	
34	Royal Revenge	December 1997	
35	Operation Titanic	February 1998	
36	Process of Elimination	April 1998	C.J. Henderson

In additions to the titles listed above, two unpublished manuscripts were written. Book #37 was written by Louise Munro Foley and had the working title The Playhouse Mystery. Book #38 was untitled, but listed as forthcoming on an on-line book sales site.

== See also ==
- List of Nancy Drew books
