= Nancy Drew: Secrets Can Kill =

1998 video game

- Developer: HeR Interactive
- Publisher: DreamCatcher Games
- Series: Nancy Drew
- Platform: Microsoft Windows
- Release: November 23, 1998
- Genres: Adventure; Puzzle
- Mode: Single player

Secrets Can Kill is the first installment in the Nancy Drew point-and-click adventure game series, released on November 23, 1998 by HeR Interactive. Players take on the first-person view of fictional amateur sleuth Nancy Drew and solve the mystery through interrogation of suspects, solving puzzles, and discovering clues. The game features pre-rendered 3D environments, but unlike later games, the characters are animated in 2D. There are three levels of gameplay: Junior, Senior, and Master detective modes. Each mode offers a different difficulty level of puzzles and hints, however, none of these changes affect the actual plot of the game. The game is loosely based on a Nancy Drew Files book of the same name, Secrets Can Kill (1986).

An enhanced remake of the game, subtitled Remastered, was released on August 24, 2010. Sales of the original Secrets Can Kill were discontinued on August 1, 2010.

== Plot ==
Nancy Drew takes a semester off of school to visit her Aunt Eloise in Florida. A student named Jake Rogers is murdered at the local high school, where Eloise works as a librarian. Eloise asks Nancy to investigate, so Nancy goes undercover as a new student and attempts to solve the mystery. Throughout the game, Nancy discovers that Jake Rogers was blackmailing several of the other characters by videotaping their misdeeds:

- Hal Tanaka took on additional coursework to be approved for a scholarship. He knew that if he didn't get the scholarship, his family would send him back to Japan. He slowly became overwhelmed and buried in work, so he decided to plagiarize an English essay from a school library book, which Jake caught on camera. Jake blackmailed Hal into doing his homework for the remainder of the semester, otherwise Jake would reveal the plagiarism to Hal's family.
- Connie Watson was struggling to get enough money for college tuition, so she decided to use her Judo expertise to compete secretly in a men's tournament (the prize money was significantly better than the women's tournament), which Connie easily won. Jake caught her removing her mask on camera and subsequently forced her to date him.
- Hulk Sanchez was badly injured while playing football, so to continue playing and impress the college scouts, he decided to break into the local pharmaceutical plant to steal some steroids. After filming Hulk leaving the plant, Jake forces him to be his lackey.
- Daryl Gray's father was former U.S. senator Eugene Gray, who went bankrupt after some poor business deals. Daryl got involved in a drug smuggling deal with Mitch Dillon. Jake caught video footage of the transaction and thus demanded a cut of the profits that Daryl was receiving.
- Mitch Dillon was running a drug transport ring from the local pharmaceutical plant. When Jake caught video footage of a transaction between him and Daryl Gray, he attempted to blackmail Mitch.

Upon talking to Daryl, Nancy realizes that it was Mitch who killed Jake and Daryl tells Nancy to stay away from him and the case. Nancy however has a plan to get Mitch arrested with Daryl and Connie’s help, together the two can hold Mitch off long enough until the cops arrive and arrest him. With Jake’s killer behind bars, everyone resumes their normal lives while Nancy goes to New York City to solve the mysterious death threats of a rising star named Rick Arlen which leads to the events of the next game.

== Development ==
=== Characters ===
- Nancy Drew - Nancy is an 18-year-old amateur detective from the fictional town of River Heights in the United States. She is the only playable character in the game, which means the player must solve the mystery from her perspective.
- Daryl Gray – Daryl is the one who found the victim's body. He works part-time as a short-order cook at Maxine's Diner, and he is the school's student council president (taking the position after his father who was a Florida state senator). He is known as a rich, popular, pretty boy who drives a Porsche 911. He tends to be a bit of a flirt, but is he as wholesome as he seems?
- Connie Watson – Connie is a strong girl with an attitude and a dark secret. The player can always find her in the Student Lounge. She seems like a nice normal, if not tough, teenage girl... or is she?
- Hal Tanaka – Hal is a foreign exchange student from Japan. He's very focused on getting a scholarship to go to college and become a doctor. He is always in the study dome at the school. He seems intelligent, but is he smart enough to plan the death of the devious blackmailer known as Jake Rogers?
- Hector "Hulk" Sanchez – Hulk Sanchez is a stereotypical jock who hopes to play college football, and then go on to play for the Miami Dolphins. However, Hulk needs an athletic scholarship to reach that dream. Are his plans as stable as he says?
- Mitch Dillon – Mitch is the school's boiler serviceman and is not seen much in the game. He's as shady as they come.... did Jake get mixed up with him?

=== Cast ===
- Nancy Drew - Lani Minella
- Hal Tanaka - John Truong
- Hector 'Hulk' Sanchez - Rick Calvert
- Daryl Gray - Bill Corkery
- Mitch Dillon - Kenton Leach
- Connie Watson - Donna Rowry

== Release ==
Released on November 23, 1998, Secrets Can Kill was one of the first mystery computer games to be released that targeted the young female demographic.

=== Reception ===
In 2001, Secrets Can Kill sold 28,050 units in North America, according to PC Data. Its jewel case re-release sold 41,455 copies in the region during 2003. In the United States alone, the game's computer version sold between 100,000 and 300,000 units by August, 2006. Combined sales of the Nancy Drew adventure game series reached 500,000 copies in North America by early 2003, and the computer entries reached 2.1 million sales in the United States alone by August 2006. Remarking upon this success, Edge called Nancy Drew a "powerful franchise".

Critical reception for Nancy Drew: Secrets Can Kill has been mixed. The Washington Post panned Secrets Can Kill, criticizing it for not giving the player a good sense of the character of Nancy Drew and stating "this sanitized game could get old pretty quick; I'd stick with the books". Adventure Gamers gave the game two stars. The New York Times has dubbed the game the "Un-Barbie of computer games". The Sun Sentinel praised the game, writing "Nancy Drew: Secrets Can Kill is a wonderful game for readers of Nancy Drew mysteries and even past readers. It helps bring the characters alive, while injecting a bit of the player into the role." Millie Benson, a journalist who wrote many of the original Nancy Drew mysteries under the Carolyn Keene pseudonym, praised the game in the Toledo Blade, commending it for "retain(ing) the flavor of the early Nancy Drew books" and for the developers' 'care in developing scenes and characters.'"

=== Remake ===
Cover art for Secrets Can Kill Remastered

Secrets Can Kill was officially discontinued on August 1, 2010 due to compatibility issues with sound cards in newer computers. On August 24, 2010, HeR Interactive released a remastered version of Secrets Can Kill with a new ending and pre-rendered 3D characters.

Common Sense Media reviewed the remastered game and gave it a favorable review, rating it five stars.

| Preceded by None | Nancy Drew Computer Games | Succeeded by Nancy Drew: Stay Tuned for Danger |
