= Nancy Drew: The Final Scene =

2001 video game

- Developer: Her Interactive
- Publisher: DreamCatcher
- Director: Max Holechek
- Producers: Erin Brown; Janet Sairs
- Designer: Wayne Sikes
- Artist: Max Holechek
- Writers: Erin Brown; Max Holechek
- Composer: Kevin Manthei
- Series: Nancy Drew
- Platform: Windows
- Release: NA: November 12, 2001
- Genres: Adventure; Puzzle
- Mode: Single player

The Final Scene is the fifth installment in the Nancy Drew point-and-click adventure game series by Her Interactive. The game is available for play on Microsoft Windows platforms. Players take on the first-person view of fictional amateur sleuth Nancy Drew and must solve the mystery through interrogation of suspects, solving puzzles, and discovering clues. There are two levels of gameplay, including a Junior and Senior detective mode. Each mode offers a different difficulty level of puzzles and hints, but neither of these changes affect the actual plot of the game. The game is loosely based on a book of the same name, The Final Scene (1989).

== Plot ==
Nancy Drew and her friend Maya Nguyen are at the Royal Palladium theater in St. Louis for the premiere of a new movie, Vanishing Destiny. The historic theater, which once featured performers such as Harry Houdini in the 1920s, is set to be demolished in three days despite intense opposition from local activist groups. Maya is planning to interview the star of the film, Brady Armstrong, for her college's newspaper, but as Maya goes into his dressing room at the theater, she is kidnapped.

Nancy enters the dressing room after hearing Maya's screams, but no one is there. She picks up a ringing phone and hears a warped voice threatening to kill Maya if the theater is demolished as planned. Nancy attempts to call back but instead reaches Joseph Hughes, the theater's caretaker, who says that the previous call must have come from inside the building. Brady enters the dressing room, and when Nancy informs him of the kidnapping, he blames the "radicals" who are actively opposing the theater's demolition.

In another dressing room Nancy meets Simone Mueller, Brady's agent, who is too preoccupied with the film premiere to care about the kidnapping. She then meets Nicholas Falcone, the leader of Humans Against the Destruction of Illustrious Theaters ("HAD IT"), an activist group opposing the demolition. He is pleased to hear of Maya's kidnapping as he thinks it will help his cause and does not believe any harm will come to Maya.

Nancy finds out that the Royal Palladium's original owner, J.J. Thompson (whose descendant is planning the present-day demolition), was low on funds in the theater's early days. In 1925 he challenged Harry Houdini to escape from a "watery grave," a feat that Thompson mistakenly did not believe Houdini would achieve, and was unable to pay him the agreed-upon monetary reward, instead giving him a 50% ownership stake in the theater. Nicholas's great-grandmother, Louisa Falcone, designed parts of the theater but was never paid by Thompson for her work, which has further intensified his opposition to the demolition. Nancy meets Joseph in person, and he expresses concern about the kidnapping and theorizes that Maya is being held somewhere in the building.

The next day, a funeral wreath is delivered to the theater with a note threatening Maya's life if the demolition proceeds. Nancy discovers that Simone has indefinitely postponed the movie premiere, contacted the press, and distributed flyers about the kidnapping in order to raise publicity for Brady and the film. While exploring secret passageways in the theater, Nancy glimpses Maya from above a hidden room below the stage, but by the time Nancy is able to gain entry into the room, Maya is gone.

On the day of the proposed demolition, Nancy learns that a warped voice called the police from a different town demanding $50,000 for Maya's return; the police, who have searched the entire theater, no longer believe Maya is in the building. Nancy finds evidence that Simone sent the funeral wreath to the theater the previous day, and Simone confesses to this but maintains she did not kidnap Maya. Brady admits to Nancy that his real last name is Thompson, not Armstrong, and that he is the great nephew of J.J. Thompson; he arranged for the demolition so he can replace the theater with something more in line with his preferred public image, and he was worried Maya's interview would provide negative publicity, although insists that he did not kidnap her.

While construction workers are performing the final sweep of the building before demolition (believing no one is inside), Nancy tracks down evidence that Harry Houdini transferred his 50% ownership stake in the theater to Louisa Falcone, having discovered her and wanting to help a young female artist. Nancy is confronted by Joseph, who admits to kidnapping Maya in an attempt to save the theater where he has been working for decades and cannot imagine his life without, and is now determined to let himself, Nancy, and Maya be killed in the demolition. Nancy apprehends Joseph and turns on the theater's marquee to indicate they are inside, and the demolition is stopped. Nancy learns that Joseph had intended to kidnap Brady and use the publicity to save the theater, but when Maya entered the dressing room he panicked and took her instead. Joseph is arrested, Nicholas learns that he owns 50% of the theater as Louisa Falcone's heir, and Brady donates his 50% to the St. Louis Historical Society so the theater can be preserved.

== Development ==
=== Characters ===
- Nancy Drew - Nancy is an 18-year-old amateur detective from the fictional town of River Heights in the United States. She is the only playable character in the game, which means the player must solve the mystery from her perspective.
- Brady Armstrong - Brady is the star of the movie Vanishing Destiny that Maya intended to interview before she was kidnapped from his dressing room. Brady's life and appearance are often under the control of his agent Simone. Is Brady worried that his show might not go on after the theater has been demolished?
- Simone Mueller - Simone is Brady's self-centered agent who is always on the phone in the women's dressing room. When Maya disappears, she decides to cancel the Vanishing Destiny premiere because she thinks Maya's kidnapping is a great opportunity to drum up more press. Could she have set up the kidnapping as a publicity stunt for Brady?
- Joseph Hughes - Joseph is the caretaker of the theater who works in the projector room. He is very open and friendly. Joseph has worked at the Royal Palladium his entire life and is deeply connected to it, but he acts as though he is fine with the demolition. How far would he go to save his beloved theater?
- Nicholas Falcone - Nicholas is the leader of "H.A.D I.T" or "Humans Against the Destruction of Illustrious Theaters". They are leading a protest against the demolition of the theater. He acts as if he's innocent and only wants to help, but the police say that he has previously faked a kidnapping to save a theater. Would kidnapping Maya be a means to his end?

=== Cast ===
- Nancy Drew - Lani Minella
- Brady Armstrong / The Amazing Monty - David S. Hogan
- Nicholas Falcone / Construction Worker - Max Holechek (as Alan Smythe)
- Joseph Hughes / Sergeant Mac Ramsey - Bob Heath
- Simone Mueller / Madeline - Keri Healey
- Eustacia Andropov - Alena Saunders
- Ned Nickerson / Sherman Trout - Scott Carty
- Bess Marvin - Punchy LaRue
- George Fayne - Maureen Nelson

== Reception ==
According to PC Data, The Final Scene sold 23,557 units in North America during 2001, and another 15,947 units in the first three months of 2002. Its sales in the region for the year 2003 totaled 38,064 units. In the United States alone, the game's computer version sold between 100,000 and 300,000 units by August 2006. Combined sales of the Nancy Drew adventure game series reached 500,000 copies in North America by early 2003, and the computer entries reached 2.1 million sales in the United States alone by August 2006. Remarking upon this success, Edge called Nancy Drew a "powerful franchise".

Charles Herold of The New York Times declared The Final Scene one of the best games of 2001. Praising its characters, he wrote that the game "sticks to the [Nancy Drew] formula but refines and improves it, adding a little suspense, more interesting suspects and sharper dialogue." The Final Scene also received a "Gold" Parents' Choice Award in summer 2002.

Preceded by Nancy Drew: Treasure in the Royal Tower	Nancy Drew Computer Games	Succeeded by Nancy Drew: Secret of the Scarlet Hand
