= Nancy Drew: Stay Tuned for Danger =

1999 video game

- Developer: HeR Interactive
- Publisher: DreamCatcher
- Producers: Denise Roberts McKee; Janet Sairs
- Designer: Wayne Sikes
- Artist: Laura Henion
- Writer: Robert Riedl
- Composer: Kevin Manthei
- Series: Nancy Drew
- Platform: PC
- Release: November 13, 1999
- Genres: Adventure; Puzzle
- Mode: Single-player

Stay Tuned for Danger is the second installment in the Nancy Drew point-and-click adventure game series by HeR Interactive. It was officially discontinued in 2011 before being re-released in 2016 after the company had transferred to their new gaming system.

Players take on the first-person view of fictional amateur sleuth Nancy Drew and solve the mystery through interrogation of suspects, solving puzzles, and discovering clues. It features longer gameplay compared to the previous game, Secrets Can Kill. It is the first installment in the series to feature pre-rendered 3D character models. There are three levels of gameplay: Junior, Senior, and Master detective modes. Each mode offers a different difficulty level of puzzles and hints, but none of these changes affect the plot of the game. It is loosely based on the 1987 book of the same name.

== Plot ==
Nancy Drew is invited to New York City to stay with Mattie Jensen, a popular soap opera star. Mattie wants Nancy to investigate death threats that her costar, Rick Arlen, has been receiving. Throughout the game, Nancy discovers each character has a motive for threatening Rick:

- Millie Strathorn, the eccentric owner of Worldwide Broadcasting (WWB) Studios who sometimes conflates fiction with reality, believes that everything happening on the show was real. Because she hated Rick's character, she hated Rick, so she submitted storylines that killed him off to the show's writers. However, they never included any of her stories in it.
- Mattie Jensen used to date Rick, but he dumped her in order to date Lillian. She then went on to date her agent, Dwayne Powers.
- Lillian Weiss dated Rick for a short period of time. She felt that he was only using her to advance his career, so she sent some bitter threats to him, including poisoned chocolates and an angry love poem. However, when he started to receive additional threats, she began to investigate.
- William Pappas was afraid that Rick leaving the show would cause low ratings and potential cancellation. He was also furious that Rick reneged on his contract.
- Dwayne Powers was jealous of Rick's success as an actor and the fact that Mattie still cared for him.
- Rick Arlen wanted to move out to Hollywood, Los Angeles to pursue work in films, but because of his reputation with the ladies and his disloyalty with his contract, he was causing people to gossip.

Between near-death accidents on set and backstage, Nancy soon discovers security footage that shows Dwayne Powers at the studio after hours. Nancy heads for the studio and runs into Lillian. Suddenly, the power is cut, and Dwayne Powers is revealed to be the culprit. Nancy is able to alert security, and Dwayne is arrested. Lillian moves on and becomes a director. Rick and Mattie get married.

== Development ==
The Toledo Blade reported that the game was in development in an issue released on April 3, 1999.

== Release ==
The game was originally discontinued on November 17, 2011 due to incompatibility issues with sound cards in newer computers. Although HeR Interactive released a remastered version of its first game Nancy Drew: Secrets Can Kill, they have not announced plans to remaster any other older games, including Stay Tuned for Danger.

In 2016, HeR Interactive made the original Stay Tuned for Danger available again through digital download, along with tips and tutorials for getting it to work with more modern Windows systems.

== Reception ==
Reception

Review scores
Publication	Score
Adventure Gamers	3.5/5
Just Adventure	B

During the year 2001, Stay Tuned for Danger sold 20,826 units in North America, according to PC Data. Its jewel case re-release sold 47,179 copies in the region during 2003. In the United States alone, the game's computer version sold between 100,000 and 300,000 units by August, 2006. Combined sales of the Nancy Drew adventure game series reached 500,000 copies in North America by early 2003, and the computer entries reached 2.1 million sales in the United States alone by August 2006. Remarking upon this success, Edge called Nancy Drew a "powerful franchise".

New Straits Times wrote that while the game "had a certain voyeuristic charm", it "suffered from some of the most contrived puzzles ever put in an adventure game."

Stay Tuned for Danger received a "Gold" Parents' Choice Award in spring 2000.

Preceded by Nancy Drew: Secrets Can Kill	Nancy Drew Computer Games	Succeeded by Nancy Drew: Message in a Haunted Mansion
