= Toy Soldiers: War Chest =

2015 video game

- Developer: Signal Studios
- Publisher: Ubisoft
- Composer: Kevin Riepl
- Platforms: Microsoft Windows; PlayStation 4 Xbox One
- Release: PlayStation 4, Xbox One: WW: August 11, 2015; PAL: August 18, 2015 (PS4); Windows; August 12, 2015
- Genres: Action, strategy
- Modes: Single-player, multiplayer

Toy Soldiers: War Chest is an action/strategy video game developed by Signal Studios and published by Ubisoft. The game was released in August 2015 for Microsoft Windows, PlayStation 4 and Xbox One.

War Chest is the first title in the series not to be a Microsoft console exclusive.

== Gameplay ==
Toy Soldiers: War Chest is similar to the previous games where players prevent enemy units from reaching the toybox by building and upgrading turrets. In War Chest, turrets can be improved by upgrading armor, fire rate and damage separately. The enemy AI is improved as well. For example, destroying a bridge will cause ground units to take a different path to the toybox. Certain units have the ability to heal nearby units and some will focus on destroying any placed turrets.

Barrages and playable units from Toy Soldiers: Cold War return with a few changes. Instead of earning killstreaks or destroying a specially marked enemy unit, the game uses a bar that fills up when killing enemy units. When the bar is filled to a certain amount, a special ability can used to call in barrages or spawn a hero unit such as a zeppelin that performs a bombing run.

The game features 4 highly customizable armies (8 in Hall of Fame Edition). Players can choose which turrets to deploy, barrages and modify the hero's arsenal. As the game progresses, new customization options will become available

== Release ==
War Chest comes in two versions: Standard and Hall of Fame Edition. The Standard version is digital while the Hall of Fame Edition is available on disc except for the PC version which is all digital. The standard version features four playable armies; in addition to Kaiser from the original game, War Chest includes three new original armies, namely Phantom, StarBright and Dark Lord.

The Hall of Fame Edition features four additional licensed armies based on fictional characters. This includes Duke and Cobra Commander from G.I. Joe, Ezio Auditore da Firenze from Assassin's Creed and He-Man from Masters of the Universe. The characters can be purchased separately or as a bundle on the standard version.

== Reception ==
Reception

Aggregate score
| Aggregator | Score |
|---|---|
| Metacritic | (PS4) 62/100 (PC, XOne) 60/100 |

Review scores
| Publication | Score |
|---|---|
| 4Players | (PC) 79% (XOne) 77% |
| Destructoid | (XOne) 7.5/10 |
| GameRevolution | (PS4) 6/10 |
| GameSpot | (PS4) 5/10 |
| GameStar | (PC) 70% |
| HobbyConsolas | (XOne) 75% |
| PlayStation Official Magazine – UK | (PS4) 5/10 |
| Official Xbox Magazine (UK) | (XOne) 6/10 |
| PC Games (DE) | (PC) 68% |
| Push Square | (PS4) 4/10 |
| The Digital Fix | (XOne) 5/10 |
| National Post | (PS4) 7.5/10 |

The game received "mixed" reviews on all platforms according to the review aggregation website Metacritic.

National Post gave the PlayStation 4 version 7.5 out of 10, saying, "Even without multiplayer, though, there's a good 20-plus hours of action packed into this fun little childhood throwback – more than enough to keep strategy fans occupied until the end of the summer." However, The Digital Fix gave the Xbox One version five out of ten, calling it "a decent tower defence title but is severely hamstrung by poor performance, dodgy looks, a big old paywall to character content and some odd design decisions." Metro gave the same console version three out of ten, saying, "Mixing Tower Defense, third person action, and beloved '80s toys should've been a recipe for success, but this bland sequel doesn't do justice to any of its ideas."
