= New Gods (disambiguation) =

New Gods are a fictional extraterrestrial race featured in the DC Comics series The New Gods.

New Gods may also refer to:

- New Gods (album), an album and its title track by Withered Hand
- Ascend: Hand of Kul, formerly titled Ascend: New Gods, a 2013 video game
- "New Gods", a song by Grimes from the album Miss Anthropocene

== Film ==
- New Gods, canceled American film, see DC Extended Universe § Canceled and reworked projects
- New Gods: Nezha Reborn, 2021 Chinese film by Zhao Ji
- New Gods: Yang Jian, 2023 Chinese film by Zhao Ji
