= River Heights =

River Heights may refer to:

- River Heights, Utah, a city in Cache County, Utah
- River Heights (electoral district), a provincial electoral division in the Canadian province of Manitoba
- River Heights, Winnipeg, a neighborhood of Winnipeg, Manitoba in roughly the same area as the riding above
- River Heights, Saskatoon, an area of Saskatoon, Saskatchewan
- River Heights, Nancy Drew's fictional home town in Midwestern United States.
- River Heights (Nancy Drew), a spinoff series from the original Nancy Drew series
