= Double Crossing (disambiguation) =

Double Crossing is a Hardy Boys and Nancy Drew crossover novel.

Double Crossing may also refer to:

- Double Crossing, a 2001 Hong Kong film with Deric Wan
- Double Crossing, a 1983 novel by Erika Holzer
- Double Crossing: New and Selected Poems by Eva Salzman 2004

== See also ==
- Double Cross (disambiguation)
- "Double Crossing Blues," a 1950 song
