= Nancy Drew: Message in a Haunted Mansion =

2000 video game

- Developers: Her Interactive; Handheld Games (GBA)
- Publisher: DreamCatcher Interactive
- Producers: Denise Roberts McKee; Janet Sairs
- Designer: Wayne Sikes
- Artists: Laura Henion; Rick Eshbaugh
- Writers: Robert Riedl; Cate Riedl
- Composer: Kevin Manthei
- Series: Nancy Drew
- Platforms: Windows, Game Boy Advance
- Release: NA: November 24, 2000 (PC); NA: November 15, 2001 (GBA)
- Genres: Adventure; Puzzle
- Mode: Single player

Message in a Haunted Mansion is the third installment in the Nancy Drew point-and-click adventure game series by Her Interactive. The game is available for play on Microsoft Windows platforms as well as Game Boy Advance. Players take on the first-person view of fictional amateur sleuth Nancy Drew and must solve the mystery through interrogation of suspects, solving puzzles, and discovering clues. There are two levels of gameplay: Junior and Senior detective modes. Each mode offers a different difficulty level of puzzles and hints, but none of these changes affect the plot of the game. The game is loosely based on the book The Message in the Haunted Mansion (1995).

Message in a Haunted Mansion was a commercial success, with sales of 300,000 units and revenues of $5.5 million in the United States alone by August 2006. At the time, Edge named it the country's 64th-best-selling computer game of the 21st century.

== Plot ==
Nancy Drew is helping Rose Green, a friend of Nancy's housekeeper Hannah Gruen, with some renovation work in an old Victorian mansion in San Francisco that she is converting into a bed and breakfast. But, there are other uninvited guests, visitors from the past—spirits who want the place all to themselves. Strange accidents are slowing down the renovation, and Nancy is trying to figure out who, or what, is trying to scare everyone away. Nancy suspects that there is another force at work: greed.

== Reception ==
=== Sales ===
According to PC Data, Message in a Haunted Mansion sold 97,257 units in North America during 2001, and another 20,717 units in the first three months of 2002. Its sales in the region for the year 2003 totaled 44,826 units. The series as a whole sold 1.5 million units by 2004. By August 2006, Message in a Haunted Mansion's PC version had sold 300,000 copies and earned $5.5 million in the United States alone. This led Edge to rank it as the country's 64th-best-selling computer game of the 21st Century in August 2006. During the same timeframe, Nancy Drew computer games as a whole totaled sales of 2.1 million units in the United States. Remarking upon this success, Edge declared Nancy Drew a "powerful franchise".

=== Reviews ===
Reception

Aggregate score
Aggregator	Score	
Aggregator	GBA	PC
GameRankings	64%	78%

Review scores
Publication	Score	
Publication	GBA	PC
Adventure Gamers	1.5/5	N/A
AllGame	N/A	2.5/5
GameZone	8/10	N/A
Nintendo Power	3.6/5	N/A
The Electric Playground	N/A	7.5/10

The PC version received "favorable" reviews, while the Game Boy Advance version received "mixed" reviews, according to the review aggregation website GameRankings. In The New York Times, writer Charles Herold praised the PC version and noted that "the puzzle design is as good or better than most adult-oriented adventure games."

Message in a Haunted Mansion received a "Gold" Parents' Choice Award in fall 2000. It was also a finalist for The Electric Playground's 2001 "Best Adventure Game for PC" award, but lost this prize to Myst III: Exile.

Preceded by Nancy Drew: Stay Tuned for Danger	Nancy Drew Computer Games	Succeeded by Nancy Drew: Treasure in the Royal Tower
