= Nancy Drew: Danger on Deception Island =

2003 video game

- Developer: Her Interactive
- Publisher: DreamCatcher
- Series: Nancy Drew
- Platform: Windows
- Release: NA: October 3, 2003
- Genre: Adventure
- Mode: Single player

Danger on Deception Island is the ninth installment in the Nancy Drew point-and-click adventure game series by Her Interactive. The game is available for play on Microsoft Windows platforms. It has an ESRB rating of E for moments of mild violence and peril. Players take on the first-person view of fictional amateur sleuth Nancy Drew and must solve the mystery through interrogation of suspects, solving puzzles, and discovering clues. There are two levels of gameplay, Junior and Senior detective modes, each offering a different difficulty level of puzzles and hints, however neither of these changes affect the actual plot of the game. The game is loosely based on the book Whispers in the Fog (1999).

== Plot ==
Marine biologist Katie Firestone, a friend of George Fayne, invites Nancy Drew to Deception Island off the northwest coast of Washington state for a whale-watching excursion. Nancy arrives to find Katie's tour boat heavily vandalized, with a threatening note left behind that warns Katie to "stop meddling." Nancy learns that an orphaned female orca recently appeared in the channel off of Snake Horse Harbor. Katie reported it to the National Marine Fisheries service, who issued an order that all boats must stay at least 300 feet away from the whale or risk being fined.

The residents of the harbor are divided on what to do with the orca: Katie thinks it should be shipped to a scientific facility for research; local fisherman and mayoral candidate Holt Scotto wants the stay-away order to be lifted as it is affecting his and other fishermen's livelihoods; cafe owner Jenna Devlin believes the orca should be rejoined with its pod as soon as possible; and whale-watching business owner Andy Jason thinks everyone should leave the orca alone. Holt and Jenna are angry at Katie for her opinions and actions regarding the whale, and Andy is upset that Katie refused his recent offer to buy out her competing whale-watching business.

Nancy finds a strange piece of wood on the beach, which she learns belonged to a sunken ship called the S.S. Whitechapel Dawn that was rumored to have been smuggling suspicious cargo. Meanwhile, someone breaks into Jenna's cafe and steals food, tools, and boat parts. Nancy discovers the orca in a sea cave and realizes that someone has trained her to use her head to volley back any item thrown her way. She also finds cargo containers made of the same type of wood she found on the beach, along with a pair of Katie's work gloves.

Nancy returns to the harbor to find that Katie's boat is gone. She asks Andy to take her on his boat in the direction she believes Katie went, and uses her kayak to sneak onto a ship, where she overhears two men discuss using the orca to smuggle something. She opens one of the cargo boxes on the ship and finds animal furs inside. On the lower deck of the ship Nancy finds Katie bound and gagged. Andy appears on the deck, and Nancy realizes he is the ringleader of a group of criminals using the orca to recover the animal furs from the S.S. Whitechapel Dawn. The orca had actually been trained by the Russian military, and Andy staged the situation to make her appear orphaned and abandoned in the harbor. Nancy uses the orca to hit Andy's head with an oxygen tank, and Holt shows up with the Coast Guard to arrest Andy. The orca is united with a local pod, and Nancy heads home from Deception Island.

== Development ==
=== Characters ===
- Nancy Drew - Nancy is an 18-year-old amateur detective from the fictional town of River Heights in the United States. She is the only playable character in the game, which means the player must solve the mystery from her perspective.
- Katie Firestone - A friend of George Fayne who invited Nancy to stay with her on Deception Island. Katie is a marine biologist who owns a whale watching tour and takes tourists up close to the orca with her permit. Her studies theorize that the female whale is sick, and she thinks it should go to an aquarium for further research. Did her unpopular opinions land her in hot water?
- Holt Scotto - Holt is an influential community member and veteran fisherman who does not take nonsense from anybody. He is running for public office as harbormaster. He would like nothing more than to get rid of the female orca that is eating the fish in his waters and causing the fishing ships to detour around the harbor. Could he be the one sabotaging the Snake Horse Harbor to intimidate the orca supporters?
- Andy Jason - Andy is the owner of Whale World, which rivals Katie's whale-watching tour. He is well-mannered, but an aggressive businessman. He has offered to hire Katie and buy her boat so he can own a larger tour chain on the coast, but she has refused several times.
- Jenna Deblin - Jenna is the owner of a local coffee shop. She is usually very friendly, but when it comes to Katie and her research she gets pretty nasty due to their conflicting viewpoints about the orphaned whale. Jenna believes that the orca should be rejoined with its pod immediately and by any means possible. Would that include damaging boats and leaving threats?

=== Cast ===
- Nancy Drew - Lani Minella
- Bess Marvin - Alisa Murray
- George Fayne - Jena Cane
- Frank Hardy - Wayne Rawley
- Joe Hardy - Rob Jones
- Katie Firestone - Shelley McIntyre
- Jenna Deblin - Amy Augustine
- Andy Jason / Casey Porterfield - Jonah von Spreekin
- Holt Scotto - Richard Stein
- Wood Expert - Julie Rawley
- Hilda Swenson - Shannon Kipp

== Reception ==
According to PC Data, Danger on Deception Island sold 40,601 retail copies in North America during 2003. According to review aggregation website Metacritic, the game received "generally favorable reviews" from critics.

Charles Herold of The New York Times found Danger on Deception Island to be inferior to The Haunted Carousel.

Preceded by Nancy Drew: The Haunted Carousel	Nancy Drew Computer Games	Succeeded by Nancy Drew: The Secret of Shadow Ranch
