= Dead on Target =

Dead on Target may refer to:

== Books ==
- Dead on Target (The Hardy Boys)
- Dead on Target, Thornton King series novel by Glyn Jones (South African writer)

== Film and TV ==
- Dead on Target (film) a television based on the character of Derek Flint.
- Dead on Target 1988 List of Hunter episodes
