= Nancy Drew: Treasure in the Royal Tower =

2001 video game

- Developer: Her Interactive
- Publisher: DreamCatcher
- Director: Max Holechek
- Producer: Janet Sairs
- Designer: Wayne Sikes
- Artists: Laura Henion; Max Holecheck
- Writer: Erin Brown
- Composer: Kevin Manthei
- Series: Nancy Drew
- Platform: Windows
- Release: NA: August 15, 2001
- Genres: Adventure; Puzzle
- Mode: Single-player

Nancy Drew: Treasure in the Royal Tower is the fourth installment in the Nancy Drew point-and-click adventure game series by Her Interactive. The game is available for play on Microsoft Windows platforms. Players take on the first-person view of fictional amateur sleuth Nancy Drew and must solve the mystery through interrogation of suspects, solving puzzles, and discovering clues. There are two levels of gameplay, Junior and Senior detective modes, each offering a different difficulty level of puzzles and hints, however neither of these changes affect the actual plot of the game. The game was loosely based on a book titled The Treasure in the Royal Tower (1995).

== Plot ==
Nancy Drew arrives at the Wickford Castle Ski Resort in Wisconsin intending to take a ski vacation, but is snowed in by a blizzard. The castle was originally owned by a millionaire who had Marie Antoinette’s tower from the Château Rochemont in France taken apart and rebuilt into Wickford Castle, but the entrance is hidden and sealed off.

The hotel's caretaker, Dexter Egan, tells Nancy that the hotel's library (also imported from France) has been vandalized, and that the room of a guest named Beatrice Hotchkiss has been robbed. Nancy decides to investigate the crimes. She meets Hotchkiss, a professor of French history specializing in Marie Antoinette; Jacques Bruneis, a former Olympian for France who moved to Wisconsin for his American girlfriend and now works at the resort as a ski instructor; and Lisa Ostrum, a photojournalist documenting old Midwestern mansions.

Nancy does chores for Dexter while exploring the hotel and getting to know the other occupants. She finds ID cards from several different states that appear to belong to Lisa, but all have different names on them. She confronts Lisa, who explains that she sometimes needs "alternate identities" as a journalist. Nancy sneaks into the library, which is off-limits as a crime scene. In looking through its contents she finds out that Dexter is the adopted son of the castle's original owner, a prominent local tycoon, and that he got into trouble in his youth: he was expelled from school as a boy, stole money from his father's wallet, and spent twenty-five years in prison after being arrested for check forgery as a young man. Dexter was subsequently disinherited from Wickford Castle and his father's estate.

Nancy catches Jacques attempting to saw through a closed gate in a hotel corridor in an effort to reach the locked Marie Antoinette tower. He tells Nancy he is trying to find an old French document that would bring glory to his country, to make up for his poor showing at the Olympics; his great-grandfather had helped ship the tower from France. Nancy agrees to help Jacques find the document, but while searching for clues in Jacques' locker, she is knocked unconscious by an unknown assailant.

After waking up in her room, Nancy continues the investigation. She talks to Hotchkiss, who says that one of her goals as a historian is to prove that Marie Antoinette is misunderstood by the general public and was actually a kind, benevolent person. Later, Dexter tells Nancy where the key to the tower is located, saying she has earned the right to explore it. In the tower, Nancy finds puzzles guarding an apparent treasure. The clues to solving these puzzles lead her outside, where someone locks her out of the castle in an attempt to let her die of hypothermia. She starts up the ski lift to get the attention of Dexter, who helps her back inside.

Back in the tower, Nancy finds an old journal belonging to Marie Antoinette. She has Hotchkiss translate it, and discovers that Marie Antoinette hid a large diamond in the tower. Nancy returns to the tower and finds the diamond; she is confronted by Lisa, who has followed her and intends to steal the diamond for herself. Lisa admits to vandalizing the library and robbing Hotchkiss's room, in addition to knocking Nancy unconscious and locking her outside the castle. Nancy apprehends Lisa, and Lisa gets arrested for grand theft. The diamond and the journal are sent to a museum in Paris, and Hotchkiss is granted the rights to publish the journal's English translation in the US. Jacques' family name is cleared, Dexter is asked to be a co-owner of the castle, and Nancy enjoys the rest of her ski vacation.

== Development ==
=== Characters ===
- Nancy Drew - Nancy is an 18-year-old amateur detective from the fictional town of River Heights in the United States. She is the only playable character in the game, which means the player must solve the mystery from her perspective.
- Dexter Egan - Dexter was an orphan who was adopted by the castle's original owner, millionaire Ezra Wickford. Dexter grew up in the castle and now resides there as the caretaker. Are there secrets about the castle that he's trying to hide?
- Jacques Brunais - Jacques is a former French Olympic skier who has now retired as a ski instructor at Wickford Castle. He has a fiancé named Isabelle whom he is very eager to marry. His great grandfather helped prepare the castle's tower for shipment to Wisconsin, so perhaps his ties to the castle run deeper than meets the eye.
- Lisa Ostrum - Lisa is a photojournalist who is at the castle to write an article about old Midwestern mansions. She loves to gossip about the other people in the castle, and she seems very interested in the castle's tower. Could she have an ulterior motive for picking this castle for her story?
- Professor Beatrice Hotchkiss - Professor Hotchkiss is an eccentric woman who was robbed but refuses to leave her room to talk to anyone about what happened. Chatty and knowledgeable, she is a scholar of French History specializing in Marie Antoinette. Is she trying to keep the treasure hidden by the doomed queen for herself?

=== Cast ===
- Nancy Drew - Lani Minella
- Dexter Egan - Thomas Stewart
- Jacques Brunais - Justin Barrett
- Lisa Ostrum - Tara V. Smith
- Professor Beatrice Hotchkiss - Keri Healey
- Ned Nickerson - Scott Carty
- Bess Marvin - Claire Gallagher
- George Fayne - Maureen Nelson

== Reception ==
Reception

Review scores
Publication	Score
The Electric Playground	6/10
Discovery School	9.5/10

According to PC Data, Treasure in the Royal Tower sold 42,363 units in North America during 2001, and another 18,301 units in the first three months of 2002. Its sales in the region for the year 2003 totaled 36,847 units. In the United States alone, the game's computer version sold between 100,000 and 300,000 units by August 2006. Combined sales of the Nancy Drew adventure game series reached 500,000 copies in North America by early 2003, and the computer entries reached 2.1 million sales in the United States alone by August 2006. Remarking upon this success, Edge called Nancy Drew a "powerful franchise".

Treasure in the Royal Tower received a "Gold" Parents' Choice Award in fall 2001.

Preceded by Nancy Drew: Message in a Haunted Mansion	Nancy Drew Computer Games	Succeeded by Nancy Drew: The Final Scene
