= Nancy Drew: Secret of the Scarlet Hand =

2002 video game

- Developer: Her Interactive
- Publisher: DreamCatcher
- Series: Nancy Drew
- Platform: Windows
- Release: NA: September 17, 2002
- Genre: Adventure
- Mode: Single-player

Secret of the Scarlet Hand is the sixth installment in the Nancy Drew point-and-click adventure game series by Her Interactive. The game is available for play on Microsoft Windows platforms. It has an ESRB rating of E for moments of mild violence and peril. Players take on the first-person view of fictional amateur sleuth Nancy Drew and must solve the mystery through interrogation of suspects, solving puzzles, and discovering clues. There are two levels of gameplay, including a Junior and Senior detective mode. Each mode offers a different difficulty level of puzzles and hints, but neither of these changes affect the actual plot of the game. The game is loosely based on a book of the same name, published in 1995.

== Plot ==
Nancy Drew lands an internship at the Beech Hill Museum in Washington D.C., which is devoted to Mayan culture and will soon be exhibiting a newly discovered monolith to the public. However, shortly before the exhibition opens, one of the museum's most treasured pieces is stolen from the museum, and the thief leaves behind a mysterious red hand print. Nancy must find the stolen jade carving of Pacal and save Beech Hill from financial ruin.

== Development ==
=== Characters ===
- Nancy Drew - Nancy is an 18-year-old amateur detective from the fictional town of River Heights in the United States. She is the only playable character in the game, which means the player must solve the mystery from her perspective.
- Joanna Riggs - Joanna is the curator of Beech Hill Museum. Her eagerness to obtain rare Mayan artifacts have gotten her into financial trouble with the Beech Hill Board of Directors before. She knows a few Latin phrases and is usually all business. She doesn't get along well with the Mexican Consulate due to artifacts that the museum has acquired under shady circumstances.
- Henrik van der Hune - Henrik works at Beech Hill Museum. He was hired by Joanna from the Chaco Canyon Cultural Center, where he worked previously. An expert in glyph translations, Henrik works in the museum's lab studying priceless artifacts. Perhaps he learned something in his translations and then stole the Pacal stone to keep others from learning it secrets?
- Taylor Sinclair - Taylor is an art dealer with an office in Washington, D.C. He believes something shady is going on at Beech Hill and fears for the future of the museum. He is also concerned about the robberies of Prudence Rutherford and a museum in New Mexico. Is he just pretending to be concerned in order to get off Nancy's suspect list?
- Alejandro del Rio - Alejandro is an ambassador to the Mexican Consulate in Washington, D.C, and knows several languages, including Spanish, English, and Nahuatl. Alejandro passionately believes that all artifacts should be returned to the country they were found, especially when it comes to his home country, Mexico. He believes that Mexico has been 'robbed' of one of its greatest artifacts, the Pacal carving. Would he take extreme measures in order to repatriate artifacts to Mexico?

=== Cast ===
- Nancy Drew -Lani Minella
- Joanna Riggs - Laurie Jerger
- Taylor Sinclair - Jake Perrine
- Henrik van der Hune - David S. Hogan
- Alejandro del Rio - Gary Hoffman
- Bess Marvin - Alisa Murray
- George Fayne - Maureen Nelson
- Frank Hardy - Joshua Silwa
- Joe Hardy - Rob Jones
- Franklin Rose / Silvio Jr. - Wayne Rawley
- Gordon Bluefoot / Mack / Dr. Bob Bobson - Scott Plusquellec
- Prudence Rutherford - Simone Choule
- Henry Albert Daddle - Scott Carty
- Sheila Schultz - Amy Broomhall

== Critical reception ==
According to PC Data, Secret of the Scarlet Hand sold 50,195 retail copies in North America during 2003. In the United States, Secret of the Scarlet Hand's computer version sold between 100,000 and 300,000 units by August 2006. Combined sales of the Nancy Drew adventure game series reached 500,000 copies in North America by early 2003, and the computer entries reached 2.1 million sales in the United States alone by August 2006. Remarking upon this success, Edge called Nancy Drew a "powerful franchise".

John Moran of Lawrence Journal-World described the game, along with Nancy Drew: Ghost Dogs of Moon Lake as "well designed, engrossing and fun", adding "the animation is quite striking [and] facial expressions, facial gestures, even voices are lifelike". However, it received a negative review from Charles Herold of The New York Times. He wrote, "After three first-rate games, HerInteractive has stumbled, producing a game that is more concerned with trivia than puzzles."

Preceded by Nancy Drew: The Final Scene	Nancy Drew Computer Games	Succeeded by Nancy Drew: Ghost Dogs of Moon Lake
