= New Legends =

2002 video game

- North American cover art for New Legends. Despite being an Xbox exclusive, the North American edition doesn't feature the "Only on Xbox" branding.
- Developer: Infinite Machine
- Publisher: THQ
- Composers: Kevin Manthei; Kevin Riepl
- Engine: Unreal Engine
- Platform: Xbox
- Release: NA: February 19, 2002; EU: May 17, 2002
- Genres: Action-adventure, Hack and slash
- Mode: Single-player

New Legends is a 2002 action video game developed by Infinite Machine, a studio founded by former employees of LucasArts, and published by THQ, for the Xbox gaming console (not compatible with Xbox 360). It would be the only game released by the developer, as New Legends was a commercial failure, and Infinite Machine was unable to secure funds to continue development of their next game, Sam & Max Plunge Through Space, also intended to be an Xbox exclusive.

== Setting and Gameplay ==
The game takes place entirely in the country of China. The player controls Sun Soo, a young fighter who is fighting to free China and his kingdom, Soo Kingdom, from the villainous armies of Xao Gon. Throughout the game, players will use both melee weapons and firearms in a third–person perspective, while defeating enemies. Soo may hold up to two weapons at once, one in each hand, and can control both separately using the console's "X" and "B" buttons.

Certain locations in the game are based on actual locations in China.

== Reception ==
Reception

Aggregate scores
Aggregator	Score
GameRankings	54.89%
Metacritic	56/100

Review scores
Publication	Score
Electronic Gaming Monthly	4.2/10
G4	4/10
GamePro	7/10
GameSpot	7/10
GameSpy	7.3/10
IGN	5.5/10
Official Xbox Magazine (US)	4.9/10 (UK)

New Legends received mixed reviews upon release, and currently holds a 54.89% on GameRankings (based on 30 reviews) as well as a 56/100 on Metacritic (with reviews from 22 critics).

GameSpot's Giancarlo Varanini awarded the game a 7/10. Varanini criticized the "bland environments", camera issues, lack of replay value and short length, saying his play time clocked in at just over 5 hours. However, he praised the combat, saying "The game's combat system is executed so well that it saves the game from being just another cookie-cutter beat-'em-up".

GamePro gave similar points in their review, ultimately saying "New Legends could go down as one of the best bad games ever made".

Tal Blevins, reviewing for IGN, took issue with the game's camera, uninspired voice acting, poor graphics, a generic soundtrack, and repetitive game. Blevins did however praise the weapon variety and plot, ultimately giving New Legends a 5.5/10.

G4 TV gave the game a negative review, calling it "the most graphically inferior Xbox title yet", also criticizing bland level design and lack of puzzle, but did say the combat is entertaining and the controls are tight.
