= Tin soldier (disambiguation) =

A tin soldier is a miniature figure of a toy soldier.

Tin soldier may also refer to:

- The Tin Soldier, an English company that produces miniature figures
- Tin Soldier (film), a 2025 film by Brad Furman
- Tin Soldier (novella), a 1974 novella by Joan D. Vinge
- "Tin Soldier" (song), a 1967 song written by Steve Marriott and first recorded by Small Faces
- "The Steadfast Tin Soldier", a fairy tale by Hans Christian Andersen
- "Tin Soldiers", a 1980 song by Stiff Little Fingers from Nobody's Heroes

== See also ==
- Mini soldier (disambiguation)
- Toy soldier (disambiguation)
