= Huxley (video game) =

Huxley: The Dystopia
- Developer: Webzen Games Inc.
- Publishers: Webzen Games Inc. NHN
- Composer: Kevin Riepl
- Engine: Unreal Engine 3
- Platform: Microsoft Windows
- Release: KR: May 3, 2010
- Genre: MMOFPS
- Modes: Multiplayer, single-player

Huxley (Korean: 헉슬리) is a discontinued multiplayer first-person shooter computer game with persistent player characters published by Webzen Games Inc. It was being developed for Microsoft Windows. An Xbox 360 port was planned, but was placed on an indefinite hold and later cancelled.

== History ==
Huxley was initially going to be cross platform, but according to statements made at the 2009 E3 Expo press conference that feature was excluded from development. The contract to operate the game in China was sold to The9 for $35 million USD in February 2007, reportedly the largest export transaction at that time for a Korean-developed game.

In June 2008, NHN USA secured the rights to distribute Huxley via its ijji portal. In June 2009, NHN USA released the first English closed beta test via its free games portal ijji.com. The initial test had a small number of users and was carried out over a space of two weeks. Keys for the test were made available globally through ijji (globally) and in the US and Canada via FilePlanet. The second closed beta test was initiated in late-July 2009 and lasted until August 12. The second test allowed many more players to test the game. During the last two days of the test a high-volume stress test was carried out on to the servers where everyone with an ijji account was permitted to play the game during test hours.

In April 2010, Huxley was integrated with Hangame game portal and went into open beta on May 3.

In August 2010, NHN USA transferred the publishing duties of Huxley: The Dystopia to developer Webzen.

A Korean service for Huxley was discontinued in December 2010.

== Plot ==
In the near future, Nuclearites bombarded the world. Destructive earthquakes, massive tsunami and dramatic climate changes wreak havoc around the globe, isolating continents and driving the human race into chaos. Those who survive the destruction dream of tranquillity, but an eruption among the human race and the appearance of horrible mutants drives the world into further disorder. Racism and oppression cause rebellious uprisings and war that divide the landscape between two powers: Sapiens and Alternative. At the heart of the war emerges a powerful energy source called the Lunarites. The Lunarites were created by Huxley, a scientist and possible saviour.

Both factions seek glory and victory, fighting mercilessly for the Lunarites and their very existence.

The story was thought to be based on the novel Brave New World by Aldous Huxley, hence the name, but Webzen stated there are no tie-ins to the book's story and it was just an inspiration.

The game's visual style is reminiscent of the StarCraft series of games, which are extremely popular in South Korea (where the developer is based).

== Gameplay ==
The speed and style of Huxley was fast-paced and team oriented, combining gameplay from twitch shooters such as Unreal Tournament with the character advancement and large worlds seen in MMORPG's like World of Warcraft. Huxley's main producer Kijong Kang said that the cities in Huxley could accommodate up to 5,000 people (according to recent publications that number was increased to 10,000 since summer 2006), and the individual battles were supposed to support over a hundred players, but due to major changes in the game's engine and budget, the number of battling players was reduced to 64 players (32 against 32) at the most.

There were two main types of Player versus Player battles: Skirmishes and Battlefields. The Skirmishes were small battles between two teams of 8 players on small to medium-sized maps. One player was the host and could choose between a variety of settings and gametypes. The other players in the game were connected to the host and divided into teams based on their character's faction. Battlefields were much larger scale battles with higher stakes and more players. In the Open Frontier Test of Huxley, this mode supported 64 players, 32 of each faction. Battlefields generally took place on much larger maps, and had objectives that players needed to capture, retrieve, gather, or defend. Because hosting 64 players on a player's PC was difficult, the Battlefields were hosted by dedicated servers.

In the Player versus Environment portion of Huxley, players could either play alone or group up with three others to kill AI-controlled monsters and complete quests. All fighting took place in instance dungeons. There was also a town where players could meet to talk, trade, shop, and form parties.

== Soundtrack ==
Huxley Original Soundtrack

Soundtrack album by Kevin Riepl
- Released: April 13, 2008
- Recorded: March 2007
- Genre: Orchestral
- Length: 59:57
- Label: Webzen Games

The soundtrack for Huxley was composed by Kevin Riepl. The score was recorded by the 80-piece Hollywood Studio Symphony at Warner Bros in March 2007.

=== Track listing ===
No.	Title	Writer(s)	Length
1.	"Main Theme"	Kevin Riepl	4:03
2.	"Character Creation"	Kevin Riepl	2:31
3.	"Nostalonia Theme"	Kevin Riepl	5:24
4.	"Nostalonia Military"	Kevin Riepl	2:05
5.	"Eska Theme"	Kevin Riepl	6:05
6.	"Eska Military"	Kevin Riepl	2:05
7.	"Battle Zone Europe"	Kevin Riepl	3:15
8.	"Battle Zone Fjords"	Kevin Riepl	3:01
9.	"Battle Zone Archipelago"	Kevin Riepl	2:18
10.	"Sapiens Sewers"	Kevin Riepl	2:49
11.	"Low Health"	Kevin Riepl	1:15
12.	"Mission Complete"	Kevin Riepl	1:04
13.	"Mission Failed"	Kevin Riepl	1:04
14.	"Boss Appearance A"	Kevin Riepl	0:24
15.	"Boss Appearance B"	Kevin Riepl	0:30
16.	"Boss Fight"	Kevin Riepl	2:04
17.	"Sapiens Closed Area"	Kevin Riepl	3:12
18.	"Alternatives Sewers"	Kevin Riepl	3:39
19.	"Alternatives Closed Area"	Kevin Riepl	3:08
20.	"Radioactive"	Kevin Riepl	2:31
21.	"Eska Islamic Town"	Kevin Riepl	2:11
22.	"Boss Battle"	Kevin Riepl	2:14
23.	"Nostalonia China Town"	Kevin Riepl	2:10
24.	"Spot Public Ad"	Kevin Riepl	0:55
Total length:			59:57

== See also ==
- MMOFPS
