= Nancy Drew: The Haunted Carousel =

2003 video game

- Developer: Her Interactive
- Publisher: DreamCatcher
- Series: Nancy Drew
- Platform: Microsoft Windows
- Release: August 19, 2003
- Genre: Adventure
- Mode: Single-player

The Haunted Carousel is the eighth installment in the Nancy Drew point-and-click adventure game series by Her Interactive. The game is available for play on Microsoft Windows platforms. It has an ESRB rating of E for moments of mild violence and peril. Players take on the first-person view of fictional amateur sleuth Nancy Drew and must solve the mystery through interrogation of suspects, solving puzzles, and discovering clues.

The game was released in August 2003. Upon its release, the game elicited favorable reviews from gaming critics, who commended its graphics and plot. During 2003, the game sold more than 48,000 copies in the United States.

== Plot ==
Paula Santos, a friend of Nancy Drew's father and the owner of Captain's Cove Amusement Park in New Jersey, has asked Nancy for help because there have been mysterious things happening at the park. First, the lead horse disappeared off the carousel, then the carousel began mysteriously starting up in the middle of the night, and then the roller coaster suddenly lost power, resulting in a serious accident during which a guest suffered severe whiplash and is now suing the park. The park is shut down until the city knows what caused it. There is a rumor going around that the park is cursed.

After Nancy arrives at Captain's Cove, the park's head security guard, Harlan Bishop, shows her a video of the carousel randomly starting up. She also meets the park's bookkeeper, Joy Trent, whose recently deceased father was a co-owner of Captain's Cove until financial hardships forced him to sell his share just before his death. Finally she meets Ingrid Corey, the park's chief engineer, who firmly believes the park is cursed, and Elliott Chen, the park's art director, who is behind on his work due to chronic procrastination.

In Joy's office, Nancy finds a newspaper article about a man who found some missing jewelry from a jewel heist hidden inside a ride at the park twenty-three years earlier. According to the article, the police determined that the remaining jewelry is likely still hidden in the park. Nancy realizes that someone may have stolen the carousel horse in an attempt to find this missing jewelry. She later learns that the horse itself, one of a very few carved in the early 20th century by a sculptor named Rolfe Kessler, is potentially worth up to $100,000.

Nancy solves puzzles and does chores for the park staff in order to gain access to all the restricted areas of the park. While Nancy is investigating the roller coaster, an unknown assailant traps her on the tracks and starts the ride; after she escapes, she finds one of Joy's pencils next to the emergency shut-off button. She also finds a remote control device underneath the carousel that she realizes someone has been using to start it at night. Nancy learns that Harlan is an recently paroled ex-convict who was cellmates with the man who committed the jewel heist (who died in prison a year prior to the events of the game); Ingrid has been in contact with the man injured in the roller coaster accident regarding a "plan" and potential settlement; and Elliott is so far behind in his work that he's at risk of being fired.

Nancy gains entry to Rolfe Kessler's old workshop underneath the park's haunted house, and solves puzzles to access another secret room containing the remaining jewels from the jewel heist. She also finds the stolen carousel horse, along with several replica figures of that horse, and realizes someone has been making forgeries. She is confronted by Elliott, whom she realizes stole the horse, caused the subsequent "hauntings" at the park to artificially inflate its value, and is behind in his work for the park due to time spent making the replicas. Elliott traps Nancy in the haunted house and tries to kill her, but she is able to escape; Elliott is arrested, and the park reopens.

== Gameplay ==
There are two levels of gameplay: a "Junior" mode, and a "Senior" detective mode. Each mode offers a different difficulty level of puzzles and hints, but neither of these changes affect the actual plot of the game.

Wrong decisions can cause the game to end. In previous volumes of the series, these endings typically involved Drew's death; however, in The Haunted Carousel, a more frequent conclusion is Drew being fired for a mishap.

== Development ==
The game is loosely based on a book of the same name, The Haunted Carousel (1983).

=== Characters ===
Adapted from the game's official site.

- Nancy Drew - Nancy is an 18-year-old amateur detective from the fictional town of River Heights in the United States. She is the only playable character in the game, which means the player must solve the mystery from her perspective.
- Elliott Chen - Elliott is the park's art director and is responsible for all the visual components at Captain's Cove. He is a major procrastinator and is currently several weeks behind on his projects. The park's shutdown could seriously help him get caught up. He has no theory on what is happening at the park.
- Harlan Bishop - Harlan is the park's recently hired security guard, and he oversees the security system of Captain's Cove. He is helpful, efficient, and good at his job, but very evasive about his past. He's eager to prove to his bosses that they should keep him permanently. He thinks the mysterious occurrences are just a coincidence, and doesn't believe in the hauntings.
- Ingrid Corey - Ingrid is the chief engineer of the park and maintains all the rides at Captain's Cove, even the ones that have malfunctioned. She is extremely smart, but she is overworked while the park is understaffed during the shutdown. She is interested in holistic medicine and believes the park is actually cursed.
- Joy Trent - Joy is the park's bookkeeper, and she is in charge of all of the park's financial records. Joy's father used to be co-owner of Captain's Cove until Paula Santos bought him out when he went bankrupt. Joy is a nervous, sad, and slightly reclusive person who believes that the owner of the park is behind the haunting as a publicity stunt.

=== Cast ===
- Nancy Drew - Lani Minella
- Joy Trent - Laurie Jerger
- Elliott Chen - Gary Hoffman
- Harlan Bishop/Anton Sukov/Receptionist/Miles the Magnificent Memory Machine - Jonah von Spreekin
- Ingrid Corey - Kathleen Howe
- Paula Santos - Keri Healey
- Bess Marvin - Alisa Murray
- George Fayne - Maureen Nelson
- Frank Hardy - Joshua Silwa
- Joe Hardy - Rob Jones
- Detective K.J. Perris/Tink Obermier - Fred Draeger
- Lance Huffington/Luis Guerra - Max Holechek

== Reception ==
=== Critical ===
Upon its release, The Haunted Carousel received favorable reviews from critics. On Review aggregation website Metacritic, the game holds a score of 85 out of 100, denoting "generally favorable reviews". The Haunted Carousel remains the Her Interactive game with the most favorable critical reception, according to MetaCritic. In a review for Just Adventure, critic Ray Ivey awarded the album a letter grade of "A." He commended the graphics as "crisp, clean, colorful and appealing", deemed it the "tightest game so far in the series", and praised the game's shortness, observing that its brevity is in keeping with that of the book series. Writing for GameZone, critic Anise Hollingshead commended the album for providing a game for teenagers that's free of "graphic violence and sexual content", and opined that it was particularly fitting for players between the ages of 12 and 16. She awarded the gameplay a score of 9 out of 10, while graphics and sound each garnered 8 out of 10, and concept 7 out of 10.

Charles Herold of The New York Times wrote that The Haunted Carousel "returns to form with intelligent puzzles and an intriguing story."

=== Commercial ===
According to PC Data, The Haunted Carousel sold 48,500 retail copies in North America during 2003.

Preceded by Nancy Drew: Ghost Dogs of Moon Lake	Nancy Drew Computer Games	Succeeded by Nancy Drew: Danger on Deception Island
