= Cult of Crime =

Book by Franklin W. Dixon

- Author: Franklin W. Dixon
- Language: English
- Series: The Hardy Boys Casefiles
- Genre: Detective, Mystery novel
- Publisher: Archway Paperbacks
- Publication date: April 1987
- Publication place: United States
- Media type: Print (Hardback & Paperback)
- ISBN: 0-671-68726-3
- OCLC: 318995826
- Preceded by: Evil, Inc.
- Followed by: The Lazarus Plot

Cult of Crime is this third installment in the Hardy Boys Casefiles series, published in 1987. The story revolves around Frank and Joe who try to save a girl named Holly from the clutches of a person who calls himself 'the Rajah' (Rajah means King in Hindi).

== Plot summary ==
The Hardy boys hear their father and a person named Emmet Strand talking about his daughter Holly, who has joined the group of Rajah. Holly was a close friend of Frank, so Frank decides to join the group of teenagers who serve the Rajah in order to save Holly. The Rajah claims that he shall give everybody peace, so every teenager who is fed up with life, or is very frustrated joins the group in hope of finding peace. The Rajah is a very powerful man - even police officials are linked to him and do as he says. On a mission to rescue their good friend Holly from the cult of the lunatic Rajah, the boys unwittingly become the main event in one of the madman's deadly rituals--human sacrifice. The Hardy Boys try to escape the ritual, during which, Joe is framed that he kills a person very close to the Rajah, known as Vivasvat. Holly pleads with them to take her along; actually, she is linked with Rajah and wants to kill them.

The Hardy Boys escape with Holly. They are chased by a police officer who is linked with the Rajah. When they are travelling on a train, Frank is shot by a bullet and falls off of the train. Holly attempts to kill Joe but fails.

As the book progresses, the Rajah, taking revenge at the Hardy Boys, starts a riot in the city. He holds captive Emmet Strand. Rajah reveals that he is the son of Emmet Strand's first wife & that he is taking revenge for leaving his mother. Soon, the Hardy Boys catch him and he is handed to the police. Holly, along with her father Emmet, leaves the country.

== Reception ==
Cult of Crime was reviewed in the San Jose Mercury News, The Philadelphia Inquirer, and The Charlotte Observer.
