= Nosgoth =

- Developer: Psyonix
- Publisher: Square Enix
- Director: Corey Davis
- Producer: Sarah Hebbler
- Designer: Bill Beacham
- Composer: Kevin Riepl
- Series: Legacy of Kain
- Engine: Unreal Engine 3
- Platform: Microsoft Windows
- Release: Cancelled
- Genre: Action
- Mode: Multiplayer

Nosgoth was a free-to-play multiplayer action game, developed by Psyonix and published by Square Enix for Microsoft Windows through digital distribution. It was a spin-off from the Legacy of Kain series of action-adventure games, and took place in its eponymous fictional universe. Nosgoth employed a player versus player system in which each match consisted of two rounds. Teams were composed of characters assigned to one of two races: vampires, designed around hack and slash combat; and humans, whose gameplay was styled after third-person shooters. Between rounds, teams would switch to control the opposing race, and the team which accumulated the most points by fighting their counterparts won the match.

Initially announced in June 2013 following internet leaks, Nosgoth was the first Legacy of Kain-associated game to debut in almost ten years, preceded by 2003's Legacy of Kain: Defiance. Though once intended for release as part of a single-player project, Legacy of Kain: Dead Sun, it was reconceptualized and continued development as a standalone title following Dead Sun's cancellation. When officially revealed in September 2013, Nosgoth attracted negative reception for its conceptual departure from the traditional single-player and story-driven Legacy of Kain formula. Initially beginning its closed alpha and opening up its servers to registered players in late 2013, the game's open beta began in January 2015 and ended in May 2016.

On April 8, 2016, Square Enix Europe announced that Nosgoth's servers would shut down on May 31, 2016. Nosgoth's official forums also shut down on June 14, 2016.

== Gameplay ==
Nosgoth was an asymmetrical online multiplayer action game. Gameplay focuses on melee Vampire characters against the ranged Human characters, and consists of two modes: Deathmatch and Flashpoint. In Deathmatch, the Vampires and Humans fight against each other to get a higher kill-count than the opposing team. If the kill-count reaches a threshold, the team that reached it wins; if time runs out, the team with the higher kills wins. Flashpoint is an offshoot of traditional Domination modes that tasks Humans with capturing a series of control points on the map. Two points are initially available, chosen at random, and when one point is captured, another appears. Humans have a limited amount of time to complete their mission, but each successful capture adds time to the clock, extending the match. Vampires win if they can prevent captures long enough for the match timer to run out.

Both team types use a character class-based system, meaning there are different vampires and humans that have varying different roles. The gameplay is fast-paced and intense, as Vampires rely on surprise attacks. Both teams possess abilities, which can be activated having cooldown periods when used, or are passive/innately active. Vampires have the ability to fly and climb buildings, humans are grounded and do not get to experience this trait. The Humans rely on weaponry, and projectile-based ranged attacks, such as crossbows. They have ammunition that can be depleted, which can then be refilled at ammunition stations. Vampires being melee, will have very different ways to attack, such as pouncing on top of a human and clawing at them, making them unable to act as they are knocked down, or being grabbed by a flying-based Vampire and dropped into more Vampires.

== Plot ==
After the execution of Raziel in Legacy of Kain: Soul Reaver, Kain used the Chronoplast - a time-streaming device - to advance to his return, seemingly abandoning his empire. With the resulting power vacuum, the vampire clans of the empire fell against each other in a bloody civil war that nearly wiped out Raziel's clan. With the vampires occupied by their own internal struggles, humanity slowly became resurgent as escapees and free humans united to rebuild their shattered civilization.

Reconstructing cities and defences, and building themselves into a legitimate fighting force, the humans came to occupy a swath of southern Nosgoth. Attacks on key territories under vampire control eventually alerted the vampires to the danger posed by their former slaves and prompted the co-operation of the vampire clans in the face of the new threat - and a new war began for control of land of Nosgoth.

== Development ==
After the release of Legacy of Kain: Defiance in 2003, it emerged that a sixth Legacy of Kain game had entered development at Ritual Entertainment in 2004, but was canceled before being publicly revealed. In 2013, speculation concerning the existence of another new Legacy of Kain project began with the discovery that series publisher Square Enix had registered the domain name warfornosgoth.com, thereby making reference to Nosgoth, the fictional setting of the series. The Official Xbox Magazine subsequently revealed evidence that Passion Pictures artist Richard Buxton had worked on a Legacy of Kain "animation pitch" in 2011; Buxton responded with the comment, "I'm not allowed to talk about that". In May 2013, an Advanced Micro Devices patch log and a profile on the Steam database were found to contain further references to an upcoming title named "War for Nosgoth" or "Nosgoth". Additionally, the LinkedIn profile of video game composer Kevin Riepl referred to a project named "Nosgoth", citing Square Enix as its publisher and Psyonix Games as its developer.

In early June 2013, Square Enix London Studios community manager George Kelion responded to the leaks and ensuing fan speculation by confirming the existence and ongoing development of the Nosgoth project to VG247 and Eurogamer, saying "it feels weird to have a bunch of info out there and we don't want the community to get the wrong idea". He clarified that Nosgoth was set in the same universe as previous Legacy of Kain titles, but that it was "not a traditional or even single-player LoK experience". and that "it's very much on a separate branch to both the Soul Reaver and Blood Omen series". Kelion further stated that long-time Legacy of Kain developers Crystal Dynamics were not involved in the project, and that Nosgoth would be officially announced, and properly revealed, at a later date, beyond the Electronic Entertainment Expo 2013.

In late June 2013, Legacy of Kain fan Mama Robotnik posted evidence from sources at Climax Studios, that Nosgoth had originated as a primarily single-player, story-based game, named Legacy of Kain: Dead Sun. The project had allegedly been under development between 2009 and 2012 by Climax Studios with supervision from Crystal Dynamics, and was intended as a PlayStation 4 launch title. Its multiplayer mode, developed by Psyonix Games, reportedly became Nosgoth after the single-player component of the game was canceled by Square Enix in 2012, who projected that it would fail to meet sales expectations. Kelion responded by confirming that Dead Sun existed and that Nosgoth was intended to be its multiplayer companion game, but said Nosgoth is a separate project which has "grown in size and scope since its initial conception", featuring "different mechanics, characters, levels and gameplay". He rejected the idea that it is "the multiplayer component of Dead Sun pulled out and fleshed out".

According to Kelion, Nosgoth is not a reboot, a mobile game, an open world game, a massively multiplayer online role-playing game (MMORPG), or a real-time strategy game, nor is it "best described as a MOBA game" (multiplayer online battle arena). It derives influences from the second game in the series, Legacy of Kain: Soul Reaver, and is played from a third-person viewpoint. It was set to be available on Microsoft Windows as a download-only title. In March 2016, Square Enix and Psyonix announced that the game would leave early access very soon. However, on April 8, 2016, Square Enix announced that they had cancelled the game as it had failed to captivate a broad audience.

== Reception ==
Reception

Review scores
Publication	Score
GameSpot	6/10
MMOs.com	3.58/5
MMO & MMORPG Games	6/10

GameSpot's Cameron Woolsey rated the game 6/10, praising its entertaining gameplay and detailed environments, but citing a lack of content, balance concerns, technical problems and discontinuity with the Legacy of Kain series as faults.

The game holds a score of 3.58/5 on MMOs.com. Marc Marasigan highlighted the portrayal of vampires and entertaining action but also mentioned the limited number of game modes and the matchmaking system as weaknesses.

MMO & MMORPG Games gave it a 6/10. The review lists vampire gameplay, graphics and team deathmatch as positives, and the lack of development of the Legacy of Kain universe and unbalanced gameplay between humans and vampires as negatives.
