= Evil, Inc. (novel) =

Book by Franklin W. Dixon

- Author: Franklin W. Dixon
- Cover artist: Morgan Kane
- Language: English
- Series: The Hardy Boys Casefiles
- Genre: Young adult novel
- Publisher: Archway Paperbacks
- Publication date: April 1987
- Publication place: United States
- Media type: Print (Paperback)
- Pages: 153 pp
- ISBN: 0-671-62559-4
- OCLC: 15529351
- LC Class: CPB Box no. 1779 vol. 1
- Preceded by: Dead on Target
- Followed by: Cult of Crime

Evil, Inc. is the 2nd book in the Hardy Boys Casefiles series.

== Plot summary ==
The Hardy Boys come to New York for a vacation. When the brothers spot The Gray Man in Manhattan, they learn about an investigation he is working on regarding a terrorist organization in France. While the Gray Man does not want the brothers involved because they are too young and the case is too dangerous, the Hardys secretly work to get themselves in the center of the investigation and soon they find themselves undercover in France as a couple of gun dealers who are into the punk rock scene, complete with dyed hair and grungy clothes. They get caught up in a company called Renyard and Company, which secretly sells guns and other illegal things to people. They are almost killed in a machine when a lady known as Denise helps them escape. The book has an interesting storyline in which almost everybody is betraying each other - Renyard and Company, Denise and many other people. The Hardy Boys are also captured by the French special police known as the Sûreté. They eventually escape by beating everybody up.

Soon when the book is about to end, they are chased by the Chairman of Renyard & Company and his other partners. The people try to kill them but Denise saves them at the right moment. The case is then solved by the Hardy Boys and they return to the United States.

== Other editions ==
Evil, Inc. was also published in Czech, French, and Dutch.
