= Mini soldier =

Mini soldier may refer to:

- Miniature model (gaming), a small-scale model used in miniature wargaming
- Toy soldier, a miniature figurine that represents a soldier
  - Army men, plastic toy soldiers
  - Dimestore soldier, toy soldiers sold in five and dime stores
  - Tin soldier, miniature toy soldiers
- minisoldr, a pseudonym used by Mark Robinson (American politician)

== See also ==
- Small Soldiers, 1998 American action comedy film
- Toy soldier (disambiguation)
- Tin soldier (disambiguation)
