= Nancy Drew: Ghost Dogs of Moon Lake =

2002 video game

- Developer: Her Interactive
- Publisher: DreamCatcher
- Series: Nancy Drew
- Platform: Microsoft Windows
- Release: NA: November 19, 2002
- Genre: Adventure
- Mode: Single-player

Ghost Dogs of Moon Lake is the seventh installment in the Nancy Drew point-and-click adventure game series by Her Interactive. The game is available for play on Microsoft Windows platforms. It has an ESRB rating of E for moments of mild violence and peril. Players take on the first-person view of fictional amateur sleuth Nancy Drew and must solve the mystery through interrogation of suspects, solving puzzles, and discovering clues. There are two levels of gameplay, including a Junior and Senior detective mode. Each mode offers a different difficulty level of puzzles and hints, but neither of these changes affects the actual plot of the game. The game is loosely based on two books, Nancy Drew Ghost Stories: Ghost Dogs of Whispering Oaks (1983) and Mystery By Moonlight (2002).

== Plot ==
Sally McDonald, a friend of Nancy Drew's father, recently purchased a house on Moon Lake in Pennsylvania. The house is the former residence of a Prohibition-era gangster named Mickey Malone. Sally fled from the house in terror on the very night Nancy arrived for a visit. According to Sally, every night a pack of ghost dogs with glowing eyes and mournful howls attack her house. The dogs are believed to be the ghosts of Malone's four loyal Rottweilers. They allegedly vanished into the woods on the day of Malone's arrest and were never seen alive again. Nancy seeks out the truth of Mickey Malone's colorful history amid rumors of buried gold.

== Development ==
=== Characters ===
- Nancy Drew - Nancy is an 18-year-old amateur detective who was asked by a friend of her father's to help solve a case in Moon Lake, Pennsylvania. She is the only playable character.
- Red Knott - Red is an avid birdwatcher who sleeps during the day so he can make bird calls at night. He distrusts tourists of any kind, viewing them as threats to the natural ecosystem of Moon Lake. He dislikes Nancy due to her loud, inquisitive manner and the strange accidents that trail her.
- Emily Griffen - Emily is the friendly owner of Em's Emporium at Moon Lake. She is a talkative source of information, and sells just about everything under the sun in her store. Her antiques are rare, but she may be using suspicious methods to get hold of them.
- Jeff Akers - Ranger Akers is the only ranger in charge of Moon Lake State Park. He has a strict personality and takes pleasure in ticketing people and enforcing park rules, which has made him unpopular with the residents of Moon Lake. Sally's purchase of the old Malone place ruined his hope of the parks department purchasing the property and increasing the size of the state park.

=== Cast ===
- Nancy Drew - Lani Minella
- Emily Griffen - Katie Klein
- Jeff Akers - Scott Plusquellec
- Red Knott - David S. Hogan
- Sally McDonald - Keri Healey
- Vivian Burnett Whitmore - Margaret O'Malley
- Bess Marvin - Alisa Murray
- George Fayne - Maureen Nelson
- Frank Hardy - Joshua Silwa
- Joe Hardy - Rob Jones
- Eustacia Andropov - Alena Saunders

== Critical reception ==
According to PC Data, Ghost Dogs of Moon Lake sold 51,645 units in North America during 2003. In the United States, Ghost Dogs of Moon Lake's computer version sold between 100,000 and 300,000 units by August 2006. Combined sales of the Nancy Drew adventure game series reached 500,000 copies in North America by early 2003, and the computer entries reached 2.1 million sales in the United States alone by August 2006. Remarking upon this success, Edge called Nancy Drew a "powerful franchise".

Charles Herold of The New York Times wrote that Ghost Dogs of Moon Lake "is neither the best nor the worst [Nancy Drew game] but is set apart from the others by an inexplicable design flaw: it virtually solves many of the puzzles for you." John Moran of Lawrence Journal-World described the game, along with Nancy Drew: Secret of the Scarlet Hand as "well designed, engrossing and fun", adding "the animation is quite striking [and] facial expressions, facial gestures, even voices are lifelike".

| Preceded by Nancy Drew: Secret of the Scarlet Hand | Nancy Drew Computer Games | Succeeded by Nancy Drew: The Haunted Carousel |
