= Keri Healey =

American playwright and voice actress

Keri Healey is an American playwright and voice actress, who has appeared in seven Nancy Drew games developed by Her Interactive.

== Game appearances ==
| Year | Game | Character |
|---|---|---|
| 2001 | Nancy Drew: Treasure in the Royal Tower | Professor Beatrice Hotchkiss |
| 2001 | Nancy Drew: The Final Scene | Simone Mueller |
| 2001 | Nancy Drew: The Final Scene | Madeline |
| 2002 | Nancy Drew: Ghost Dogs of Moon Lake | Sally McDonald |
| 2003 | Nancy Drew: The Haunted Carousel | Paula Santos |
| 2007 | Nancy Drew: Legend of the Crystal Skull | Professor Beatrice Hotchkiss |
| 2012 | Nancy Drew: Tomb of the Lost Queen | Professor Beatrice Hotchkiss |
| 2013 | Nancy Drew: Ghost of Thornton Hall | Harper Thornton |
