= A Crime for Christmas =

1988 Nancy Drew and Hardy Boys novel

A Crime for Christmas is a Hardy Boys and Nancy Drew Supermystery novel published in 1988.

In New York at Christmastime, Nancy Drew teams up with the Hardys to help protect the crown jewels of Sarconne. They keep them from falling into the hands of two sinister crooks who are determined to get them. Meanwhile, Bess goes on a date with John, a complete stranger to her, and ends up with guns to her head. The final showdown takes place at a formal United Nations gathering.
