= Dead on Target (The Hardy Boys) =

1987 novel by Franklin W. Dixon

- Author: Franklin W. Dixon
- Cover artist: Morgan Kane
- Language: English
- Series: The Hardy Boys Casefiles
- Publisher: Pocket Books
- Publication date: April 1987
- Publication place: New York
- Media type: Print (Paperback)
- Pages: 153
- ISBN: 0-671-62558-6
- OCLC: 15529282
- LC Class: CPB Box no. 1726 vol. 32
- Followed by: Evil, Inc.

Dead on Target is a 1987 mystery-adventure novel and the first installment in The Hardy Boys Casefiles, a spinoff of the long-running Hardy Boys series. Published by Pocket Books, a division of Simon & Schuster, under the pseudonym Franklin W. Dixon and with cover art by Morgan Kane, the novel introduced a more contemporary and action-oriented approach to the adventures of Frank and Joe Hardy.

The novel begins when a car bomb intended for the Hardy Boys kills Joe's girlfriend, Iola Morton. Investigating the bombing, Frank and Joe uncover an international terrorist organization known as the Assassins and learn that its operative Al-Rousasa is planning to assassinate presidential candidate Philip Walker. With the help of a government agent and their friends, the brothers thwart a second bombing at a campaign rally. During a final confrontation, Joe fights Al-Rousasa, who falls to his death.

The novel marked a significant departure from earlier Hardy Boys books—and children's series books in general—in its treatment of violence, death, and relationships. As one author wrote in a study of twentieth-century series books, "In no other children's series—especially none of so long duration—does a consistently appearing character die." The opening paragraphs in which Iola is murdered, one reviewer wrote, "puts the reader on notice that the Casefiles series is serious business. No more kid stuff". Themes of terrorism and political assassination likewise reflected the publisher's effort to appeal to a contemporary teenage audience. The Hardys' relationships with women also became somewhat more explicit (although stopping short of sex), and Iola's death freed Joe to pursue more casual relationships—a stark departure from the original series, in which the boys' relationships with their girlfriends are essentially platonic.

Reviews of Dead on Target were divided over the changes to the series. Some welcomed the faster pace and more modern adventures, and found the earthier portrayal of the Hardy Boys to be more realistic. Others lamented the loss of the earlier series' innocence, and highlighted its violence. Combining these themes, one reviewer wrote that "perhaps parents should be glad that their children are reading anything. At least if they read the Hardy Boys they will be able to spell 'Uzi.'"

== Background ==
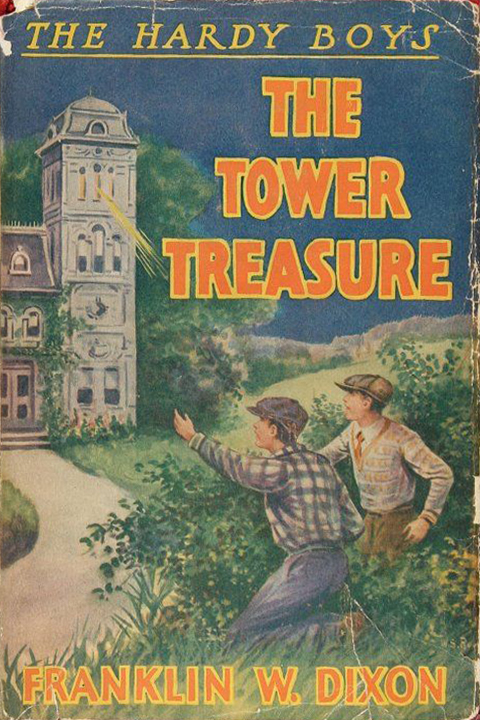
The Tower Treasure (1927), the first book of the original series

The Hardy Boys series began in 1927. It featured two brothers, Frank and Joe Hardy, as amateur sleuths who solved mysteries. The series was created by Edward Stratemeyer, the founder of book packaging firm Stratemeyer Syndicate. The books themselves were written by ghostwriters under the collective pseudonym Franklin W. Dixon.

In 1979, the Stratemeyer Syndicate switched publishers, from Grosset & Dunlap to Simon & Schuster; by this point the original series comprised 58 volumes. The latter publisher introduced several changes to the series, such as issuing subsequent volumes in paperback rather than hardcover and introducing more contemporary themes. It also created several spinoff series, including the Nancy Drew and Hardy Boys Super Mystery series (a crossover series in which Nancy Drew and the Hardy Boys work together), and The Clues Brothers (aimed at readers aged nine to twelve).

The Hardy Boys Casefiles was one such spinoff series, and was aimed at readers aged twelve to fifteen. The series was intended to appeal to a more contemporary audience. According to a publicist for Simon & Schuster, "Faced with the harsh realities of the modern world, Frank and Joe will confront terrorism, assassination, murderous cults and organized crime".

== Plot summary ==
When Joe's Girlfriend, Iola, is blown to bits by a bomb meant for Joe and Frank, the two brothers vow to punish her murderer. The killer is still on their trail, but before Joe and Frank can turn the tables on him, they're snatched up by the Network, a secret government agency that desperately wants the Hardys under wraps for their own good.

Then they learn that Iola's killer is "The Assassin," an infamous international terrorist. Joe and Frank are just his warm-up for a larger target—one whose destruction will rock the world. To stop him, they've got to slip out of the clutches of the Network...and challenge the Assassin face-to-face. (Note: In the book, "the Assassins" are a group, not a person; the main antagonist, however, is an individual nicknamed "the Bullet".)

— Franklin W. Dixon, Dead on Target, back cover

Dead on Target opens as a car bomb rips apart the boys' sedan with Joe's girlfriend, Iola Morton, inside. The book then flashes back to an hour earlier, when Frank, Joe, Iola, and Frank's girlfriend Callie Shaw had arrived at the mall to support a campaign rally for Philip Walker, who is running for president on an anti-terrorism platform. Iola saw Joe flirting with another girl and stormed off to collect more campaign leaflets from the car, at which point the bomb exploded.

Frank and Joe decide to investigate the bombing. They start by speaking with the Bayport police, but are rebuffed by Detective Inspector Samuel Butler—newly hired from the New York Police Department—who accuses the brothers of having caused the explosion themselves. The boys return to the mall to look for clues; while there, a man chases them and shoots at them with darts, one of which kills a security guard. The boys attempt to ambush the attacker after he follows them into a movie theater. He is joined by a companion, however, and the boys escape outside through the emergency exit.

Outside, the boys are picked up by Arthur E. Gray (known as the "Gray Man"), a mysterious government agent who works for "The Network" and has been keeping tabs on them. He reveals that the boys' father, Fenton Hardy, is head of security for Walker's campaign, and has been investigating a London-headquartered group called "the Assassins": "They started as a group of fanatics in the days of the Crusades. And they've stayed in the business of terrorism ever since—almost a thousand years of experience." The car bomb that killed Iola, he says, was likely intended for the boys as a threat to their father. Two Assassins in a truck then shoot at the Gray Man's car and try to drive it off the road. Joe shoots out one of the truck's tires, and the group escapes.

The Gray Man drives the boys home, telling them that he is headed to London and agents will arrive shortly to take the boys into hiding. Instead, the Hardys book flights to London, and board the same flight as the Gray Man. After takeoff, two Assassins disguised as elderly passengers attempt to hijack the airplane. Frank and Joe fight and subdue them, although one commits suicide with a cyanide pill. Upon arrival in London the surviving hijacker is interrogated with a truth serum, and reveals that a major American operation is being led by one Al-Rousasa. He is a "very heavy hitter on the international terrorism scene", the Gray Man tells the Hardys. His name is Arabic for "the bullet"—"And they say that whenever the Bullet is aimed, the target is dead." A raid by British Intelligence on the Assassins' safe house fails when the terrorists escape through a tunnel in the basement; a bomb rigged to the trapdoor seriously injures the Gray Man when he opens it.

Returning to Bayport, the Hardys deduce that Al-Rousasa was responsible for the car bomb that killed Iola, and that it was a rehearsal for an upcoming rally at the mall featuring Walker himself. They warn Inspector Butler, who dismisses their concerns; as the boys drive away from the police station, a car attempts to run them over. The next day the Hardys set out to search the mall after hours, with the help of Callie, Iola's brother Chet Morton, and their friend Tony Prito. They discover that Al-Rousasa is also at the mall, give chase, and end up in a sub-basement room filled with plastic explosives and directly beneath the area where Walker will speak the next day. Inspector Butler then walks in with an Uzi, and reveals that he is Al-Rousasa. He killed the real Inspector Butler, he says, then had plastic surgery to feign his appearance. He ties the group to a pillar and sets a time bomb to explode when Walker is speaking.

Callie is eventually able to slip loose and free the others. The room is locked, and Frank triggers a tamper alarm while disarming the bomb; he sticks the detonators and a small amount of explosives on the door just before they explode, thereby freeing the group. By then Walker is preparing to address the crowd, and the group fans out to look for Al-Rousasa. Joe spots him on the third floor preparing to fire his Uzi at Walker, but on the other side of the atrium; Joe uses an electrical cable to swing like Tarzan across the divide, tackling Al-Rousasa upon landing. Joe's hand is cut in the ensuing fight and Al-Rousasa stumbles over the safety rail, but manages to catch hold of the floor. Joe contemplates stomping on his fingers to avenge Iola, but chooses mercy instead and offers his hand. Al-Rousasa grasps Joe's hand and tries to pull them both over the edge. Frank arrives to grab Joe just in time, while Al-Rousasa slips from Joe's hand and falls to his death.

The Hardys are celebrated for saving Walker, although they keep secret the role of The Network. The Gray Man thanks them, and suggests that he would be open to their continued help. The book closes with the boys agreeing between themselves that they want to keep doing so: "As long as there are Assassins," Joe says, "there'll always be more Al-Rousasas."

== Analysis ==
"Get out of my way, Frank!" Joe Hardy shoved past his brother, shouting to be heard over the roar of the flames. Straight ahead, a huge fireball rose like a mushroom cloud over the parking lot. Flames shot fifty feet into the air, dropping chunks of wreckage—wreckage that just a moment earlier had been their yellow sedan. "Iola's in there! We've got to get her out!"

Frank stared, his lean face frozen in shock, as his younger brother ran straight for the billowing flames. Then he raced after Joe, catching him in a flying tackle twenty feet away from the blaze. Even at that distance they could feel the heat.

— Franklin W. Dixon, Dead on Target, p. 1

Dead on Target introduces a series with themes that are both more adult and more contemporary than not only prior Hardy Boys books, but also prior series books in general. Writing of Iola's death in the opening paragraphs of Dead on Target, Paul Dean stated in his book Mirrors of American Culture: children's fiction series in the twentieth century that "In no other children's series—especially none of so long duration—does a consistently appearing character die." A columnist for The Florida Times-Union wrote that this death "puts the reader on notice that the Casefiles series is serious business. No more kid stuff". Quoting the explosive first paragraph, a reporter for The Saginaw News called the transition "the literary equivalent of a punk haircut".

As previewed by Iola's murder, the book features substantially more violence and deaths than the prior series—perhaps influenced by contemporary television shows. Beforehand, wrote Deane, "death occurred rarely in series, and when it did, never involved heroes, their families, or friends". In just the first third of Dead on Target, by contrast, Iola is murdered, a security guard is killed by a dart intended for Frank and Joe, and a terrorist commits suicide with a cyanide pill. At the end of the book, another terrorist falls three stories to his death after he slips from Joe's blood-slicked hand: "'W—We should have remembered,' [Joe] managed to say. 'Nobody takes an Assassin alive.'"

The increase in violence was at least partly due to the sale of the Stratemeyer Syndicate to Simon & Schuster. According to the editor of the series at Simon & Schuster, the books set certain rules for violence. Deaths would typically be reserved for only particularly bad characters and these would typically occur by accident, such as while scuffling with the protagonists. "Frank and Joe still don't carry guns, although if one is dropped they can pick it up. They never aim at a person, but they may shoot out car tires"; "the Hardy Boys will never use guns to kill anybody". But to a former partner with the Syndicate, "There’s a primary difference in philosophy between us and Simon & Schuster ... The things in the new books, we would not have done. We made no specific references to murder, and we avoided specific violence." Reflecting on the violence in the new books, she said, "Those particular elements make me sad".

In Dead on Target, Frank and Joe are also more sexually aware than in the prior series. The romances of the original series were essentially platonic: "Frank particularly admired" Callie, and Joe "made no secret of the fact that he thought [Iola] a pretty nice girl". Although the editor of the Casefiles series indicated that there would be little beyond kissing, and certainly no sex, the relationships became more suggestive. Callie remarks to Frank in Dead on Target that "as soon as you're in a dark place, you get romantic", and Frank separately comments that the only downside to a lovers' lane turnoff is "the cops who shine flashlights in the window" of the cars.

Iola's death also frees Joe to pursue more casual relationships. According to a profile by the publisher, Joe "didn't recognize the depth of his feelings for Iola until it was too late. Now he keeps his love life casual, not wanting anyone to get as close to him as Iola did." Although this ability "to play the field" could have been accomplished with a simple breakup, wrote a reporter for The Cincinnati Post, "the killing introduces a definite change in the series".

== Publication ==
Dead on Target was published in April 1987 as an Archway Paperback by Pocket Books, a division of Simon & Schuster. The second book in the series, Evil, Inc., was published concurrently; the books that followed were published monthly. The books were ghostwritten and published under the byline Franklin W. Dixon, with the authors remaining anonymous. The editor for the series said that she liked to have five writers at work on the series at a time, although a publicity assistant said that they were predominantly written by one author.

The book features cover art by Morgan Kane. The painting shows the book's opening scene, as the boys' sedan is blown up and they dive out of the way; Iola, who is in the car when it explodes, is not pictured. Beneath the title are the words "Revenge is always a personal matter". Writing for The Gazette in Cedar Rapids, a reporter termed it an "updated look" from the original series. Another review, appearing in the Chicago Tribune and other papers, pictured Hardy Boys covers from the 1920s (Hunting for Hidden Gold) and 1950s (The Wailing Siren Mystery) alongside that for Dead on Target, and concluded "How times have changed."

== Reception ==
Writing in Newsday following a read of the first six Casefiles novels, two reviewers found the books to be a timely improvement on the original Hardy Boys series. In the old series, they wrote, "the boys were too wholesome for today's youngsters. ... they never fought or even argued. They also always supported each other — which we think is impossible." By contrast, they wrote, the Casefiles "books are creative, they deal with places we would love to visit, and they know the meaning of adventure", even while retaining the same identity as "mystery and adventure stories". Another reviewer agreed, writing in The Greenville News that Frank and Joe now "grapple with international terrorists" and "frequent shopping malls and use computers", but that "One thing hasn't changed, however: Frank and Joe remain crackerjacks at solving a mystery". A reviewer for Richmond Times-Dispatch similarly observed friction between Frank and Joe, noting that Dead on Target features "the first-ever Hardy Boys brawl ... when Frank tries to restrain Joe when Iona [sic] dies in a bombing". A reviewer for the Detroit Free Press termed the book a transition from "Detective know-how and naivete" to "stark realism".

Another reviewer, for The Denver Post, found the works "fast-paced" with "a lot more violence". As an example, the reviewer pointed to the cover of Dead on Target, "which shows the Hardys' car being blown up (but without poor Iola) and the Hardys running away". Although the reviewer (who read and enjoyed the original series as a child) found the original books to be "incredibly bad" upon a reread, and the Casefiles to be "still bad", he wrote that "perhaps parents should be glad that their children are reading anything. At least if they read the Hardy Boys they will be able to spell 'Uzi.'" The book editor for The Arizona Republic, meanwhile, noted that such series books had been dismissed at the beginning of the century and quoted a 1934 article in Fortune: "Tripe they were in the beginning, tripe they are now, and tripe they will always be." But "Tripe or no tripe", he continued, "the Hardy Boys go about their business much as they always have. They still live at home with their loving, supportive parents who never pester them with about [sic] such nonsense as going to school. And they're still polite, intelligent, athletic and resourceful." A reviewer for the Star-Herald termed the first two novels in the series "wholesome yet exciting", and suggested that they might help give "young adults an interest in reading".

A review in the Mobile Register decried a decline in reading amongst children and commented that the Casefiles publishers have "taken pains to make the Hardy Boys ... as relevant as a bulletproof limo. ... If Johnny isn't reading, it's not because the publishers aren't trying to interest him." At the same time, he wrote, the modern-day concerns reflected in books such as Dead on Target were "not pretty". "I naively wonder: Would Johnny rather have something pleasant, boring and predictable — like childhood itself?"

Several librarians, when asked about the series, suggested that it could offer "steppingstones" to better literature. Although one expressed concern about the violence (while continuing to stock the books), another called the violence in Dead on Target "sanitized" and "not at all bad". A third suggested that the covers to the first two books "hint that a lot more exists than really does", adding that "The Hardys never really do anything except knock somebody out. There were all kinds of threatened situations that never really arise: The boys were supposed to be tortured, but then something happens."

In two separate reviews that appeared together, including in The Bradenton Herald, the first reviewer lamented the modernization of the series. In the original series, he wrote, "there was a charm, a simplicity, an innocence, a sense of history". As for the Casefiles, "Somehow, I just can't get comfortable with the idea of Frank and Joe in designer jeans, cruising the mall for chicks." The accompanying review was titled "Frank and Joe are a hit with children" and quoted 12- and 13-year-old children who preferred the new series. According to one such seventh grader, "I liked Dead on Target. The older books had more mystery but not as much action."

Several months after publication, the editor for the series described sales as "very positive". The spokeswoman for Waldenbooks said that the series was "not like an outrageous success, but it's doing well".

== Bibliography ==
- Billman, Carol (1986). The Secret of the Stratemeyer Syndicate: Nancy Drew, The Hardy Boys, and the Million Dollar Fiction Factory. New York: The Ungar Publishing Company. ISBN 0-8044-2055-6. LCCN 86-5546.
- Deane, Paul (1991). Mirrors of American Culture: children's fiction series in the twentieth century. Metuchen, New Jersey: The Scarecrow Press, Inc. ISBN 0-8108-2460-4. LCCN 91-30998.
- Dixon, Franklin W. (1933). Footprints Under the Window. New York: Grosset & Dunlap. OCLC 3390638.
- Dixon, Franklin W. (1944). The Melted Coins. New York: Grosset & Dunlap. OCLC 4280509.
- Dixon, Franklin W. (1987). Dead on Target. New York: Pocket Books. ISBN 0-671-67258-4.
- "For It Was Indeed He". Fortune. New York: Time Inc. April 1934. pp. 86–89, 193–?. ISSN 0015-8259. Archived from the original on November 23, 2004 – via Series Book Central.
- Greenwald, Marilyn S. (2004). The Secret of the Hardy Boys: Leslie McFarlane and the Stratemeyer Syndicate. Athens, Ohio: Ohio University Press. ISBN 0-8214-1547-6.
- Handy, Bruce (April 1988). "Blown to Bits". Spy. New York: Spy Publishing Partners. pp. 121–122. ISSN 0890-1759.
