= Ascend: Hand of Kul =

2013 video game

- Developer: Signal Studios
- Publishers: Microsoft Studios; Signal Studios (Steam)
- Composer: Kevin Riepl
- Engine: SigEngine
- Platforms: Xbox 360, Microsoft Windows
- Release: Xbox Live Arcade; September 25, 2013; Microsoft Windows; May 20, 2014
- Genre: Role-playing
- Modes: Single-player, asynchronous multiplayer

Ascend: Hand of Kul (formerly Ascend: New Gods) was a free-to-play, character-action MMORPG game for the Xbox 360 and Microsoft Windows released in 2013. It was unveiled at the Electronic Entertainment Expo 2012 during Microsoft's press conference. Though the beta version was available in the Xbox Live Arcade for free to Gold members, the game never saw full release. On August 18, 2014, the game was delisted from the Xbox marketplace. On August 21, 2014, it was announced the game's server will be closing November 18, 2014. The PC version was shut down on June 20, 2016.

On December 1, 2022, a small team by the name of Outer Heaven Game Studios released Ascend: Reborn for PC on Steam, again as a free-to-play game.

== Plot ==
The main character in Ascend: Hand of Kul is a member of the Caos, a race of warriors. The player serves gods, pledging allegiance to one of the Three Gods (darkness, light, and void) and helping their chosen god rule over the world. The goal is to defeat the Titans. The Titans are large, immortal giants who were once gods who had physically manifested and became increasingly corrupted, as a result, eventually losing their sanity and becoming incapable of returning to the spirit world.

== Gameplay ==
The player controls a Caos, an entity shown to be massive in relation to humans. Despite their large size, Caos are very fast, and utilizing buffs in-game, one can capitalize on their speed or their raw power. The general gameplay flow follows a linear progression path, which unlocks key game mechanics and tutorializes the player while giving exposition on the game's world.

The game more closely resembles a hack-and-slash character-action game while playing it than an MMO, as the multiplayer mechanics are tuned for the Xbox 360 and its capabilities. Further development may have expanded the multiplayer features.

Primarily, you do combat with similarly-sized creatures and other Caos in order to serve the Light or the Dark - warring factions that offer the player unique buffs and aesthetics. A combination of standing, dashing, and running melee options are available for attacking and retreating strategies, in addition to spells and special abilities.

New equipment for the player character can be found throughout the game and offers the freedom to customize one's play style, within limitations. The balance of attack speed and attack damage is the primary mathematical "metagame" which one would focus on in order to optimize damage output, with passive or active buffs of the player playing a more supplementary role. As one progresses, the found equipment is typically stronger than in previous sections of the game, and is necessary to upgrading a character.

The game features parallel multiplayer, wherein the player proceeds on a single-player adventure, but can see other players going about their single-player adventures at the same time. The player cannot work together as in traditional co-op modes, but can purchase and send "blessings" and "curses" to one another. Curses summon monsters into the targeted player's realm, and players are rewarded if their target is defeated. Blessings send buffs to targeted players.

== Development ==
The title was developed by Signal Studios. The developer previously created Toy Soldiers, a game for Xbox Live Arcade. A re-release of the game was done by Outer Heavens Game Studios.
