= Double Crossing =

Book by Carolyn Keene

Double Crossing is a Hardy Boys and Nancy Drew Supermystery crossover novel. It was published in 1988 under the Carolyn Keene pseudonym.

== Plot summary ==
Nancy and George are on a cruise ship in the Caribbean, with George being the "social director" of the whole establishment. The two are having fun when suddenly, Nancy realizes of a plot involving the sale of CIA secrets, and a secret agent. Meanwhile, the Hardys are in the ship, going undercover as a photographer and a waiter, to pursue a group of burglars who target wealthy men and women.
