= River Heights (Nancy Drew) =

River Heights was an American paperback spinoff series (1989-1992) from The Nancy Drew Files series of mystery stories for preteen girl readers published by Simon & Schuster. Due to a scene in the prologue to the first book, Love Times Three, River Heights also connects the entire Files-Casefiles continuity (which includes The Nancy Drew Files, The Hardy Boys Casefiles, A Nancy Drew and Hardy Boys SuperMystery'88, The Tom Swift Series (Archway), and A Hardy Boys and Tom Swift Ultra Thriller) into the same continuity as the Nancy Drew Mystery Stories. The connection is that Nikki spots the clock in Nancy's bedroom and remembers that Nancy had been given that clock for solving her first mystery, The Secret Of The Old Clock. The pilot story for this series was The Nancy Drew Files #39, The Suspect Next Door. This series (also credited to Carolyn Keene) involved Nancy's neighbor, Nicki Masters, and revolved around Nicki's friends and rivals at River Heights High School.

Notable among the characters beside Nikki include her arch-rival, Brittany Tate, a popular newspaper reporter; her two friends, wealthy Kim Bishop and transplanted southerner, Samantha Daley (Samantha and Brittany later become rivals); Nikki's boyfriend, Tim Cooper, whom Brittany wants as well; Jeremy Pratt, a stuck-up rich boy who falls for Kim and softens her somewhat. Others include Ellen Ming, Madge Pouchard; Karen Jacobs and Nikki's best friend, Lacey Dupree among many others.

These books, unlike the originals, were mostly romance books. The series lasted for a short time, consisting of 16 volumes and a "Super Sizzler" special edition. Nancy Drew along with George Fayne and Bess Marvin make cameos throughout the series.

== Titles ==
The Suspect Next Door (Nancy Drew Files #39)

1. Love Times Three
2. Guilty Secrets
3. Going too Far
4. Stolen Kisses
5. Between the Lines
6. Lessons in Love
7. Cheating Hearts
8. The Trouble with Love
9. Lies and Whispers
10. Mixed Emotions
11. Broken Hearts
12. Hard to Handle
13. A Mind of Her Own
14. Love and Games
15. Friends and Rivals
16. The Jealousy Trap
- Super Sizzler #1: Junior Class Trip
