= Toy Soldiers: Cold War =

2011 video game

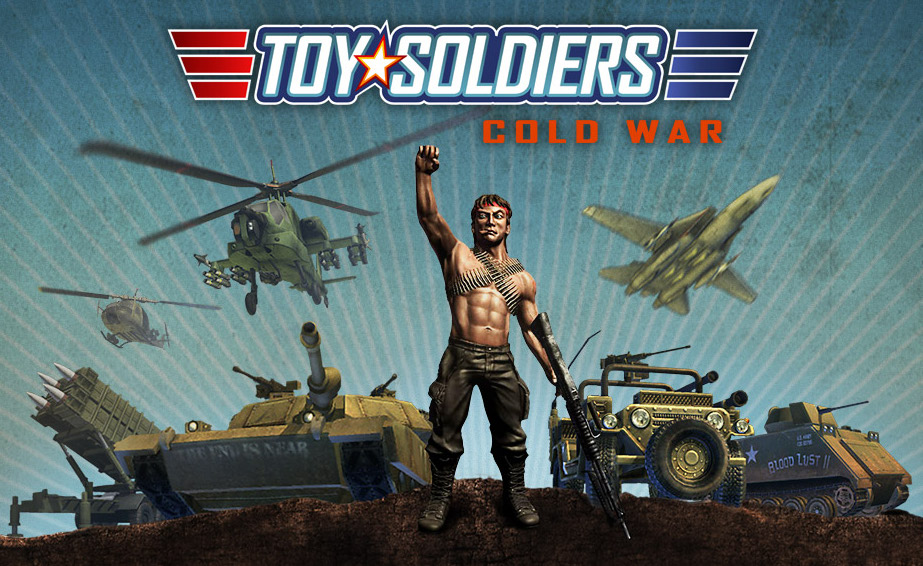
- Toy Soldiers: Cold War
- Developer: Signal Studios
- Publisher: Microsoft Studios
- Platforms: Xbox 360 (Xbox Live Arcade); Windows Phone; Microsoft Windows
- Release: Xbox 360; August 17, 2011; Evil Empire and Napalm; April 25, 2012; Windows; October 26, 2012
- Genres: Action, strategy
- Modes: Single-player, multiplayer

Toy Soldiers: Cold War is an action and strategy video game, developed by Signal Studios. It is the sequel to Toy Soldiers. Toy Soldiers: Cold War features 1980s-era military technology, and is based around the idea of military aggression escalating between the United States and the Soviet Union. Toy Soldiers: Cold War features a blend of third-person action and strategy, similar to the original Toy Soldiers, but with added features and gameplay mechanics.

== Gameplay ==
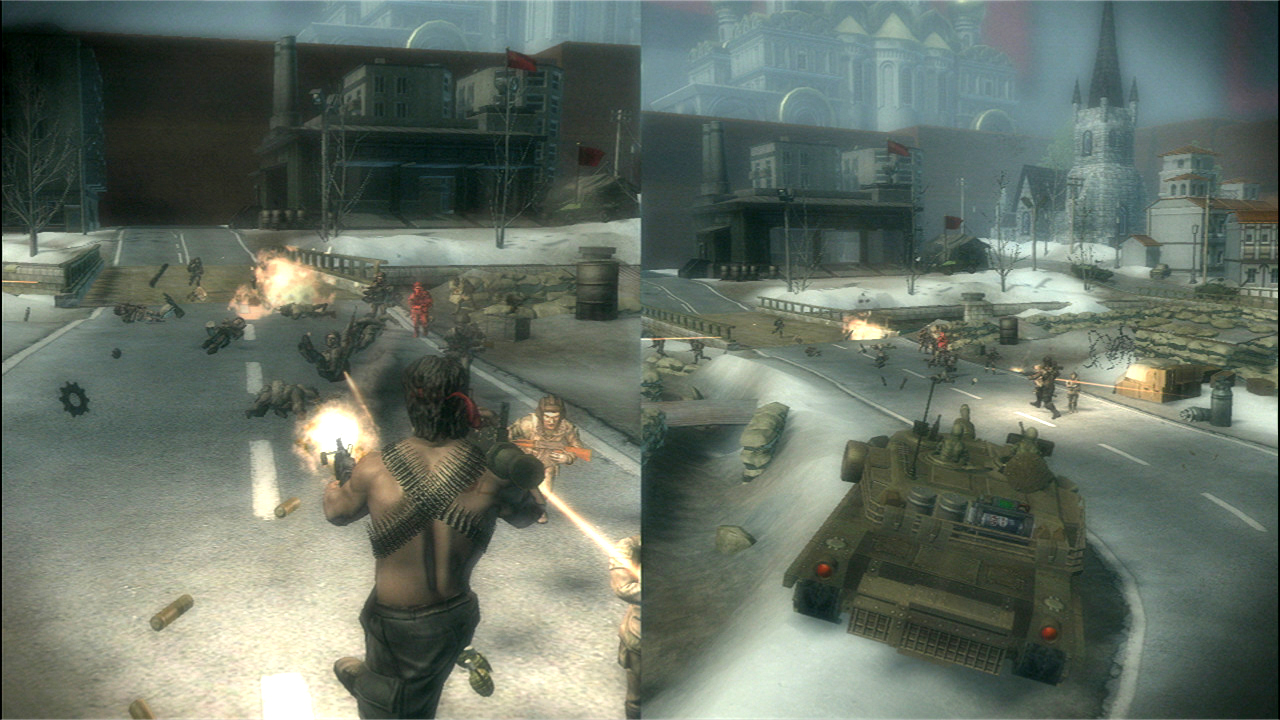
In Toy Soldiers: Cold War players control their army using real time strategy and can selectively play as individual units.

Toy Soldiers: Cold War features similar gameplay to the original game, with players trying to repel a Soviet invasion across a diorama towards a toybox in a child's bedroom. Compared to the original game which featured generic World War I battlefields, diorama settings range from jungles and deserts to real world locations such as the streets of Paris and the Great Pyramids. The game works in both single and multiplayer.

Players must place turrets in different locations and use them to kill enemy soldiers in order to stop them from reaching the toy box. If enough enemy soldiers make it to the toy box, the level is lost and has to be restarted. Turrets automatically engage enemies but, they can also be manually controlled by players. There are six different types of turrets that can be placed, and they are split into two separate categories. Small turrets including machine gun turrets, anti tank turrets, and mortar turrets, can be placed on any platform not already in use. Large turrets including artillery guns and anti air emplacements can only be placed on large platforms. Turrets of all types can be upgraded from Level I - Level II - Level III. For example the machine gun turret while playing as the USA starts an M2HB, and can be upgraded to a dual mounted M60, which can then be upgraded again to the M61 Vulcan.

The game also features boss levels with certain large enemies, such as the Antonov A-40 winged tank, the Typhoon-class submarine and the final boss, the Russian project R.I.S.E., and a number of changes and additions to the gameplay. For example, while players are still able to control vehicles such as tanks or helicopter gunships on the battlefield, time using these vehicles is limited by a battery charge which can be replenished either by collecting floating battery icons or returning the vehicle to its recharge stand. In addition, killstreaks are rewarded with special one-time attacks called "Barrages", which include being given the ability to call an airstrike or control an invincible Rambo-inspired commando for a limited time.

== Reception ==
Reception

Aggregate score
Aggregator	Score
Metacritic	81/100

Review scores
Publication	Score
1Up.com	B+
Destructoid	8.5/10 (Napalm) 7.5/10 (E.E.) 7/10
Eurogamer	7/10
Game Informer	8.25/10
GamePro	5/5
GameRevolution	A−
GameSpot	8.5/10
GameTrailers	8.2/10
GameZone	9/10
Giant Bomb	4/5
IGN	8.5/10
Joystiq	4/5
Official Xbox Magazine (US)	7.5/10
The Escapist	4/5
Time	8.5/10

=== Pre-release ===
The announcement of Toy Soldiers: Cold War was made on March 9, 2011, ahead of its first public showing at the 2011 PAX East convention in Boston, Massachusetts. Jordan Devore of Destructoid wrote, "Way to set the bar high, Signal Studios." Stephen Totilo of Kotaku wrote that "It looks like a fantastic upgrade."

Toy Soldiers: Cold War was also shown at the 2011 E3 convention, where it received a positive response. In addition to its inclusion in the Xbox Live 2011 Summer of Arcade promotion, playable demos of the game were available on the show floor. For the event, Signal Studios developed and released a new trailer, and the game was also featured in the Summer of Arcade promotional video. Referring to the barrage types, Arthur Gies of IGN wrote that "the show-stealer was The Commando. The Commando is, simply put, John Rambo, a John Rambo that carries a machine gun in one hand and a bazooka in the other, a John Rambo who screams things like 'You wanted a war!'"

Early reviews were generally positive ahead of release. Eurogamer wrote that, although the game was a clear improvement over its predecessor, "it can't survive more than a few days of intense play".

=== Post-release ===
Toy Soldiers: Cold War was released on Xbox Live on August 17, 2011, and received "favorable" reviews according to the review aggregation website Metacritic.

GamePro said, "If you buy just one tower defense game this year, well, knock yourself out. But if you want a really good action game with some tower defense, some great scoring challenges, some wonderful multiplayer support, some great graphics, and a wonderful sense of humor, you can't go wrong with Toy Soldiers: Cold War." Destructoid called it "a very well-rounded and big package of content that goes beyond what other games in this price-range tend to offer." GameRevolution said, "Even if you're not particularly a fan of tower defense games like me, simply controlling your units, getting combos, and using the special barrage weapons will win you over."

411Mania gave it a score of nine out of ten, saying, "Overall, Toy Soldiers Cold War is definitely worth your time. From hilarious one liners, to great music reminiscent of the 80's, Signal Studios hit one out of the park here. I can honestly say this game is the most fun I've had with an XBLA title in quite some time. Easily the best of what I have played from Microsoft's Summer of Arcade." The Escapist gave it four stars out of five, saying, "The game hits on a lot of levels; it's challenging, full of charm, and genuinely fun. I just wish it wasn't over quite so soon." The Digital Fix gave it eight out of ten, saying, "Toy Soldiers Cold War is a definite improvement on its predecessor and good value for your points on XBLA and whatever minor issues it has along the way are very easily overlooked. Boasting unique gameplay, an excellent premise and one cracking sense of humour it is definitely one of the highlights of this year's Summer of Arcade on XBL. Recommended."

"Toy Soldier[s]: Cold War immediately tapped into my inner child with its colorful and explosive action and is sure to dazzle real-time strategists, model makers and lovers of vintage weapons in the family." – The Washington Times

"Toy Soldiers: Cold War mixes just the right amount of humor, strategy and player control to prove fairly addictive." – Time

During the 15th Annual Interactive Achievement Awards, the Academy of Interactive Arts & Sciences nominated Toy Soldiers: Cold War for "Strategy/Simulation Game of the Year".

As of year-end 2011 sales of the Xbox 360 version exceeded 248,575 units.
