= Signal Studios =

American video game developer

- Industry: Video games
- Founded: 2008
- Headquarters: Kirkland, Washington, United States
- Website: signalstudios.net

Signal Studios is a developer of both video games and interactive software applications. Signal is known for their game Toy Soldiers, one of the top 10 best-selling Xbox Live Arcade games.

As part of the Toy Soldiers franchise, they have also released Toy Soldiers: Cold War and a number of DLCs for both titles. At E3 in 2012, the studio announced their first action RPG, Ascend: Hand of Kul.

The studio is located in Kirkland, Washington with over 40 employees.

== History ==
In January 2008, Signal Studios was founded in Bothell, Washington by three individuals. Their first office was a house along the banks of the Sammamish River. In 2010, Signal relocated to a larger office building on the North Creek of Bothell. In 2012, the company moved to Kirkland, Washington, to reside in the offices of the now defunct Sandblast Games.

== Games ==
Signal has released several games, as well as additional downloadable content (DLC), for both Xbox 360 (XBLA) and Windows.

=== 2010 ===
- Toy Soldiers (Xbox 360 + PC)
  - Kaiser's Battle DLC
  - Invasion DLC

=== 2011 ===
- Toy Soldiers: Cold War (Xbox 360) - featured in XBLA's Summer of Arcade 2011
  - Evil Empire DLC
  - Napalm DLC

=== 2013 ===
- Ascend: Hand of Kul
- Toy Soldiers: Complete

=== 2015 ===
- Toy Soldiers: War Chest (PlayStation 4, Xbox One, PC)

=== 2021 ===
- Toy Soldiers HD (Nintendo Switch, PlayStation 4, Xbox One, PC)

== Technology ==
Signal Studios uses an engine that was specifically designed for the development of multi-platform 3D games and simulations, called SigEngine. This suite of tools and features includes a clean object-oriented code base, a level design and entity creation tool (SigEd), modeling package plugins, shader and material editors (SigShade and MatEd), and an animation engine with a powerful script interface (SigAnim).
