= Toy Soldiers (video game) =

2010 video game

- Xbox Live Arcade Cover
- Developer: Signal Studios
- Publishers: Xbox Game Studios; Accelerate Games (Toy Soldiers HD)
- Composer: Stan LePard
- Platforms: Xbox 360 (XBLA); Microsoft Windows; Toy Soldiers HD; Microsoft Windows; Nintendo Switch; PlayStation 4; Xbox One
- Release: XBLA; WW: March 3, 2010 Windows; NA: April 27, 2012; Toy Soldiers HD; Windows, PS4, Xbox One; WW: October 21, 2021; Nintendo Switch; WW: December 31, 2022
- Genres: Action, strategy, First-person shooter
- Modes: Single-player, multiplayer (XBLA only)

Toy Soldiers is an action and strategy video game developed by Signal Studios released on Xbox Live Arcade on March 3, 2010. It is featured in the Windows 8 Consumer Preview Store. It has been available since February 29, 2012, debuting alongside the Windows 8 Consumer Preview beta release. The game was officially released for Microsoft Windows on April 27, 2012. A high-definition port, published by Accelerate Games, was released on October 21, 2021, for Xbox One, PlayStation 4, and Microsoft Windows.

== Gameplay ==
In Toy Soldiers, players control their army using real time strategy and can selectively play as individual units.

Players control one of two armies of miniature toy soldiers on a World War I model diorama with wooden and plastic landscapes. The diorama is set in various locations, such as a child's bedroom, library and lounge, and objects such as dressers and reading lamps are occasionally visible in the background. The game features 50 different controllable units including machine guns, mortars and tanks, with the fixed emplacements being upgradable to more powerful versions.

Players can create and control numerous units from a strategic command perspective or individual units on the field from a third-person action perspective. They can also command fixed emplacements that they create such as howitzers, mortars, and machine guns, or drive various vehicles such as tanks, biplanes, and bombers. When the player takes control of a single unit, the other emplacements are automatically controlled by artificial intelligence. When shot, the toy soldiers explode into plastic chunks but do not display blood, in order to keep the game family-friendly.

A tower defense-style single-player campaign is available, which involves defending a base from British or German soldiers. The player receives money for destroying enemies, which can be used to equip greater defenses. The single-player game features British and German campaigns among 24 unique levels. Once a campaign is finished, the player unlocks Survival Mode, which involves fighting continuous streams of enemies to last as long as possible. There are four difficulty settings. Multiplayer is also available (Xbox only), and can be played online over Xbox LIVE or locally with two-player split-screen. In multiplayer games, the player must focus on waging offensives as well as defending the base. Scores are tracked and compared in Xbox LIVE leaderboards.

== Development ==
Microsoft anticipated Toy Soldiers would be one of the biggest Xbox Live Arcade releases of the year. Microsoft officials compared the game to the Battlefield game franchise and real-time strategy games, but designed to be more easily accessible. A playable version of Toy Soldiers was spotlighted at the 2010 Consumer Electronics Show in Las Vegas. The music acquired for Toy Soldiers includes Goodbye, Dolly Gray and She May Have Seen Better Days, which play during the opening credits and main menu. Five other pieces were composed by Stan LePard for the game; two of these, The Sailor's Life for Me and There's a Candle Burning Bright, also play during the opening credits.

Toy Soldiers was released for the Xbox 360 via Xbox Live Arcade on March 3, 2010. On March 9, 2011, concurrent with their announce of Toy Soldiers: Cold War, Signal Studios announced their intent to release Toy Soldiers on the PC. The PC release was on April 27, 2012. On February 12, Microsoft released a companion Facebook game called Toy Soldiers: Match Defense, in which users and their friends match items to collectively win countries and conquer Europe.

=== Downloadable content ===
The Kaiser's Battle is the first downloadable content pack for Toy Soldiers. The pack adds several new features: French Army skins for all units, two new units exclusive to the French Army, a French mini-campaign featuring three single-player levels and the "German K-Wagen" boss, two new multiplayer maps, a new Survival Mode map and three achievements. The pack was released for purchase on June 30, 2010.

Invasion! is the second and final downloadable content pack for Toy Soldiers. The pack adds a new three-level mini-campaign including the "RoboBob" boss, two new multiplayer maps, a new Survival Mode map and three achievements. The player will take control of the German Army to fight off new British secret weapons, including Spacemen, Fire Trucks, Space Tanks, Chivalrous Knights, Flying Saucers, and P-51 Mustangs. The pack was released for purchase on September 29, 2010.

=== Sequels ===
Toy Soldiers: Cold War was announced by Signal Studios on March 9, 2011, as the follow-up sequel to Toy Soldiers. The game takes an interpretive look into what might have happened had military aggression escalated in the 1980s. Toy Soldiers: Cold War features a blend of third-person action and strategy similar to the original Toy Soldiers. It was released August 17, 2011, as part of Microsoft's 2011 Summer of Arcade promotion.

Toy Soldiers: War Chest was released on August 11, 2015, for Windows, PlayStation 4 and Xbox One.

=== HD remastered version ===
A HD remastered version of game, Toy Soldiers HD was announced and released on October 21, 2021, for PlayStation 4, Xbox One and Windows, and for the Nintendo Switch released on December 31, 2022. The game was published by Accelerate Games.

== Reception ==
Early reports of Toy Soldiers were generally positive. Game Informer writer Matt Miller said, "My early glimpse of the game has me pretty stoked." Matt Casamassina of IGN wrote, "Frankly, the title is a lot of fun, inventive and polished. [...] The style is great and the blend of fantasy with authenticity drives home the theme that despite all the carnage, these battles aren't real." GameZone writer Dakota Grabowski gave the game an 8/10, saying "Toy Soldiers is a brilliant way to kick start Microsoft's concentration on Xbox Live Arcade titles for the month of March. Signal Studios deserve a pat on the back for creating a unique tower defense title that sets itself apart from the rest of the pack." The game received a Metacritic score of 81 between 40 tracked critics. On February 11, 2011, Toy Soldiers received a nomination for Strategy/Simulation Game of the Year from the Academy of Interactive Arts & Sciences, competing against StarCraft II: Wings of Liberty (eventual winner), Warhammer 40,000: Dawn of War II – Chaos Rising, Civilization V and Supreme Commander 2. As of October 2010, Toy Soldiers has sold over 429,000 copies. As of year-end 2010, Toy Soldiers has moved more than 471,000 units, with its downloadable content selling in excess of 66,000 units collectively. Toy Soldiers was noted as the top selling Xbox LIVE Arcade game title of 2010. As of year-end 2011 sales exceeded 615,000 units on the Xbox 360, with the downloadable content collectively moving over 100,000 units.
