= The Nancy Drew Files =

Fiction series by Simon & Schuster

Secrets Can Kill, the first book in the Nancy Drew Files series

The Nancy Drew Files, or the Nancy Drew Case Files, is a detective fiction series started in 1986 and released by Simon & Schuster, New York. It is a spin-off of the original series of novels featuring Nancy Drew, with a greater emphasis on adventure, malice and romance. All the books have been written under the pseudonym Carolyn Keene. This series has been targeted at readers who are age eleven and up. With a new book released almost every month, 124 titles were released in 11 years. More than 17 million copies are in print and the books have appeared on the bestseller lists of Publishers Weekly, B. Dalton, and Waldenbooks. In 2014, Simon & Schuster started releasing this series in eBook format.

== Series background ==
The Nancy Drew Files is a spin-off from the Nancy Drew series. The stories follow teenage detective Nancy Drew. Her father, Carson Drew, is a successful attorney and a widower. Their house is taken care of by their full-time housekeeper, Hannah Gruen. Nancy's companions are usually her friends Bess Marvin and George Fayne, no matter whether she is sleuthing or shopping. Her boyfriend, Ned Nickerson also helps her with investigations. Contrary to their stable relationship in the original Nancy Drew series, Nancy and Ned's relationship is given more depth, and the two are portrayed as a somewhat dysfunctional couple. They break-up and reconcile multiple times throughout the series. But in the last book of this series, it is shown that they kept dating each other.

=== Notable books ===
- Secrets Can Kill (#1), Stay Tuned for Danger (#17), Death by Design (#30), and The Final Scene (#38) were all adapted into the popular Nancy Drew video game series by Her Interactive.
- Two Points to Murder (#8) features the first break-up between Nancy and Ned.
- Till Death Do Us Part (#24) sees Ned Nickerson proposing to Nancy, although she turns him down.
- The Suspect Next Door (#39) launched a spin-off of The Nancy Drew Files series, titled River Heights. However, that series was a romance series, with occasional cameos by Nancy.
- Out Of Bounds (#45) has Nancy recalling the events of Dangerous Games from the Nancy Drew And Hardy Boys SuperMystery'88 series and she specifically mentions that Hardy Boys playing a role in that case.
- ’’Greek Odyssey’’ (#74) from the ‘’’Passport To Romance’’’ trilogy has Mick Devlin from Australia asking Nancy to be his bride. Mick Devlin later appears in ‘’Danger Down Under’’ from the ‘’Nancy Drew And Hardy Boys SuperMystery’’’88 series where Nancy and his romance is talked about.
- Dangerous Relations (#82) is a re-telling of The Ringmaster's Secret from the original Nancy Drew series.
- All books from #112 (For Love or Money) to #119 (Against the Rules) feature stills from the 1995 television adaption as the covers.

=== Development ===
The Nancy Drew Files is the first spin-off from the Nancy Drew Mystery Stories. The series was developed by the Stratemeyer Syndicate, in its final year. The series was first introduced in two books from the Nancy Drew Mystery Stories, #77: The Bluebeard Room, and #78: The Phantom of Venice. These two books were much more modern and serious, while also featuring romance. These two books were the final books overseen by the Syndicate, prior to its sale to Simon & Schuster in 1986. The publishers soon launched The Nancy Drew Files concurrent to the original series, to aim for more mature readers.

The series is known as the most successful spin-off of the original book series, and also inspired a similar spin-off for The Hardy Boys. In 1995, the series reduced its release rate in half, by beginning to release a book every other month, instead of every month. Finally, the series was cancelled in 1997, in a mass cancellation of all mature-themed Nancy Drew and The Hardy Boys spin-offs.

=== Television adaptation ===
The 1995 television adaption, Nancy Drew, was based on The Nancy Drew Files. The adaption had very little to do with The Nancy Drew Files series, other than its modern and trendy setting, more mature themes, and Nancy and Ned's relationship issues. The series featured a college-aged Nancy, who moved to New York City, to attend college and live with Bess (who was an advice columnist) and George (a mail carrier and an amateur filmmaker). The series was produced by Canadian production company Nelvana, and filmed in Toronto (with an arc in Paris).

The series' stars — Tracy Ryan, Jhene Erwin, and Joy Tanner — were featured on the covers of the books, which were promotional stills of the television series. The promotion began on the 112th book, For Love or Money, and continued until book 119, Against The Rules. Ironically, For Love or Money was released the month the last episode of the series aired. By the time the books stopped the promotion, the television series had been cancelled for over a year (and in another twist of irony, The Nancy Drew Files would also be cancelled that same year).

== List of books in the series ==
The series featured 124 books (plus a promotional packet, distributed to promote the series ahead of its launch), all of which were edited by Anne Greenberg. Four additional titles of The Nancy Drew Files were planned, three of them rewritten as entries for the original series.

Titles, authorship, and publication dates
#	Title	Pub.	Manuscript
1	Secrets Can Kill	June 1986	
2	Deadly Intent	June 1986	
3	Murder on Ice	September 1986	
4	Smile and Say Murder	October 1986	
5	Hit and Run Holiday	November 1986	
6	White Water Terror	December 1986	Susan Wittig Albert
7	Deadly Doubles	January 1987	
8	Two Points to Murder	February 1987	
9	False Moves	March 1987	
10	Buried Secrets	April 1987	
11	Heart of Danger	May 1987	Susan Wittig Albert
12	Fatal Ransom	June 1987	
13	Wings of Fear	July 1987	
14	This Side of Evil	August 1987	Susan Wittig Albert & Bill Albert
15	Trial by Fire	September 1987	Chassie West
16	Never Say Die	October 1987	
17	Stay Tuned for Danger	November 1987	
18	Circle of Evil	December 1987	
19	Sisters in Crime	January 1988	
20	Very Deadly Yours	February 1988	
21	Recipe for Murder	March 1988	
22	Fatal Attraction	April 1988	Susan Wittig Albert & Bill Albert
23	Sinister Paradise	May 1988	
24	Till Death Do Us Part	June 1988	
25	Rich and Dangerous	July 1988	
26	Playing with Fire	August 1988	Susan Wittig Albert & Bill Albert
27	Most Likely to Die	September 1988	
28	The Black Widow	October 1988	
29	Pure Poison	November 1988	
30	Death by Design	December 1988	
31	Trouble in Tahiti	January 1989	
32	High Marks for Malice	February 1989	Chassie West
33	Danger in Disguise	March 1989	
34	Vanishing Act	April 1989	
35	Bad Medicine	May 1989	
36	Over the Edge	June 1989	
37	Last Dance	July 1989	
38	The Final Scene	August 1989	
39	The Suspect Next Door	September 1989	
40	Shadow of a Doubt	October 1989	Deborah Gaines
41	Something to Hide	November 1989	
42	The Wrong Chemistry	December 1989	
43	False Impressions	January 1990	
44	Scent of Danger	February 1990	Deborah Gaines
45	Out of Bounds	March 1990	
46	Win, Place, or Die	April 1990	
47	Flirting with Danger	May 1990	
48	A Date with Deception (Note: Part of the "A Summer of Love" Trilogy.)	June 1990	
49	Portrait in Crime	July 1990	
50	Deep Secrets	August 1990	
51	A Model Crime	September 1990	
52	Danger for Hire	October 1990	
53	Trail of Lies	November 1990	
54	Cold as Ice	December 1990	
55	Don't Look Twice	January 1991	
56	Make No Mistake	February 1991	
57	Into Thin Air	March 1991	
58	Hot Pursuit	April 1991	
59	High Risk	May 1991	
60	Poison Pen	June 1991	
61	Sweet Revenge	July 1991	
62	Easy Marks	August 1991	
63	Mixed Signals	September 1991	
64	The Wrong Track	October 1991	
65	Final Notes	November 1991	
66	Tall, Dark, and Deadly	December 1991	
67	Nobody's Business	January 1992	
68	Crosscurrents	February 1992	Rosalind Noonan
69	Running Scared	March 1992	
70	Cutting Edge	April 1992	
71	Hot Tracks	May 1992	
72	Swiss Secrets (Note: Part of the "Passport To Romance" Trilogy.)	June 1992	
73	Rendezvous in Rome	July 1992	
74	Greek Odyssey	August 1992	
75	A Talent for Murder	September 1992	
76	The Perfect Plot	October 1992	
77	Danger on Parade	November 1992	
78	Update on Crime	December 1992	
79	No Laughing Matter	January 1993	
80	Power of Suggestion	February 1993	
81	Making Waves	March 1993	
82	Dangerous Relations	April 1993	
83	Diamond Deceit	May 1993	
84	Choosing Sides	June 1993	
85	Sea of Suspicion	July 1993	
86	Let's Talk Terror	August 1993	
87	Moving Target	September 1993	
88	False Pretenses	October 1993	
89	Designs in Crime	November 1993	
90	Stage Fright	December 1993	Louise Ladd
91	If Looks Could Kill	January 1994	
92	My Deadly Valentine	February 1994	
93	Hotline to Danger	March 1994	
94	Illusions of Evil	April 1994	
95	An Instinct for Trouble	May 1994	
96	The Runaway Bride	June 1994	
97	Squeeze Play	July 1994	
98	Island of Secrets	August 1994	Louise Ladd
99	The Cheating Heart	September 1994	
100	Dance Till You Die	October 1994	
101	The Picture of Guilt	November 1994	
102	Counterfeit Christmas	December 1994	
103	Heart of Ice	January 1995	
104	Kiss and Tell	February 1995	
105	Stolen Affections	March 1995	
106	Flying Too High	April 1995	
107	Anything for Love	May 1995	
108	Captive Heart	June 1995	
109	Love Notes	July 1995	
110	Hidden Meanings	August 1995	
111	The Stolen Kiss	October 1995	
112	For Love or Money	December 1995	
113	Wicked Ways	February 1996	
114	Rehearsing for Romance	April 1996	
115	Running into Trouble	June 1996	
116	Under His Spell	August 1996	
117	Skipping a Beat	October 1996	
118	Betrayed by Love	December 1996	
119	Against the Rules	February 1997	
120	Dangerous Loves	April 1997	
121	Natural Enemies	June 1997	
122	Strange Memories	August 1997	
123	Wicked for the Weekend	October 1997	
124	Crime at the Chat Café	December 1997	

== See also ==
- Nancy Drew
- Nancy Drew on Campus
- List of Nancy Drew books
