= PC Data =

Company

- Company type: Private
- Industry: Market research
- Founded: 1991
- Founder: Ann Stephens
- Defunct: March 29, 2001
- Headquarters: Reston, Virginia, U.S.
- Products: Market intelligence; Business analytics

PC Data was an American market research and point of sale tracking firm founded in 1991 and based in Reston, Virginia. Its founder, Ann Stephens, had worked previously as the head researcher for the Software Publishers Association. Initially, the firm tracked only the United States' computer software market, but later expanded to include hardware sales and, in 1999, Internet traffic. By 1996, The Washington Post described PC Data as "the preeminent tabulator of facts and figures of the monthly sales of consumer software in the United States". Its coverage of the United States retail software sales market had grown to 80% by September 1998.

In March 2001, The NPD Group purchased PC Data's point-of-sale research branch and merged it with its Intelect Market Tracking division. Following a legal settlement with the rival company Jupiter Media Matrix regarding patent infringement, PC Data ceased Internet traffic research and closed later in March. Firms NetValue and ComScore purchased the remainder of PC Data's Internet research branch.
