= List of Nancy Drew books =

The character of Nancy Drew – ghostwritten and credited to the pseudonymous Carolyn Keene – has appeared in a number of series over the years.

621 Nancy Drew books have been published as of January 2026 over thirteen series, as follows:

== Series overview ==
- Nancy Drew Mystery Stories (1930–2003; 175 titles + 34 revisions; 8 revisions with different stories). The first 34 titles were 25 chapters long, before being shortened to 20 chapters in 1959)
  - Seven special titles released between 1973 and 1985.
  - Nancy Drew and The Hardy Boys: Be A Detective Mystery Stories (1984–1985; 6 titles)
- Nancy Drew: Girl Detective (2004–2012; 47 titles + 3 "SuperMysteries" + 1 "Ghost Stories")
  - Nancy Drew and the Hardy Boys Super Mystery (2007) (2007–2012; 6 titles)
  - Nancy Drew Diaries* (2013-present; 27 titles + 1 special)

=== For young adults ===
- The Nancy Drew Files (1986–1997; 124 titles)
  - Nancy Drew and The Hardy Boys Super Mystery (1989–1998; 36 titles)
  - River Heights (1989–1992; 16 titles + 1 "Super Sizzler")
- Nancy Drew on Campus (1995–1998; 25 titles)

=== For children ===
- Nancy Drew Notebooks (1994–2005; 69 titles)
- Nancy Drew and the Clue Crew (2006–2015; 40 titles)
- Nancy Drew Clue Book (2015-2024; 19 titles)

=== Graphic novels ===
- Nancy Drew: Girl Detective (2005–2010; 21 titles + 3 "New Case Files")
  - Rereleased under the Nancy Drew Diaries banner, with 10 collections of two titles a book
- Nancy Drew Omnibus Vol. 1 (March 2021)

=== Comic books ===
Published by Dynamite Entertainment.

- Nancy Drew and the Hardy Boys: The Big Lie (March–August 2017; 6 issues)
- Nancy Drew (June–October 2018; 5 issues)
- Nancy Drew: The Palace of Wisdom (Trade paperback: February 2019; Hardcover: January 2020)
- Nancy Drew & The Hardy Boys: The Mystery of the Missing Adults! (July 2019)
- Nancy Drew & The Hardy Boys: The Death of Nancy Drew (April–November 2020; 6 issues)
  - Rereleased as a trade paperback in March 2021

== Nancy Drew Mystery Stories (1930–2003) ==
Titles, authorship, and publication dates
No.	Title	Pub./Rev.	Publisher
1	The Secret of the Old Clock	1930/1959	Grosset & Dunlap
2	The Hidden Staircase	1930/1959	Grosset & Dunlap
3	The Bungalow Mystery	1930/1960	Grosset & Dunlap
4	The Mystery at Lilac Inn	1930/1961	Grosset & Dunlap
5	The Secret Of Shadow Ranch	1931/1965	Grosset & Dunlap
6	The Secret of Red Gate Farm	1931/1961	Grosset & Dunlap
7	The Clue in the Diary	1932/1962	Grosset & Dunlap
8	Nancy's Mysterious Letter	1932/1968	Grosset & Dunlap
9	The Sign of the Twisted Candles	1933/1968	Grosset & Dunlap
10	The Password to Larkspur Lane	1933/1966	Grosset & Dunlap
11	The Clue of the Broken Locket	1934/1965	Grosset & Dunlap
12	The Message in the Hollow Oak	1935/1972	Grosset & Dunlap
13	The Mystery of the Ivory Charm	1936/1974	Grosset & Dunlap
14	The Whispering Statue	1937/1970	Grosset & Dunlap
15	The Haunted Bridge	1937/1972	Grosset & Dunlap
16	The Clue of the Tapping Heels	1939/1969	Grosset & Dunlap
17	The Mystery of the Brass-Bound Trunk	1940/1976	Grosset & Dunlap
18	The Mystery at the Moss-Covered Mansion	1941/1971	Grosset & Dunlap
19	The Quest of the Missing Map	1942/1969	Grosset & Dunlap
20	The Clue in the Jewel Box	1943/1972	Grosset & Dunlap
21	The Secret in the Old Attic	1944/1970	Grosset & Dunlap
22	The Clue in the Crumbling Wall	1945/1973	Grosset & Dunlap
23	The Mystery of the Tolling Bell	1946/1973	Grosset & Dunlap
24	The Clue in the Old Album	1947/1977	Grosset & Dunlap
25	The Ghost of Blackwood Hall	1948/1967	Grosset & Dunlap
26	The Clue of the Leaning Chimney	1949/1967	Grosset & Dunlap
27	The Secret of the Wooden Lady	1950/1967	Grosset & Dunlap
28	The Clue of the Black Keys	1951/1968	Grosset & Dunlap
29	The Mystery at the Ski Jump	1952/1968	Grosset & Dunlap
30	The Clue of the Velvet Mask	1953/1969	Grosset & Dunlap
31	The Ringmaster's Secret	1953/1974	Grosset & Dunlap
32	The Scarlet Slipper Mystery	1954/1974	Grosset & Dunlap
33	The Witch Tree Symbol	1955/1975	Grosset & Dunlap
34	The Hidden Window Mystery	1956/1975	Grosset & Dunlap
35	The Haunted Showboat	1957	Grosset & Dunlap
36	The Secret of the Golden Pavilion	1959	Grosset & Dunlap
37	The Clue in the Old Stagecoach	1960	Grosset & Dunlap
38	The Mystery of the Fire Dragon	1961	Grosset & Dunlap
39	The Clue of the Dancing Puppet	1962	Grosset & Dunlap
40	The Moonstone Castle Mystery	1963	Grosset & Dunlap
41	The Clue of the Whistling Bagpipes	1964	Grosset & Dunlap
42	The Phantom of Pine Hill	1965	Grosset & Dunlap
43	The Mystery of the 99 Steps	1966	Grosset & Dunlap
44	The Clue in the Crossword Cipher	1967	Grosset & Dunlap
45	The Spider Sapphire Mystery	1968	Grosset & Dunlap
46	The Invisible Intruder	1969	Grosset & Dunlap
47	The Mysterious Mannequin	1970	Grosset & Dunlap
48	The Crooked Banister	1971	Grosset & Dunlap
49	The Secret of Mirror Bay	1972	Grosset & Dunlap
50	The Double Jinx Mystery	1973	Grosset & Dunlap
51	Mystery of the Glowing Eye	1974	Grosset & Dunlap
52	The Secret of the Forgotten City	1975	Grosset & Dunlap
53	The Sky Phantom	1976	Grosset & Dunlap
54	The Strange Message in the Parchment	1977	Grosset & Dunlap
55	Mystery of Crocodile Island	1978	Grosset & Dunlap
56	The Thirteenth Pearl	1979	Grosset & Dunlap
57	The Triple Hoax	1979	Wanderer
58	The Flying Saucer Mystery	1980	Wanderer
59	The Secret in the Old Lace	1980	Wanderer
60	The Greek Symbol Mystery	1980	Wanderer
61	The Swami's Ring	1981	Wanderer
62	The Kachina Doll Mystery	1981	Wanderer
63	The Twin Dilemma	1981	Wanderer
64	Captive Witness	1981	Wanderer
65	Mystery of the Winged Lion	1982	Wanderer
66	Race Against Time	1982	Wanderer
67	The Sinister Omen	1982	Wanderer
68	The Elusive Heiress	1982	Wanderer
69	Clue in the Ancient Disguise	1982	Wanderer
70	The Broken Anchor	1983	Wanderer
71	The Silver Cobweb	1983	Wanderer
72	The Haunted Carousel	1983	Wanderer
73	Enemy Match	1984	Wanderer
74	The Mysterious Image	1984	Wanderer
75	The Emerald-Eyed Cat Mystery	1984	Wanderer
76	The Eskimo's Secret	1985	Wanderer
77	The Bluebeard Room	1985	Wanderer
78	The Phantom of Venice	1985	Wanderer
79	The Double Horror of Fenley Place	1987	Minstrel
80	The Case of the Disappearing Diamonds	1987	Minstrel
81	The Mardi Gras Mystery	1988	Minstrel
82	The Clue in the Camera	1988	Minstrel
83	The Case of the Vanishing Veil	1988	Minstrel
84	The Joker's Revenge	1988	Minstrel
85	The Secret of Shady Glen	1988	Minstrel
86	The Mystery of Misty Canyon	1988	Minstrel
87	The Case of the Rising Stars	1989	Minstrel
88	The Search for Cindy Austin	1989	Minstrel
89	The Case of the Disappearing Deejay	1989	Minstrel
90	The Puzzle at Pineview School	1989	Minstrel
91	The Girl Who Couldn't Remember	1989	Minstrel
92	The Ghost of Craven Cove	1989	Minstrel
93	The Case of the Safecracker's Secret	1990	Minstrel
94	The Picture-Perfect Mystery	1990	Minstrel
95	The Silent Suspect	1990	Minstrel
96	The Case of the Photo Finish	1990	Minstrel
97	The Mystery of Magnolia Mansion	1990	Minstrel
98	The Haunting of Horse Island	1990	Minstrel
99	The Secret at Seven Rocks	1991	Minstrel
100	A Secret in Time	1991	Minstrel
101	The Mystery of the Missing Millionairess	1991	Minstrel
102	The Secret in the Dark	1991	Minstrel
103	The Stranger in the Shadows	1991	Minstrel
104	The Mystery of the Jade Tiger	1991	Minstrel
105	The Clue in the Antique Trunk	1992	Minstrel
106	The Case of the Artful Crime	1992	Minstrel
107	The Legend of Miner's Creek	1992	Minstrel
108	The Secret of the Tibetan Treasure	1992	Minstrel
109	The Mystery of the Masked Rider	1992	Minstrel
110	The Nutcracker Ballet Mystery	1992	Minstrel
111	The Secret at Solaire	1993	Minstrel
112	Crime in the Queen's Court	1993	Minstrel
113	The Secret Lost at Sea	1993	Minstrel
114	The Search for the Silver Persian	1993	Minstrel
115	The Suspect in the Smoke	1993	Minstrel
116	The Case of the Twin Teddy Bears	1993	Minstrel
117	Mystery on the Menu	1994	Minstrel
118	Trouble At Lake Tahoe	1994	Minstrel
119	The Mystery of the Missing Mascot	1994	Minstrel
120	The Case of the Floating Crime	1994	Minstrel
121	The Fortune Teller's Secret	1994	Minstrel
122	The Message in the Haunted Mansion	1994	Minstrel
123	The Clue on the Silver Screen	1995	Minstrel
124	The Secret of the Scarlet Hand	1995	Minstrel
125	The Teen Model Mystery	1995	Minstrel
126	The Riddle in the Rare Book	1995	Minstrel
127	The Case of the Dangerous Solution	1995	Minstrel
128	The Treasure in the Royal Tower	1995	Minstrel
129	The Baby-Sitter Burglaries	1996	Minstrel
130	The Sign of the Falcon	1996	Minstrel
131	The Hidden Inheritance	1996	Minstrel
132	The Fox Hunt Mystery	1996	Minstrel
133	The Mystery at the Crystal Palace	1996	Minstrel
134	The Secret of the Forgotten Cave	1996	Minstrel
135	The Riddle of the Ruby Gazelle	1997	Minstrel
136	The Wedding Day Mystery	1997	Minstrel
137	In Search of the Black Rose	1997	Minstrel
138	The Legend of the Lost Gold	1997	Minstrel
139	The Secret of Candlelight Inn	1997	Minstrel
140	The Door-to-Door Deception	1997	Minstrel
141	The Wild Cat Crime	1998	Minstrel
142	The Case of Capital Intrigue	1998	Minstrel
143	Mystery on Maui	1998	Minstrel
144	The E-mail Mystery	1998	Minstrel
145	The Missing Horse Mystery	1998	Minstrel
146	The Ghost of the Lantern Lady	1998	Minstrel
147	The Case of the Captured Queen	1999	Minstrel
148	On the Trail of Trouble	1999	Minstrel
149	The Clue of the Gold Doubloons	1999	Minstrel
150	Mystery at Moorsea Manor	1999	Minstrel
151	The Chocolate-Covered Contest	1999	Minstrel
152	The Key in the Satin Pocket	2000	Minstrel
153	Whispers In the Fog	2000	Minstrel
154	The Legend of the Emerald Lady	2000	Minstrel
155	The Mystery in Tornado Alley	2000	Minstrel
156	The Secret in the Stars	2000	Minstrel
157	The Music Festival Mystery	2000	Minstrel
158	The Curse of the Black Cat	2001	Minstrel
159	The Secret of the Fiery Chamber	2001	Minstrel
160	The Clue on the Crystal Dove	2001	Aladdin
161	Lost in the Everglades	2001	Aladdin
162	The Case of the Lost Song	2001	Aladdin
163	The Clues Challenge	2001	Aladdin
164	The Mystery of the Mother Wolf	2002	Aladdin
165	The Crime Lab Case	2002	Aladdin
166	The Case of the Creative Crime	2002	Aladdin
167	Mystery By Moonlight	2002	Aladdin
168	The Bike Tour Mystery	2002	Aladdin
169	The Mistletoe Mystery	2002	Aladdin
170	No Strings Attached	2003	Aladdin
171	Intrigue at the Grand Opera	2003	Aladdin
172	The Riding Club Crime	2003	Aladdin
173	Danger on the Great Lakes	2003	Aladdin
174	A Taste of Danger	2003	Aladdin
175	Werewolf in a Winter Wonderland	2003	Aladdin

=== Specials ===
- The Nancy Drew Cookbook: Clues to Good Cooking (1973)
- Nancy Drew Picture Book: Mystery of the Lost Dogs (1977)
- Nancy Drew Picture Book: The Secret of the Twin Puppets (1977)
- The Nancy Drew Sleuth Book: Clues to Good Sleuthing (1979)
- Nancy Drew and the Hardy Boys: Super Sleuths (1981)
- Nancy Drew Ghost Stories (1983)
- Nancy Drew and the Hardy Boys: Super Sleuths #2 (1984)
- Nancy Drew and the Hardy Boys: Campfire Stories (1984)
- Nancy Drew Ghost Stories #2 (1985)
- Case of the Curious Collection (2023)

The first four works were published by Grosset & Dunlap. The Nancy Drew Cookbook contained recipes and short stories. Both titles under the Nancy Drew Picture Book banner were illustrated picture books aimed at younger readers. The Nancy Drew Sleuth Book contained short stories that involved Nancy teaching a group of younger girls how she solves her mysteries, and gives lessons to the reader on the techniques used.

The first Nancy Drew and the Hardy Boys: Super Sleuths book was published in 1981, after switching over to Simon & Schuster. The book contained seven short stories in which Nancy Drew crosses over to solve mysteries with The Hardy Boys; both the Carolyn Keene pseudonym and The Hardy Boys' Franklin W. Dixon pseudonym are used. The story was so popular, that it spawned a sequel, a spin-off series, and a Campfire Stories companion.

In 1983, Nancy Drew Ghost Stories was published, also containing seven short stories. It, too, spawned a sequel in 1985. Unlike other specials, though, the first volume was reprinted by the later Minstrel and Aladdin imprints.

== Nancy Drew and the Hardy Boys: Be a Detective Mystery Stories (1984–1985) ==
These titles feature a level of reader-interaction in a manner similar to the Choose Your Own Adventure books. The series was published by Wanderer.

Two more volumes, Jungle of Evil and Ticket to Intrigue, were planned and advertised, but were unpublished after the sale of the Stratemeyer Syndicate to Simon & Schuster.

Titles and publication dates
No.	Title	Pub.
1	The Secret of the Knight’s Sword	1984
2	Danger on Ice	1984
3	The Feathered Serpent	1984
4	Secret Cargo	1984
5	The Alaskan Mystery	1985
6	The Missing Money Mystery	1985

== Nancy Drew Notebooks (1994–2005) ==
The Nancy Drew Notebooks were aimed at younger readers and featured a Nancy who was still in grade school. The series was published from 1994 to 2005.

== The Nancy Drew Files (1986–1997) ==
In 1986, Simon & Schuster, Inc. began publishing a spin-off series, The Nancy Drew Files, running concurrently with the main Nancy Drew Mystery Stories line. The Nancy Drew Files were aimed at an older, teenage audience, and is similar in style, target audience, and sensibilities with The Hardy Boys Casefiles.

Starting in January 2014, Simon & Schuster began releasing this series as eBooks.

Nancy Drew Files Volume I and Nancy Drew Files Volume II were published September 24, 2019 under the Simon Pulse imprint. These are reprints of the first six titles in the series, books 1, 2, and 3 in volume I and books 4, 5 and 6 in volume II. Cover art by Fernanda Suarez.

== Nancy Drew and Hardy Boys Super Mystery (1988–1998) ==
The Hardy Boys and Nancy Drew teamed up in this 36 volume series of paperbacks. This series follows the formula of the main characters and their friends typically involved in separate mysteries that end up being connected. The sleuths join forces to solve the overall mystery. This series is based in the Nancy Drew Files and Hardy Boys Casefiles continuity, so murder, romance, and flirtation between the series regulars are common. Nancy Drew and Frank Hardy share an attraction in this series, though after a brief kiss in "The Last Resort" this attraction is not acted on. Subsequent books focus on the respect and friendship that developed between the two and their continued feelings for Ned Nickerson and Callie Shaw. Several spin-off series were cancelled by Simon and Schuster at the end of 1997, including the series Super Mystery (also called Nancy Drew and the Hardy Boys Super Mystery).

== River Heights ==
This series does not feature Nancy Drew beyond a cameo appearance in a couple of books, but is set in her fictional hometown and still written under the Carolyn Keene pseudonym. The series focused on romance and lasted for only 16 titles.

== Nancy Drew on Campus ==
The Nancy Drew on Campus series, like The Nancy Drew Files, is targeted at an older teen audience. Nancy and her friends Bess Marvin and George Fayne go to college; the series focused on college life and romance, rather than all solving mysteries.

== Nancy Drew, Girl Detective (2004–2012) ==
Nancy Drew, Girl Detective replaced the long-running Nancy Drew mysteries series. This new series is written in first person narration, from Nancy's point of view, and features updated and overhauled versions of the main Nancy Drew characters. In addition, new secondary characters are introduced to populate River Heights and appear over multiple books, adding a framework to Nancy's world.

The drastic changes in the main characters' personalities, and a perception in quality decline, earned the series negative reviews from long-time fans. A switch to trilogies gave even more negative reviews, before low sales forced the series to be cancelled in 2011. In 2013, Nancy Drew, Girl Detective was replaced with the Nancy Drew Diaries series.

== Papercutz graphic novels (2005–2010) ==
Beginning in 2005, Papercutz began issuing a new series of Nancy Drew graphic novels as an offshoot of the Girl Detective series. The series is edited by Jim Salicrup, written by Stefan Petrucha, and illustrated by Sho Murase. The manga-style illustrations and technical allusions (Nancy's hybrid car, George's tablet PC) give Nancy and her friends a 21st-century spin.

In 2010, the series was rebooted as Nancy Drew: Girl Detective - The New Case Files. These new novels center around a River Heights that has become obsessed with vampire books. However, the series was cancelled not long after. In 2014, the series began being re-released as an offshoot of the Nancy Drew Diaries series, with two volumes per issue.

== Nancy Drew and the Clue Crew (2006–2015) ==
Starting in 2006, Aladdin Paperbacks published a new series to replace the Nancy Drew Notebooks series for younger readers; it exists in the same universe as the Nancy Drew: Girl Detective series. This series ended in 2015 to be replaced by the Nancy Drew Clue Book series.

Nancy Drew and the Clue Crew features Nancy Drew, George Fayne, and Bess Marvin as eight-year-olds in the third grade at River Heights Elementary School, and solving kid sized mysteries, from finding a stolen ice cream formula entry to the culprit who cut the cake before the bride. This series also sets George's mother working her own catering company, and reveals George's real name to be Georgia.

== Nancy Drew and the Hardy Boys Super Mystery (2007–2012) ==
Nancy Drew and the Hardy Boys Super Mystery is a crossover spin-off with The Hardy Boys: Undercover Brothers series. The stories are told in first person, alternating chapters, between Frank's, Joe's, and Nancy's perspective. The first title in the series acts as an introduction between the characters in their new universes. This series published one title per year until the end of the Girl Detective and Undercover Brothers series in 2012.

== Nancy Drew Diaries (2013–current) ==
This series, which began in 2013, is a reboot of the Nancy Drew: Girl Detective series. The series continues to follow Nancy and her friends' cases, with first-person narration by Nancy. The series was created to move away from the trilogy format of Girl Detective (besides the first two books, all titles are now individual mysteries), make books longer than its predecessor, and have a cover artist. The new series also attempted to fix some of the more criticized aspects of Girl Detective, with arguable success.

This is the first series to be available in three different formats; paperback, hardcover (with dust jacket), and eBooks. When the series was first launched, three new titles were expected to come out per year (with the exception of 2013 and 2015, which produced four new titles), but was later reduced to two titles per year in 2016. The first four titles had an initial printing of 25,000 copies in paperback and 2,500 copies in hardcover; books five through seven had an initial print run of 25,000 in paperback and 5,000 in hardcover; and books eight through eleven had an initial print run of 10,000 in paperback and 5,000 in hardcover.

Books 1-4 were released in a box set in November 2013, and a boxed set of the first ten books was released in August 2016. A further boxed set was issued of the first ten titles with new cover exclusive to the set. This was promoted as a special 90th anniversary edition. In addition, the first three titles were packaged in a single paperback book in June 2016. Also available are unabridged audio books for CD or downloads for the first 26 books and the Christmas special, read by Jorjeana Marie.

Artist Erin McGuire has served as the cover artist since the start of the series.

=== Titles ===
Titles and publication dates
No.	Title	Released	Manuscript	Editor
1	Curse of the Arctic Star	February 5, 2013		Margaret Wright
2	Strangers on a Train	February 5, 2013	Kekla Magoon	Margaret Wright
3	Mystery of the Midnight Rider	May 7, 2013		Margaret Wright
4	Once Upon a Thriller	September 24, 2013		Margaret Wright
5	Sabotage at Willow Woods	January 5, 2014		Margaret Wright
6	Secret at Mystic Lake	May 6, 2014		Margaret Wright
7	The Phantom of Nantucket	September 23, 2014		Amy Cloud
8	The Magician's Secret	January 20, 2015	Stacia Deutsch	Amy Cloud
9	The Clue at Black Creek Farm	May 12, 2015		Amy Cloud
10	A Script for Danger	September 22, 2015	Ami Boghani	Amy Cloud
11	The Red Slippers	December 15, 2015		Amy Cloud
12	The Sign in the Smoke	May 10, 2016		Amy Cloud
13	The Ghost of Grey Fox Inn	October 11, 2016		Amy Cloud
14	Riverboat Roulette	January 3, 2017		Amy Cloud
15	The Professor and the Puzzle	August 8, 2017		Amy Cloud
16	The Haunting on Heliotrope Lane	January 2, 2018		Amy Cloud
	A Nancy Drew Christmas	September 18, 2018	Reuben Sack	Fiona Simpson
17	Famous Mistakes	January 15, 2019		Fiona Simpson
18	The Stolen Show	September 24, 2019		Anna Parsons
19	Hidden Pictures	January 14, 2020		Anna Parsons
20	The Vanishing Statue	June 16, 2020		Anna Parsons
21	Danger at the Iron Dragon	January 12, 2021		Anna Parsons
22	A Capitol Crime	May 25, 2021		Anna Parsons
23	The Blue Lady of Coffin Hall	January 4, 2022		Anna Parsons
24	Captain Stone's Revenge	January 10, 2023	Jan Gangsei	Anna Parsons
25	What Disappears in Vegas . . .	January 23, 2024		Anna Parsons
26	Superstitions of 'The Scottish Play'	January 21, 2025		Anna Parsons
27	Vans & Villains	January 20, 2026		Anna Parsons
28	Major Discord	January 26, 2027		Anna Parsons

==== Notes ====
- Famous Mistakes was initially scheduled to be released in August 2018, though it was later replaced with A Nancy Drew Christmas. It was pushed back to January 2019, and still retained its status as the 17th title in the series.
- A Nancy Drew Christmas was released as an unnumbered, special-edition volume, initially available exclusively in eBook and hardcover formats. The paperback edition was subsequently published in September 2020, two years after the hardcover release. The book also features a guest appearance by characters from The Hardy Boys Adventures series (2013–present).
- Captain Stone's Revenge was initially scheduled to be published in July 2022. It was pushed back to January 2023, consistent with other Simon and Schuster titles scheduled to be published in the later part of 2022. Also impacted was the Hardy Boys Adventures Series The Smuggler's Legacy.

== Nancy Drew Clue Book Series (2015–2024) ==
This is a reboot of the Nancy Drew and the Clue Crew series published by Aladdin Paperbacks. This is an interactive series, as readers may write down their clues and predictions. A page before the final chapter has questions the reader can answer regarding suspects, clues, and solutions. The first two titles were published July 7, 2015, in paperback, hardcover, and eBook editions written by Carolyn Keene with covers and internal illustrations by Peter Francis. The first three titles have had an initial print run of 35,000 in paperback and 5,000 in hardcover. The Nancy Drew Clue Book series was quietly canceled in 2024 by Simon and Schuster. No further titles are planned.

Titles and publication dates
No.	Title	Released
1	Pool Party Puzzler	July 7, 2015
2	Last Lemonade Standing	July 7, 2015
3	A Star Witness	November 3, 2015
4	Big Top Flop	March 1, 2016
5	Movie Madness	July 12, 2016
6	Pets on Parade	October 18, 2016
7	Candy Kingdom Chaos	March 17, 2017
8	World Record Mystery	October 17, 2017
9	Springtime Crime	March 20, 2018
10	Boo Crew	September 4, 2018
11	The Tortoise and the Scare	March 19, 2019
12	Turkey Trot Plot	September 3, 2019
13	Puppy Love Prank	March 17, 2020
14	The Big Island Burglary	July 28, 2020
15	The Great Goat Gaffe	March 9, 2021
16	Duck Derby Debacle	July 13, 2021
17	Recipe Ruckus	March 8, 2022
18	Bird Bonanza	June 6, 2023
19	Chimpanzee Spree	June 11, 2024
	Nancy Drew Clue Book Summer Mysteries 3-in-1: Pool Party Puzzler; Last Lemonade Standing; The Big Island Burglary	May 12, 2026
	Nancy Drew Clue Book Fall Mysteries 3-in-1: Boo Crew; Turkey Trot Plot; A Star Witness	September 8, 2026
	Nancy Drew Clue Book Spring Mysteries 3-in-1: Springtime Crime; Puppy Love Prank; Bird Bonanza	January 19, 2027

== Other books/resources ==
- The Nancy Drew Scrapbook (1993)
- Nancy Drew's Guide to Life (2001)
- Nancy Drew Mad Libs (2005)
- Clues to Real Life: The Wit and Wisdom of Nancy Drew (2007)
- Nancy Drew: A Novelization of the Hit Movie (2007)
- The Lost Files Of Nancy Drew (2007)
- The Official Nancy Drew Handbook (2007)
- Nancy Drew Classic Paper Dolls (2011)
- Nancy Drew & Her Friends Paper Dolls (2012)
- Nancy Drew: The Curse (2020)
