= Nancy Drew Mystery Stories =

Long-running juvenile detective series

The Nancy Drew Mystery Stories is the long-running 'main' series of the Nancy Drew franchise, which was published under the pseudonym Carolyn Keene. There are 175 novels and 34 revised stories that were published between 1930 and 2003 under the banner. Grosset & Dunlap published the first 56, and 34 revised stories, while Simon & Schuster published the series beginning with volume 57.

A spinoff, the Nancy Drew Files, ran concurrently from 1986 to 1997. In 2003, Simon & Schuster announced that Nancy Drew Mystery Stories would end and be replaced by a new, more contemporary series titled Nancy Drew: Girl Detective. Launched in 2004, the series ended in 2012. The Nancy Drew Diaries was launched in its place in 2013.

== Publishing history ==
Mildred Wirt Benson is credited with writing 23 of the first 30 novels in the series. Other authors contributed as well, but in 1959, Edward Stratemeyer's daughter, Harriet Adams, began rewriting or overseeing the writing of the earlier books in the series, sometimes substituting entirely new plots while retaining the same title.

In the Harriet Adams revisions, Nancy is depicted as a less impulsive, less headstrong girl of Stratemeyer and Mildred's vision, to a milder, more sedate and refined girl— "more sugar and less spice", with an extensive wardrobe and a more charitable outlook. Nancy's friend Helen Corning is aged up in preparation for her "write-out" after volume 4 of the revised series (no explanation was made in the original series), and to introduce Bess and her cousin George. Perceived racial stereotypes — and, arguably, characters of color period — were omitted. Action increased significantly and became faster-paced. Greater developmental detail was given to Nancy and her home.

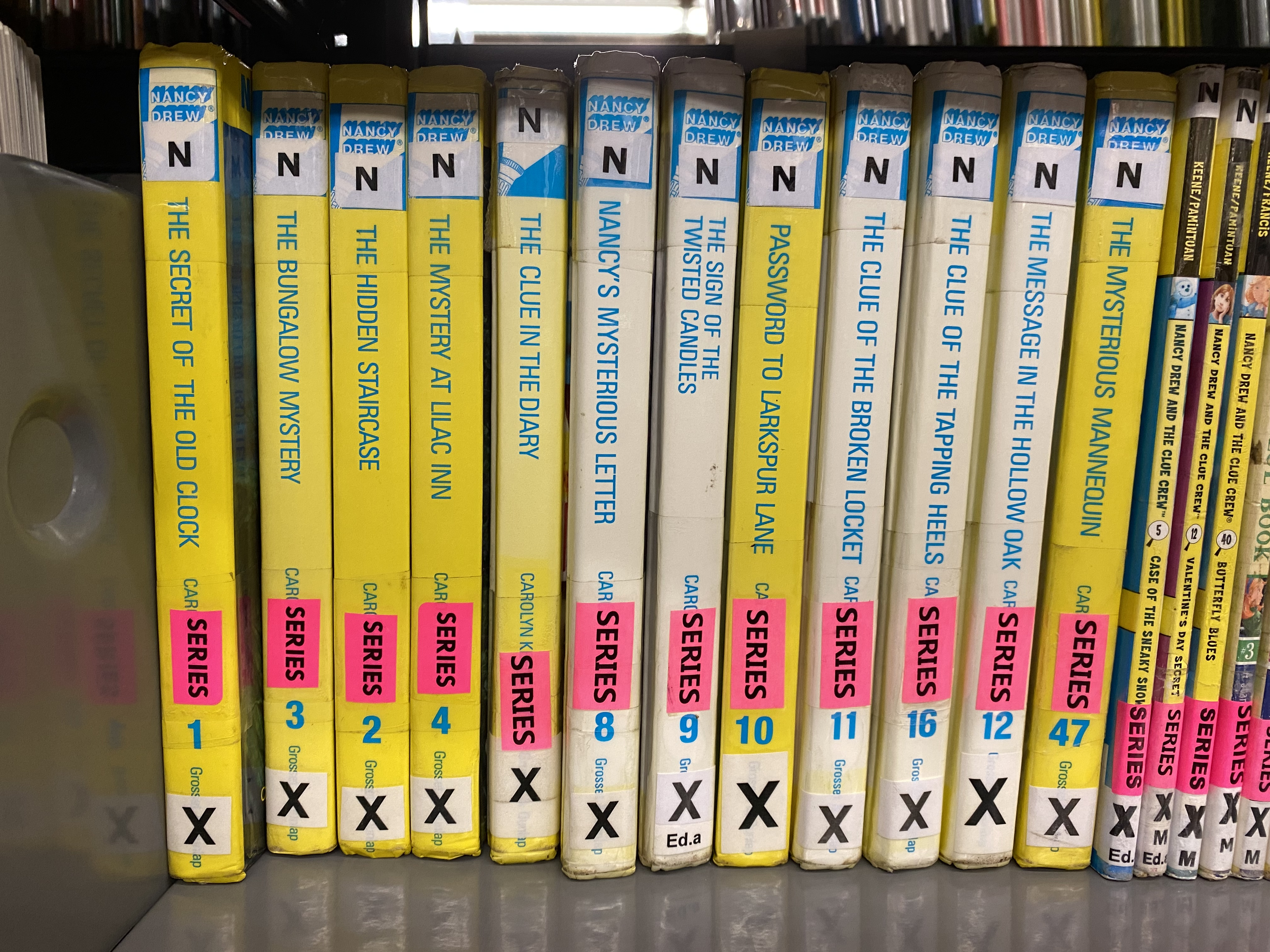
Nancy Drew books on shelf at a public library

In 1979, the Stratemeyer Syndicate left Grosset & Dunlap over contractual and creative disputes, transferring their operations to Simon & Schuster. An ensuing legal battle resolved in 1982 with a court granting Grosset & Dunlap the right to continue publishing the first 56 Nancy Drew titles in hardback, and the publication rights of new stories to Simon & Schuster, or whomever the Syndicate chose. Titles from #57, The Triple Hoax (1979), were thereafter published primarily in paperback. The company initially printed titles under their children's imprint Wanderer, utilizing digest sized paperbacks. Titles were presented in a set cover format referred to as the "Arch" design, with sixteen covers drawn by Ruth Sanderson. Wanderer redesigned and rereleased covers with a new "checkerboard" design before the series moved, from #79 on, to the new Minstrel imprint that continued the "checkerboard" design until #128, moving to a standardized book cover with the series logo and book title on a white background. The series ultimately moved again to Simon & Schuster's Aladdin Paperbacks imprint beginning with #164, with a new design of the Nancy Drew silhouette logo printed over cover art.

Several foreign editions utilized a mass market paperback format, such as the British releases by Armada).

== Grosset & Dunlap titles (1930–1979) ==
The Nancy Drew Mystery Stories were first published in the United States in 1930 by Grosset & Dunlap in a series of hardbacks. Revision of all titles through #34 began in 1959.

Titles, authorship, and publication dates
No.	Title	Pub.	Outline	Manuscript	Editor	Rev.	Revised by
1	The Secret of the Old Clock	1930	Edward Stratemeyer	Mildred Wirt	Edward Stratemeyer	1959	Harriet Stratemeyer Adams
2	The Hidden Staircase	1930	Edward Stratemeyer	Mildred Wirt	Edward Stratemeyer	1959	Harriet Stratemeyer Adams
3	The Bungalow Mystery	1930	Edward Stratemeyer	Mildred Wirt	Edward Stratemeyer	1960	Patricia Doll
4	The Mystery at Lilac Inn	1930	Edward Stratemeyer	Mildred Wirt	Harriet Otis Smith	1961	Patricia Doll
5	The Secret at Shadow Ranch (Note: Retitled The Secret of Shadow Ranch upon revision.)	1931	Harriet Otis Smith	Mildred Wirt	Harriet Otis Smith	1965	Grace Grote
6	The Secret of Red Gate Farm	1931	Edna Stratemeyer Squier	Mildred Wirt	Edna Stratemeyer Squier and Harriet Stratemeyer Adams	1961	Lynn Ealer
7	The Clue in the Diary	1932	Edna Stratemeyer Squier	Mildred Wirt	Edna Stratemeyer Squier and Harriet Stratemeyer Adams	1962	Harriet Stratemeyer Adams
8	Nancy's Mysterious Letter	1932	Edna Stratemeyer Squier	Walter Karig	Edna Stratemeyer Squier and Harriet Stratemeyer Adams	1968	Harriet Stratemeyer Adams
9	The Sign of the Twisted Candles	1933	Edna Stratemeyer Squier	Walter Karig	Edna Stratemeyer Squier and Harriet Stratemeyer Adams	1968	Patricia Doll
10	The Password to Larkspur Lane	1933	Harriet Stratemeyer Adams	Walter Karig	Edna Stratemeyer Squier and Harriet Stratemeyer Adams	1966	Patricia Doll
11	The Clue of the Broken Locket	1934	Edna Stratemeyer Squier	Mildred Wirt	Edna Stratemeyer Squier and Harriet Stratemeyer Adams	1965	Harriet Stratemeyer Adams and Grace Grote
12	The Message in the Hollow Oak	1935	Edna Stratemeyer Squier	Mildred Wirt	Edna Stratemeyer Squier and Harriet Stratemeyer Adams	1972	Grace Grote
13	The Mystery of the Ivory Charm	1936	Edna Stratemeyer Squier	Mildred Wirt	Edna Stratemeyer Squier and Harriet Stratemeyer Adams	1974	Priscilla Baker-Carr
14	The Whispering Statue	1937	Edna Stratemeyer Squier	Mildred Wirt	Edna Stratemeyer Squier and Harriet Stratemeyer Adams	1970	Harriet Stratemeyer Adams
15	The Haunted Bridge	1937 (before the year 1938)	Harriet Stratemeyer Adams	Mildred Wirt	Edna Stratemeyer Squier and Harriet Stratemeyer Adams	1972	Priscilla Baker-Carr
16	The Clue of the Tapping Heels	1939	Edna Stratemeyer Squier	Mildred Wirt	Edna Stratemeyer Squier and Harriet Stratemeyer Adams	1969	Harriet Stratemeyer Adams
17	The Mystery of the Brass-Bound Trunk	1940	Harriet Stratemeyer Adams	Mildred Wirt	Edna Stratemeyer Squier and Harriet Stratemeyer Adams	1976	Harriet Stratemeyer Adams
18	The Mystery at the Moss-Covered Mansion (Note: Retitled Mystery of the Moss-Covered Mansion upon revision.)	1941	Edna Stratemeyer Squier	Mildred Wirt	Edna Stratemeyer Squier and Harriet Stratemeyer Adams	1971	Harriet Stratemeyer Adams
19	The Quest of the Missing Map	1942	Harriet Stratemeyer Adams	Mildred Wirt	Harriet Stratemeyer Adams	1969	Priscilla Baker-Carr
20	The Clue in the Jewel Box	1943	Harriet Stratemeyer Adams	Mildred Wirt	Harriet Stratemeyer Adams	1972	Priscilla Baker-Carr
21	The Secret in the Old Attic	1944	Harriet Stratemeyer Adams	Mildred Wirt	Harriet Stratemeyer Adams	1970	Priscilla Baker-Carr
22	The Clue in the Crumbling Wall	1945	Harriet Stratemeyer Adams	Mildred Wirt	Harriet Stratemeyer Adams	1973	Priscilla Baker-Carr
23	The Mystery of the Tolling Bell	1946	Harriet Stratemeyer Adams	Mildred Wirt	Harriet Stratemeyer Adams	1973	Priscilla Baker-Carr
24	The Clue in the Old Album	1947	Harriet Stratemeyer Adams	Mildred Wirt	Harriet Stratemeyer Adams	1977	Priscilla Baker-Carr
25	The Ghost of Blackwood Hall	1948	Harriet Stratemeyer Adams	Mildred Wirt	Harriet Stratemeyer Adams	1967	Priscilla Baker-Carr
26	The Clue of the Leaning Chimney	1949	Harriet Stratemeyer Adams	George Waller, Jr. and Harriet Stratemeyer Adams	Harriet Stratemeyer Adams	1967	Priscilla Baker-Carr
27	The Secret of the Wooden Lady	1950	Harriet Stratemeyer Adams	Margaret Scherf	Harriet Stratemeyer Adams	1967	Priscilla Baker-Carr
28	The Clue of the Black Keys	1951	Harriet Stratemeyer Adams	Wilhelmina Rankin and Harriet Stratemeyer Adams	Harriet Stratemeyer Adams	1968	Priscilla Baker-Carr
29	The Mystery at the Ski Jump	1952	Harriet Stratemeyer Adams	Alma Sasse	Harriet Stratemeyer Adams	1968	Ann Shultes
30	The Clue of the Velvet Mask	1953	Andrew Svenson	Mildred Wirt	Harriet Stratemeyer Adams	1969	Priscilla Baker-Carr
31	The Ringmaster's Secret	1953	Harriet Stratemeyer Adams	Harriet Stratemeyer Adams	Harriet Stratemeyer Adams	1974	June Dunn
32	The Scarlet Slipper Mystery	1954	Harriet Stratemeyer Adams	Charles Strong	Harriet Stratemeyer Adams	1974	Ann Shultes
33	The Witch Tree Symbol	1955	Harriet Stratemeyer Adams	Harriet Stratemeyer Adams	Harriet Stratemeyer Adams	1975	Ann Shultes
34	The Hidden Window Mystery	1956	Patricia Doll and Harriet Stratemeyer Adams	Harriet Stratemeyer Adams	Harriet Stratemeyer Adams	1975	Mary Fisher
35	The Haunted Showboat	1957 (before the year 1958)	Harriet Stratemeyer Adams	Harriet Stratemeyer Adams	June Dunn and J. Sanderson	n/a	
36	The Secret of the Golden Pavilion	1959	Harriet Stratemeyer Adams	Harriet Stratemeyer Adams	June Dunn and J. Sanderson	n/a	
37	The Clue in the Old Stagecoach	1960	Harriet Stratemeyer Adams	Harriet Stratemeyer Adams	Harriet Stratemeyer Adams	n/a	
38	The Mystery of the Fire Dragon	1961	Harriet Stratemeyer Adams	Harriet Stratemeyer Adams	Harriet Stratemeyer Adams	n/a	
39	The Clue of the Dancing Puppet	1962	Harriet Stratemeyer Adams	Harriet Stratemeyer Adams	Harriet Stratemeyer Adams	n/a	
40	The Moonstone Castle Mystery	1963	Harriet Stratemeyer Adams	Harriet Stratemeyer Adams	Harriet Stratemeyer Adams	n/a	
41	The Clue of the Whistling Bagpipes	1964	Harriet Stratemeyer Adams	Harriet Stratemeyer Adams	Harriet Stratemeyer Adams	n/a	
42	The Phantom of Pine Hill	1965	Harriet Stratemeyer Adams	Harriet Stratemeyer Adams	Harriet Stratemeyer Adams	n/a	
43	The Mystery of the 99 Steps	1966	Harriet Stratemeyer Adams	Harriet Stratemeyer Adams	Harriet Stratemeyer Adams	n/a	
44	The Clue in the Crossword Cipher	1967	Harriet Stratemeyer Adams	Harriet Stratemeyer Adams	Harriet Stratemeyer Adams	n/a	
45	The Spider Sapphire Mystery	1968	Harriet Stratemeyer Adams	Harriet Stratemeyer Adams	Harriet Stratemeyer Adams	n/a	
46	The Invisible Intruder	1969	Harriet Stratemeyer Adams	Harriet Stratemeyer Adams	Harriet Stratemeyer Adams	n/a	
47	The Mysterious Mannequin	1970	Harriet Stratemeyer Adams	Harriet Stratemeyer Adams	Harriet Stratemeyer Adams	n/a	
48	The Crooked Banister	1971	Harriet Stratemeyer Adams	Harriet Stratemeyer Adams	Harriet Stratemeyer Adams	n/a	
49	The Secret of Mirror Bay	1972	Harriet Stratemeyer Adams	Harriet Stratemeyer Adams	Harriet Stratemeyer Adams	n/a	
50	The Double Jinx Mystery	1973	Harriet Stratemeyer Adams	Harriet Stratemeyer Adams	Harriet Stratemeyer Adams	n/a	
51	Mystery of the Glowing Eye	1974	Harriet Stratemeyer Adams	Harriet Stratemeyer Adams	Harriet Stratemeyer Adams	n/a	
52	The Secret of the Forgotten City	1975	Harriet Stratemeyer Adams	Harriet Stratemeyer Adams	Harriet Stratemeyer Adams	n/a	
53	The Sky Phantom	1976	Harriet Stratemeyer Adams	Harriet Stratemeyer Adams	Harriet Stratemeyer Adams	n/a	
54	The Strange Message in the Parchment	1977	Harriet Stratemeyer Adams	Harriet Stratemeyer Adams	Harriet Stratemeyer Adams	n/a	
55	Mystery of Crocodile Island	1978	Harriet Stratemeyer Adams	Harriet Stratemeyer Adams	Harriet Stratemeyer Adams	n/a	
56	The Thirteenth Pearl	1979	Harriet Stratemeyer Adams	Harriet Stratemeyer Adams	Harriet Stratemeyer Adams	n/a	

== Simon & Schuster titles ==
In 1979, the Nancy Drew books began to be published by Wanderer Books Simon & Schuster in paperback format. Though formatted differently from the original 56-volume series which continued under Grosset & Dunlap's control, these new books were published under the Nancy Drew Mystery Stories banner. These books feature increasingly contemporary cover illustrations and some books have multiple versions of the cover art.

These books are sometimes referred to as "Digests", since Simon & Schuster published them as digest-size paperbacks, as opposed to Grosset & Dunlap's hardcover books. (One of the reasons why Adams switched to Simon & Schuster was that Grosset & Dunlap was opposed to such a change, while Simon & Schuster agreed to it.)

In 2005, the first eight volumes from the Wanderer section (#57-64) were republished by Grosset & Dunlap, as a special promotion for the celebration of Nancy Drew's 75th anniversary. These republications went out of print in 2013.

=== Wanderer Books (1979–1985) ===
The Triple Hoax was originally listed as the next book at the end of The Thirteenth Pearl. Grosset & Dunlap continued to list this until they lost a court case against the Syndicate and Simon & Schuster in May 1980. The book was later revised to eliminate The Triple Hoax. However, they later published this book — and the seven after that — in 2005, with the permission and collaboration of Simon & Schuster, in celebration of Nancy Drew's 75th anniversary.

The main plot, formula, and continuity of the books remained similar to the original Grosset & Dunlap books still being published at the time. Harriet Adams was still involved in the Syndicate, even after she stopped writing the books in 1980. Simon & Schuster rejected her original manuscript for The Secret in the Old Lace, with the story being rewritten by Nancy Axelrad. After she died in 1982, the Syndicate continued with five of its partners (Adams' remaining three children, plus authors Axelrad and Lilo Wuenn), until its sale to Simon & Schuster in 1987.

During this period, the Syndicate began to hire new, younger writers, including Sharon Wagner, Richard Ballad, and James Duncan Lawrence. Ballad's two books, Captive Witness and The Sinister Omen, as well as The Emerald-Eyed Cat Mystery, were originally written for The Hardy Boys, but were rewritten for unknown reasons.

The final two books (#77 and #78) were "backdoor pilots" for the spin-off The Nancy Drew Files, which began in 1986. Due to this, and the sale of the Stratemeyer Syndicate, the series went on a two-year hiatus to retool the series.

Titles, authorship, and publication dates (1979–1985)
No.	Title	Pub.	Outline	Manuscript	Editor
57	The Triple Hoax	1979	Harriet Stratemeyer Adams		Harriet Stratemeyer Adams and Lilo Wuenn
58	The Flying Saucer Mystery	1980	Harriet Stratemeyer Adams		Lilo Wuenn
59	The Secret in the Old Lace	1980	Harriet Stratemeyer Adams	Harriet Stratemeyer Adams & Nancy Axelrad (Note: The publisher rejected an original manuscript by Adams, but elements of hers remained in the rewritten manuscript by Axelrad.)	Lilo Wuenn
60	The Greek Symbol Mystery	1981	Harriet Stratemeyer Adams and Nancy Axelrad	Nancy Axelrad	Lilo Wuenn
61	The Swami's Ring	1981	Harriet Stratemeyer Adams and Nancy Axelrad	Nancy Axelrad	Lilo Wuenn
62	The Kachina Doll Mystery	1981	Sharon Wagner		Nancy Axelrad
63	The Twin Dilemma	1981	Nancy Axelrad		Lilo Wuenn
64	Captive Witness	1981	Richard Ballad		Nancy Axelrad
65	Mystery of the Winged Lion	1982	Nancy Axelrad		Nancy Axelrad
66	Race Against Time	1982	James Duncan Lawrence		Nancy Axelrad
67	The Sinister Omen	1982	Richard Ballad		Nancy Axelrad
68	The Elusive Heiress	1982	Sharon Wagner		Nancy Axelrad
69	Clue in the Ancient Disguise	1982	James Duncan Lawrence		Nancy Axelrad
70	The Broken Anchor	1983	Sharon Wagner		Nancy Axelrad
71	The Silver Cobweb	1983	James Duncan Lawrence		Nancy Axelrad
72	The Haunted Carousel	1983	James Duncan Lawrence		Nancy Axelrad
73	Enemy Match	1984	Donetta Bowers		Nancy Axelrad
74	The Mysterious Image	1984	James Duncan Lawrence		Nancy Axelrad
75	The Emerald-Eyed Cat Mystery	1984	Sharon Wagner		Nancy Axelrad
76	The Eskimo's Secret	1985	Sharon Wagner		Nancy Axelrad
77	The Bluebeard Room	1985	James Duncan Lawrence		Nancy Axelrad
78	The Phantom of Venice	1985 (before both years 1986 and 1987	James Duncan Lawrence		Nancy Axelrad

=== Minstrel Books (1987–2001) ===
After volume 78, the series took a 2 1/2-year hiatus due to the sale of the Stratemeyer Syndicate to Simon & Schuster, and to begin The Nancy Drew Files spin-off. At this point, book packager Mega-Books took over the series, and hired different ghostwriters for the job (many of whom are still unknown). The ghostwriters who are known are ones who have either been discovered through other resources or have publicly revealed themselves as a ghostwriter for the series.

The series also gained Anne Greenberg as the new editor; Greenberg would oversee the series for the next 16 years and become one of the most influential Nancy Drew editors that helped the books continue until the 21st century.

Due to the cancellation of The Nancy Drew Files in 1997, Simon & Schuster rewrote several unpublished manuscripts into books for the original series. These include The Wild Cat Crime (#141), The E-mail Mystery (#144), and The Case of the Captured Queen (#148).

The writing style of these books took a different direction than the books of the Syndicate; modern technology is mentioned (making the books seem somewhat dated very quickly), continuity errors are common, and the books become shorter (reducing the books from a 20-chapter/180-page format to a 16-chapter/150-page format). In the late 1990s, continuity errors and text errors became more common.

Titles, authorship, and publication dates (1987–2001)
No.	Title	Pub.	Outline	Manuscript
79	The Double Horror of Fenley Place	1987	Unknown	
80	The Case of the Disappearing Diamonds	1987	Unknown	
81	The Mardi Gras Mystery	1988	Unknown	
82	The Clue in the Camera	1988	Unknown	
83	The Case of the Vanishing Veil	1988	Unknown	
84	The Joker's Revenge	1988	Carin Greenberg Baker	Eileen Hehl
85	The Secret of Shady Glen	1988	Unknown	
86	The Mystery of Misty Canyon	1988	Unknown	
87	The Case of the Rising Stars	1989	unknown	Carin Greenberg Baker
88	The Search for Cindy Austin	1988	Nancy Bush	
89	The Case of the Disappearing Deejay	1989	Carol Gorman	
90	The Puzzle at Pineview School	1989	Unknown	
91	The Girl Who Couldn't Remember	1989	Unknown	
92	The Ghost of Craven Cove	1989	Unknown	
93	The Case of the Safecracker's Secret	1990	Carin Greenberg Baker	
94	The Picture-Perfect Mystery	1990	Carol Gorman	
95	The Silent Suspect	1990	Unknown	
96	The Case of the Photo Finish	1990	Unknown	
97	The Mystery at Magnolia Mansion	1990	Alison Hart	
98	The Haunting of Horse Island	1990	Carol Gorman	
99	The Secret at Seven Rocks	1991	Ellen Steiber	
100	A Secret in Time	1991	Carin Greenberg Baker	
101	The Mystery of the Missing Millionairess	1991	Unknown	
102	The Secret in the Dark	1991	Unknown	
103	The Stranger in the Shadows	1991	Alison Hart	
104	The Mystery of the Jade Tiger	1991	Ellen Steiber	
105	The Clue in the Antique Trunk	1992	Unknown	
106	The Case of the Artful Crime	1992	Unknown	
107	The Legend of Miner's Creek	1992	Unknown	
108	The Secret of the Tibetan Treasure	1992	Unknown	
109	The Mystery of the Masked Rider	1992	Alison Hart	
110	The Nutcracker Ballet Mystery	1992	Unknown	
111	The Secret at Solaire	1993	Unknown	
112	Crime in the Queen's Court	1993	Unknown	
113	The Secret Lost at Sea	1993	Unknown	
114	The Search for the Silver Persian	1993	Unknown	
115	The Suspect in the Smoke	1993	Unknown	
116	The Case of the Twin Teddy Bears	1993	Alison Hart	
117	Mystery on the Menu	1994	Unknown	
118	Trouble at Lake Tahoe	1994	Unknown	
119	The Mystery of the Missing Mascot	1994	Unknown	
120	The Case of the Floating Crime	1994	Unknown	
121	The Fortune Teller's Secret	1994	Unknown	
122	The Message in the Haunted Mansion	1994	Unknown	
123	The Clue on the Silver Screen	1995	Unknown	
124	The Secret of the Scarlet Hand	1995	Unknown	
125	The Teen Model Mystery	1995	Unknown	
126	The Riddle in the Rare Book	1995	Unknown	
127	The Case of the Dangerous Solution	1995	Unknown	
128	The Treasure in the Royal Tower	1995	Unknown	
129	The Baby-Sitter Burglaries	1996	Pamela Willis	
130	The Sign of the Falcon	1996	Unknown	
131	The Hidden Inheritance	1996	Unknown	
132	The Fox Hunt Mystery	1996	Unknown	
133	The Mystery at the Crystal Palace	1996	Unknown	
134	The Secret of the Forgotten Cave	1996	Unknown	
135	The Riddle of the Ruby Gazelle	1997	Unknown	
136	The Wedding Day Mystery	1997	Unknown	
137	In Search of the Black Rose	1997	Unknown	
138	The Legend of the Lost Gold	1997	Unknown	
139	The Secret of Candlelight Inn	1997	Unknown	
140	The Door-to-Door Deception	1997	Unknown	
141	The Wild Cat Crime	1998	Unknown	
142	The Case of Capital Intrigue	1998	Elizabeth Nugent	
143	Mystery on Maui	1998	Elizabeth Nugent	
144	The E-mail Mystery	1998	Denise Hidalgo	
145	The Missing Horse Mystery	1998	Alison Hart	
146	The Ghost of the Lantern Lady	1998	Unknown	
147	The Case of the Captured Queen	1999	Unknown	
148	On the Trail of Trouble	1999	Unknown	
149	The Clue of the Gold Doubloons	1999	Alison Hart	
150	Mystery at Moorsea Manor	1999	Unknown	
151	The Chocolate-Covered Contest	1999	Unknown	
152	The Key in the Satin Pocket	2000	Unknown	
153	Whispers In the Fog	2000	Unknown	
154	The Legend of the Emerald Lady	2000	Unknown	
155	The Mystery in Tornado Alley	2000	George Edward Stanley	
156	The Secret in the Stars	2000	Unknown	
157	The Music Festival Mystery	2000	Unknown	
158	The Curse of the Black Cat	2001	Unknown	
159	The Secret of the Fiery Chamber	2001	Unknown	

=== Aladdin Books (2001–2003) ===
With the new millennium, the series changed publishers to the Aladdin subdivision of Simon & Schuster. With declining sales and the departure of longtime editor Anne Greenberg, Simon & Schuster ended the original series in November 2003.

Continuity errors are common throughout these books: in No Strings Attached and Danger on the Great Lakes (both written by George Edward Stanley), Nancy and her friends are 17 rather than 18; Ned is also mentioned to be as the same age as Nancy and works as an intern at a company; and George has chestnut hair (rather than brown). In Werewolf in a Winter Wonderland, Ned is blond, and it is suggested that Nancy might be in college. Numerous typographic errors and mistakes are also found throughout these books.

Titles, authorship, and publication dates (2001–2003)
No.	Title	Pub.	Outline	Manuscript	Editor
160	The Clue on the Crystal Dove	2001	Unknown		Anne Greenberg
161	Lost in the Everglades	2001	Unknown		Anne Greenberg
162	The Case of the Lost Song	2001	Unknown		Anne Greenberg
163	The Clues Challenge	2001	Unknown		Anne Greenberg
164	The Mystery of the Mother Wolf	2002	Unknown		Anne Greenberg
165	The Crime Lab Case	2002	Unknown		Anne Greenberg
166	The Case of the Creative Crime	2002	Unknown		Anne Greenberg
167	Mystery by Moonlight	2002	Unknown		Anne Greenberg
168	The Bike Tour Mystery	2002	Unknown		Anne Greenberg
169	The Mistletoe Mystery	2002	Unknown		Anne Greenberg
170	No Strings Attached	2003	George Edward Stanley		Unknown
171	Intrigue at the Grand Opera	2003	Unknown		Unknown
172	The Riding Club Crime	2003	Unknown		Unknown
173	Danger on the Great Lakes	2003	George Edward Stanley		Unknown
174	A Taste of Danger	2003	Unknown		Unknown
175	Werewolf in a Winter Wonderland	2003	Unknown		Unknown

== Foreign publications ==
=== United Kingdom ===
The Nancy Drew Mystery Series was published in a series of hardbacks and paperbacks in the United Kingdom, starting in 1971 and 1973. The British publisher was Collins, and its paperback imprint Armada Books (which also published the Hardy Boys and Three Investigators, among other series). When the Nancy Drew series was published in England, the order was changed significantly and the titles' numbering was revised from the American standard, as Armada was "obliged to publish No. 51 onwards before publishing Nos. 41-50".

Thus, the original fifty-six American Grosset & Dunlap-published titles become the first fifty UK titles, with #57-78 being published as #51-72. Collins, therefore, had a deal in place with both American publishers and, indeed, were obliged "for contractual reasons" to publish some of the later Simon & Schuster titles before some of the Grosset & Dunlap ones. Collins/Armada published the twenty-two Simon & Schuster/Wanderer titles in sequence, albeit off by six, and then finished publishing the six "missing" Grosset & Dunlap titles (including the first, The Secret of the Old Clock).

The twenty-two (US) Wanderer imprint titles were produced between 1979 and 1985, after which the main Nancy Drew Mystery Stories went on a short hiatus. During this time, Simon & Schuster began publishing The Nancy Drew Files series for older teenagers, and subsequently re-aligned the main series, moving it to a new imprint in 1987, with The Double Horror of Fenley Place, the first Nancy Drew title published under the American Minstrel imprint. Accordingly, after publishing twenty-two Wanderer (and seventy-eight overall) titles in the main Nancy Drew series, the Collins/Armada licence terminated in June 1992. The following month, Simon & Schuster itself began publishing the more recent Minstrel imprint titles under their Pocket Books UK imprint, starting with the now numerically-aligned #79.

== Special editions and reprints ==
=== Reader's Club ===
Nancy Drew was issued as a book club feature, the Nancy Drew Reader's Club, from 1959 to early 1961. In all, twelve volumes were issued, six in 1959 and six in 1960. These volumes were issued with new illustrations by artist Polly Bolian. The volumes matched Grosset & Dunlap's other Doubleday Book Club publication, Young Library. A full color jacket illustration was repeated as the frontispiece, and double-page pen and ink drawings highlighted the texts. References or notices for other volumes, and volume numbering, was removed from the text and the jackets.

Plans for additional titles were abandoned after two years and the series ceased publication in early 1961. The volumes are highly desired by today's collectors due to their original artwork and the scarcity of their dust jackets, made on inferior, lightweight matte paper instead of heavier-gauge glossy paper used on other editions. The books with jackets are considered scarce, those with a 1960 date being much more difficult to find by collectors.

=== Book club editions ===
Nancy Drew was issued in the yellow-spine picture format, as a book club, in 1962. The back covers were solid yellow, and spines feature no volume numbers. "Book Club Edition" appears on the title page. Only Volumes 1–32 were issued. In the 1970s, a book club offer was available directly from the publisher, but these volumes were exactly the same as regularly purchased volumes; they were simply mailed on schedule to the subscriber.

=== Twin Thriller ===
Several Nancy Drew books were published as two-volumes-in-one in the 1970s. Covers featured geometric clover designs on lilac grey, with a vignette from one of the two volumes' original cover art. All of the volumes are sequential, i.e., 1–2, 3–4, except for the final two issued. Volumes 17 and 24 appear together as one, as they were not revised until the mid-1970s.

=== Applewood Books reprints ===
Applewood Books began reprinting facsimile editions of the early Nancy Drew and Hardy Boys in 1991. The books feature the original dust jacket art, original illustrations (although not scattered through the text), original texts, and duplication binding of the early Nancy Drew format. Many of the volumes contain forewords from adult author fans of the series, such as Sara Paretsky. Applewood issued original series titles up to #21, The Secret in the Old Attic. Although Volumes 22 and 23, The Clue in the Crumbling Wall and The Mystery of the Tolling Bell, respectively, were featured in the 2006–2007 catalogue, these additional titles were not ultimately published as company representatives stated that sales of later volumes had tapered and plans to extend the line were discontinued in 2007.

=== Literarture lithographs ===
In late 2006, Literarture, licensed by Simon & Schuster, began releasing prints of classic Nancy Drew dust jacket artwork by Russell Tandy, Bill Gillies and Rudy Nappi derived from pristine vintage art elements and, in some cases, following extensive research, the original paintings themselves. The jackets were issued as limited-edition offset lithographs.

=== Grosset & Dunlap reissues ===
In early 2007, Grosset and Dunlap began retailing special volumes of Nancy Drew mysteries with original artwork but revised content in different product assortments and packaging.

=== Novelty title ===
In 2023, Simon & Schuster partnered with Wandering Planet Toys to publish a small book in conjunction with a line of collector dolls based on the covers by Rudy Nappi. Jan Gangsei ghostwrote the book titled Case of the Curious Collection, which was labelled as "56.5" in a nod to the original series.
