= Sharon Wagner =

American writer

Sharon Blythe Wagner (born 1936) is an American author of more than 60 mystery, Gothic romance, and young adult fiction titles. She wrote five titles in the Nancy Drew Mystery Stories series under the pseudonym Carolyn Keene. Wagner's Nancy Drew titles are The Kachina Doll Mystery (1981), The Elusive Heiress (1982), The Broken Anchor (1983), The Emerald-Eyed Cat (1984), and The Eskimo's Secret (1985).

Wagner was born in Wallace, Idaho, grew up in Cut Bank, Montana and lives in Mesa, Arizona. Wagner began publishing in approximately 1965. After writing scores of magazine short stories, Prairie Wind (1968), illustrated by friend and neighbor Rita Warner, was her first full-length book. Under her own name, Wagner also authored the Gypsy series of mysteries. The action is set on a Western ranch. Horse Illustrated called Gypsy from Nowhere one of the 30 best "horse books." Wagner has also published under the names Casey Stephens, M.E. Cooper, Ann Sheldon, Blythe Stephens, and Blythe Bradley.
