= The Treasure in the Royal Tower =

The Treasure in the Royal Tower may refer to:

- The Treasure in the Royal Tower (novel), a novel by Carolyn Keene in the Nancy Drew series
- Nancy Drew: Treasure in the Royal Tower, a Nancy Drew point-and-click adventure game, loosely based on the novel
