= The Mystery of the Ivory Charm =

Nancy Drew 13, published 1936

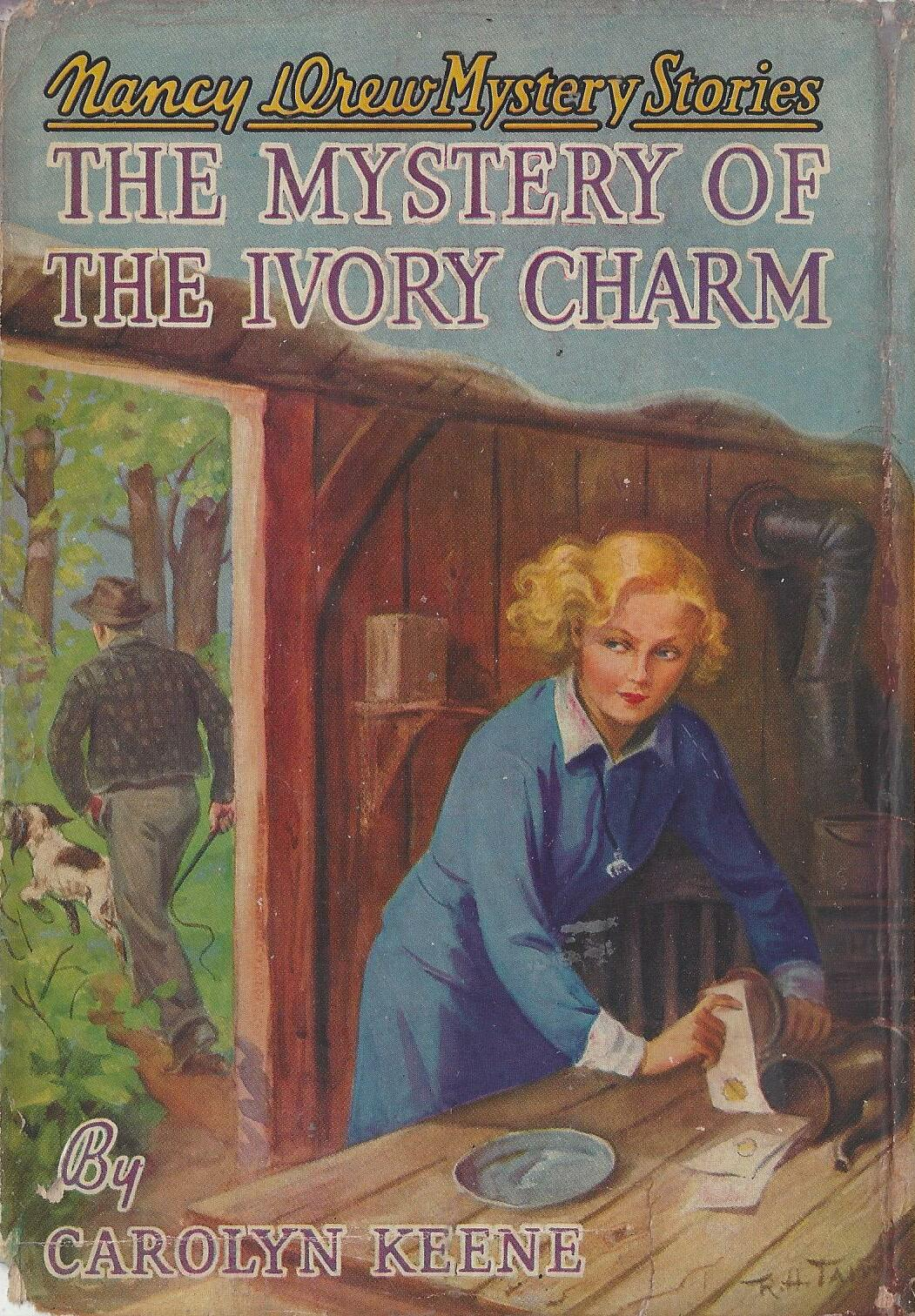
- Original edition cover
- Author: Carolyn Keene
- Illustrator: Russell H. Tandy
- Language: English
- Series: Nancy Drew Mystery Stories
- Genre: Juvenile literature
- Publisher: Grosset & Dunlap
- Publication date: 1936, 1974
- Publication place: United States
- Media type: Print (hardback & paperback)
- Preceded by: The Message in the Hollow Oak
- Followed by: The Whispering Statue

The Mystery of the Ivory Charm is the thirteenth volume in the Nancy Drew Mystery Stories series. It was first published in 1936 under the pseudonym Carolyn Keene. The actual author was ghostwriter Mildred Wirt Benson.

As agreed in 1993, an acknowledgement was made to Mildred Wirt Benson in the 2002 printing which reads as follows:

"Acknowledgement is made to Mildred Wirt Benson, who under the pen name Carolyn Keene, wrote the original NANCY DREW books."

== Plot summary - 1936 edition ==
The plot finds Nancy, Bess, and George investigating a mysterious boy from India. The boy, Coya, works for a traveling circus, and is treated poorly by his guardian, Rai, also a native of India, who is in charge of the circus. Coya runs away from his abusive guardian and seeks asylum at the Drew home in River Heights. Soon after his arrival, the girls begin investigating property owned by the unusual Miss Anita Allison. They encounter a house "with no insides," and a hidden tunnel. The property mysteriously catches fire, revealing a hidden cache of jewels. Nancy traces Coya's parentage and uncovers a sinister kidnapping plot involving both Miss Allison and Rai. The climax also reveals a secret about the ivory charm, and its mysterious powers.

== 1974 revision ==
This version is similar to the original text. Some character names are updated or altered (Coya was renamed Rishi) and Miss Allison became Mrs. Allison, but the plot is largely a condensed, modernized version of the previous edition. Harriet Stratemeyer Adams and her employees at the Stratemeyer Syndicate completed the revisions.

== Artwork ==
The 1936 edition featured cover art by Russell H. Tandy, and for a few printings, four glossy illustrations by him. Tandy updated his frontispiece to a plain pen and ink drawing for printings after 1943. Rudy Nappi illustrated new cover art for the volume's picture cover binding in 1962, and again for the 1974 revision. An uncredited illustrator completed interior illustrations for the revision.
