= The Clue in the Old Album =

Nancy Drew 24, published 1947

- Original edition cover
- Author: Carolyn Keene
- Cover artist: Russell H. Tandy
- Language: English
- Series: Nancy Drew Mystery Stories
- Genre: Juvenile literature
- Publisher: Grosset & Dunlap
- Publication date: 1947
- Media type: Print (hardback & paperback)
- ISBN: 0-448-09524-6
- Preceded by: The Mystery of the Tolling Bell
- Followed by: The Ghost of Blackwood Hall

The Clue in the Old Album is the twenty-fourth volume in the Nancy Drew Mystery Stories series. It was first published in 1947 under the pseudonym Carolyn Keene.
