= The Quest of the Missing Map =

Nancy Drew 19, published 1942

- Original edition cover
- Author: Carolyn Keene
- Cover artist: Russell H. Tandy
- Language: English
- Series: Nancy Drew Mystery Stories
- Genre: Juvenile literature
- Published: 1942 Grosset & Dunlap
- Publication place: United States
- Media type: Print (hardback & paperback)
- ISBN: 0-448-09519-X
- OCLC: 38463003
- Preceded by: The Mystery at the Moss-Covered Mansion
- Followed by: The Clue in the Jewel Box

The Quest of the Missing Map is the nineteenth volume in the Nancy Drew Mystery Stories series. It was first published in 1942 under the pseudonym Carolyn Keene. The actual author was ghostwriter Mildred Wirt Benson.

== Plot summary ==
Nancy investigates a small ship cottage at the Chatham estate and discovers a connection between the mysterious occurrences at the cottage and an island where a lost treasure is said to be buried. With one half of a map, Nancy sets out to find a missing twin brother who holds the other half. The mystery becomes dangerous when an assailant hears about the treasure and is determined to push Nancy off the trail. Nancy is accosted multiple times by a husband and wife couple, the Browns. They kidnap her from a party, though she manages to escape. Later in the novel, she foolishly decides to enter a house and is captured by the duo once again. They leave her bound and gagged in the house as they make their escape in an attempt to find the map themselves. Can Nancy endure this and other grave dangers, and recover in time to solve the mystery?
