= The Clue of the Leaning Chimney =

Nancy Drew 26, published 1949

- Original edition cover
- Author: Carolyn Keene
- Cover artist: Russell H. Tandy
- Language: English
- Series: Nancy Drew Mystery Stories
- Genre: Juvenile literature
- Publisher: Grosset & Dunlap
- Publication date: 1949
- Publication place: United States
- Media type: Print (hardback & paperback)
- ISBN: 0-448-09526-2
- OCLC: 34313366
- Preceded by: The Ghost of Blackwood Hall
- Followed by: The Secret of the Wooden Lady

The Clue of the Leaning Chimney is the twenty-sixth volume in the Nancy Drew Mystery Stories series. It was first published in 1949 under the pseudonym Carolyn Keene. The actual authors were ghostwriters George Waller, Jr. and Harriet Stratemeyer Adams.
