= The Clue of the Tapping Heels =

Nancy Drew 16, published 1939

- Original edition cover
- Author: Carolyn Keene
- Cover artist: Russell H. Tandy
- Language: English
- Series: Nancy Drew Mystery Stories
- Genre: Juvenile literature
- Publisher: Grosset & Dunlap
- Publication date: 1939, 1969
- Publication place: United States
- Media type: Print (hardback & paperback)
- ISBN: 0-448-09516-5
- OCLC: 39921931
- Preceded by: The Haunted Bridge
- Followed by: The Mystery of the Brass Bound Trunk

The Clue of the Tapping Heels is the 16th volume in the Nancy Drew Mystery Stories series. It was first published in 1939. An updated, revised, and largely different story was published under the same title in 1970. A facsimile edition of the 1939 version was published by Applewood Books. As of 2006, this title is still in print.

== Plot summary: 1939 edition ==
Nancy and her friends Bess and George stumble across a Persian cat on the road. They return the cat to Annie Carter, an elderly woman who keeps twenty-five cats in her house. The girls befriend the kindly Miss Carter, but while at her house, they are disrupted by neighbors who are annoyed with the cats. It is here that Nancy uncovers her next mystery. Fred Bunce, one of the neighbors, had taken care of a boy named Gus Woonton, who was reportedly mentally and physically challenged. Miss Carter took a liking to the boy while he was with Fred Bunce and his wife, so she paid for him to live at the Riverside Institution, in hopes of Gus receiving proper care for his ailments. Miss Carter receives a telegram that Gus Woonton has died, and Fred Bunce seems quite eager to pay for funeral expenses, which makes Nancy suspicious.

Once the neighbors leave, Nancy meets a man in front of Miss Carter's home asking for a Lady Violette. Nancy informs him that there is no such person at this address, only to be informed that Miss Carter, a former actress, played a character named Lady Violette in one of her past plays. Nancy quickly tracks down the man, Horace St. Will, and he and Miss Carter are happily reunited. Mr. St. Will tells Nancy that he used to know a Ralph Woonton, which was the name of Gus's father. Mr. St. Will gives Nancy and her father some old letters from Ralph Woonton; however he tells them that Ralph Woonton and his wife never had a son. Nancy believes that Gus Woonton received an inheritance in trust from his parents, which was stolen by Fred Bunce. Her suspicions grow stronger when she trails Bunce into a stock market firm, where she sees the considerable amount of money he has lost in faulty stocks. But soon after the episode, the Bunces mysteriously leave their rental home. Nancy, Bess and George investigate the vacated dwelling, where they find two of Miss Carter's Persian kittens, and return them to her.

Miss Carter has very little money, as she sends regular checks to a young actress named Beverly Barrett in New York City. Miss Carter injured her leg when she first met Nancy, so the girl detective engages Mrs. Bealing, a cousin of Hannah Gruen's, to take care of her and her cats. The action soon takes Nancy to New York and a cruise ship, where she meets further peril in her attempt to restore the child's funds, and help restore Miss Carter's financial position. Nancy is caught spying by Fred Bunce. He says that she will not get the chance to put him behind bars, and drags her to his car. Nancy struggles and screams, but he quickly ties her up and gags her. He drives her to a cruise ship and leaves her bound and gagged inside a locked cabin aboard the ship. Nancy's tapping becomes the means by which she is rescued, and leads to finding the missing child.

== 1969 revision ==
Nancy is appearing as a tap dancer in a charity show. Along with chums Bess and George, she begins investigating strange tapping sounds at the elderly Ms. Carter's home. Ms.Carter is a cat enthusiast who owns mostly valuable breeding stock. Nancy determines a hoax is afoot, attacks are occurring at the charity show, and the mysterious tapping sounds continue. Could they be coded messages?

== Artwork ==
The original Russell H. Tandy cover art shows an animated and visibly angry Nancy accompanied Bess and George. They are seizing a ladder at Nancy's house by moonlight. Discussions among collectors draw the conclusion that elements of this depiction were incorrect because the publisher's art department dictated that the scene must show Nancy with her friends. Also, the house does not match the description of Nancy Drew's home. The revised cover artwork by Rudy Nappi for the 1962 picture cover shows the same scene, corrected to match the actual text, but lacking action. Nancy, alone, sees the ladder outside her home at night. For the 1969 revised edition, the cover art is very vivid and somewhat psychedelic, with images of Nancy tap dancing, and a head shot beneath a large Persian cat head, all on a sunflower-yellow background. This version was also painted by Nappi.

== Critique ==
Adult collectors of nostalgia and juvenile series fiction often discuss book titles in fanzines or list serves. The original Clue of the Tapping Heels places much focus on cats, and also on a "lost love" subplot involving Miss Carter and her former leading man. A minor element of political incorrectness exists in that one crook, wearing partial make-up and wig, is described as a freckle-faced, colored man. Incense is used as a drug against Nancy and George, an element removed from the revision, as drugs were popular in teen culture at the time. Further, a young boy suffering from developmental and intellectual disabilities regains his full faculties after surgery, which is highly unlikely.

The revision also draws criticism, mostly from liberal circles, due to what some feel are overt placements of Nancy commenting on her desire to attend church as often as she can, and contains much physical action and danger, but is generally somewhat more believable in tone.
