= The Ghost of Blackwood Hall =

Nancy Drew 25, published 1948

- Original edition cover
- Author: Carolyn Keene
- Cover artist: Russell H. Tandy
- Language: English
- Series: Nancy Drew Mystery Stories
- Genre: Juvenile literature
- Publisher: Grosset & Dunlap
- Publication date: 1948
- Publication place: United States
- Media type: Print (hardback & paperback)
- ISBN: 0-448-09525-4
- Preceded by: The Clue in the Old Album
- Followed by: The Clue of the Leaning Chimney

The Ghost of Blackwood Hall is the twenty-fifth volume in the Nancy Drew Mystery Stories series. It was first published in 1948 under the pseudonym Carolyn Keene. The actual author was ghostwriter Mildred Wirt Benson.

== Plot summary ==
Nancy Drew's jeweler's customer Mrs. Putney asks Nancy and her friends to help recover her stolen jewels. The search for the thieves takes Nancy, Bess, and George to New Orleans. Mrs. Putney's odd behavior and two young women involve Nancy in a case involving a cruel hoax being perpetrated at the abandoned Blackwood Hall. Nancy's father, Carson Drew, also helps solve this mystery by contacting his workers, and helping him find the man that is connected to this mysterious affair.
