= The Whispering Statue =

Nancy Drew 14, published 1937

- Original edition cover
- Author: Carolyn Keene
- Illustrator: Russel H. Tandy
- Cover artist: Russell H. Tandy
- Language: English
- Series: Nancy Drew Mystery Stories
- Genre: Juvenile literature
- Publisher: Grosset & Dunlap
- Publication date: 1937, 1970
- Publication place: United States
- Media type: Print (hardback & paperback)
- Pages: 179
- ISBN: 0-448-09514-9
- OCLC: 514896
- LC Class: PZ7.K23 Nan no. 14 1970
- Preceded by: The Mystery of the Ivory Charm
- Followed by: The Haunted Bridge

The Whispering Statue is the fourteenth volume in the Nancy Drew Mystery Stories series. It was written by Mildred Wirt Benson, whom many readers and scholars consider the "truest" of the numerous Carolyn Keene ghostwriters, following an outline by Harriet Stratemeyer. The book was originally published by Grosset & Dunlap in 1937. An updated, revised, and largely different story was published under the same title in 1970.

== Plot summary - 1937 edition ==
Nancy, Bess, and George encounter a troublesome stray terrier on their way to the opening festivities of a new park and recreation complex in River Heights. The terrier grabs the handbag of one of the guest speakers and loses it in a nearby pond. Nancy helps groundskeepers retrieve the handbag and uses the notes found inside to prompt the nervous speaker during her address. She also finds a mysterious personal ad in the handbag. In a casual observation, the "clubwoman," a Mrs. Owen, tells Nancy about a statue on a deserted seaside estate. The statue, known as "The Whispering Girl," bears an uncanny resemblance to Nancy. As it turns out, Nancy is bound for that very area with her father and her friends Bess and George.

Reluctantly, Nancy decides to keep the terrier for a little while, dubbing him Togo (after a famous Alaskan Husky, who in turn was named after a Japanese admiral). Togo follows her to the train station, and she has no choice but to bring him to Sea Cliff with her. On the train, the girls observe a strange elderly woman identified as a Miss Morse, and they suspect a man who has just approached the woman is trying to swindle her.

Once in Sea Cliff, the girls hunt for the statue that resembles Nancy – and for Miss Morse, who has excited Nancy's curiosity and protectiveness. Further mysterious complications occur when Miss Morse acknowledges that she is being swindled but dismisses Nancy and when Nancy happens to overhear the crook from the train boasting about his conquest. There are several encounters with quirky but ultimately helpful older men. A seaplane accident leads Nancy to rescue a client of her father who is then linked both to Mrs. Owen and to the mysterious Miss Morse. In the long climactic sequence of the story, Nancy ventures to a cliffside mansion to confront Miss Miss Morse and Mitza. This proves to be a tactical blunder on Nancy's part as she is quickly taken prisoner by the pair. While Nancy tries to talk the two down, the police suddenly show up at the house. Quickly Miss Morse claps her hand over Nancy's mouth so the girl cannot scream. She and Mitza tie and gag Nancy and lock her in a closet. With her mouth gagged, Nancy cannot call out to the officers as they search the grounds, and they eventually give up. Once they leave, Mitza and Miss Morse leave Nancy alone in the closet. Nancy manages to struggle free of her bonds, and slips out of the mansion without the pair noticing. Hiding on the grounds, she then sees Mitza making his way along the hedge. Having an idea to trick him, Nancy hides behind the statue and uses her voice to make the statue appear to speak to the con man. However, the man sees through the ruse, seizes Nancy and drags her inside the house. She screams, to no avail. Miss Morse is bed-ridden by this point, so Mitza overpowers Nancy and keeps her gagged and bound this time to a chair in the middle of the room, so he can keep an eye on her. As the climax progresses, the cliffside mansion falls into the ocean, necessitating another dramatic rescue.

This edition of the novel is considered one of the most ragged, overpopulated, and coincidence-heavy of the series. It does, however, introduce the enduringly popular Togo, who becomes a mainstay in the series thereafter. The book is full of atypically harsh episodes, including a man who beats Togo cruelly, apparent elder and child abuse, and some saucy behavior by Nancy herself. It is perhaps the book most extensively overhauled for the reissue.

== Artwork ==
The original 1937 cover art is by Russell H. Tandy, and shows Nancy crouched behind a statue, speaking to a man. Rudy Nappi illustrated the same scene for the 1962 picture cover edition, with updated clothing and hairstyles. Nappi also illustrated the cover of the 1970 edition, which is predominantly blue and white, featuring Nancy's profile behind an overlay of a statue.
