= The Haunted Bridge =

Nancy Drew 15, published 1937

The Haunted Bridge (A Book)
- Original edition cover
- Author: Carolyn Keene
- Illustrator: Russell H. Tandy
- Language: English
- Series: Nancy Drew Mystery Stories
- Genre: Juvenile literature
- Publisher: Grosset & Dunlap
- Publication date: 1937, 1972
- Publication place: United States
- Media type: Print (hardback & paperback)
- Pages: 220, 180
- Preceded by: The Whispering Statue
- Followed by: The Clue of the Tapping Heels

The Haunted Bridge is the fifteenth volume in the Nancy Drew Mystery Stories series. It was originally published by Grosset & Dunlap in 1937. It was written by Mildred A. Wirt Benson. Its text was revised and published in 1972 by Priscilla Baker-Carr.
