= The Riding Club Crime =

Book by Carolyn Keene

- Author: Carolyn Keene
- Language: English
- Series: Nancy Drew Mystery Stories
- Genre: Juvenile literature
- Publication date: 2003
- Publication place: United States
- Preceded by: Intrigue at the Grand Opera
- Followed by: Danger on the Great Lakes

The Riding Club Crime is the 172nd volume in the Nancy Drew Mystery Stories series of books. It was released in 2003.

== Plot summary ==
Nancy, George and Elsa are enjoying a horse ride, when Nancy's horse falls into a hole while attempting a four-foot jump over a post-and-rail.

Elsa is a counselor at Green Spring Pony Club summer camp, which has been vandalised by unknown persons. The owner, Mrs Rogers, is getting worried. Nancy, disguised as a counselor, tries to figure out who the culprit is. As more incidents happen, the more Nancy realizes she has to work quickly. Will Nancy and her friends be able to keep the Green Spring Farm going?
