= The Hidden Window Mystery =

1956 novel by Carolyn Keene

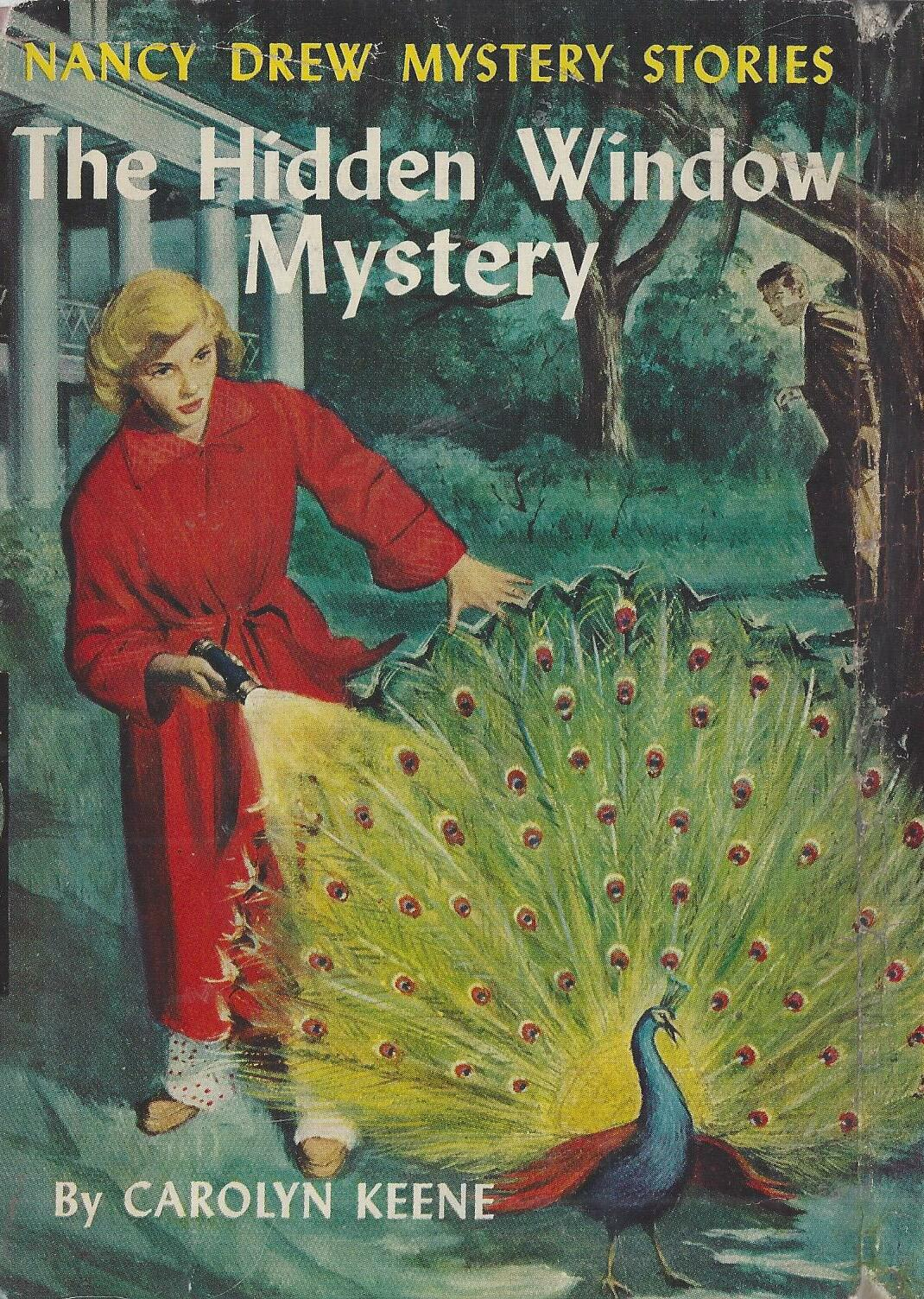
- 1st Edition Cover
- Author: Carolyn Keene
- Language: English
- Series: Nancy Drew Mystery Stories
- Genre: Juvenile literature
- Publisher: Grosset & Dunlap
- Publication date: 1956
- Publication place: United States
- Media type: Print (hardback & paperback)
- Preceded by: The Witch Tree Symbol
- Followed by: The Haunted Showboat

The Hidden Window Mystery is the thirty-fourth volume in the Nancy Drew Mystery Stories series. It was first published in 1956 under the pseudonym Carolyn Keene. The actual author was ghostwriter Harriet Stratemeyer Adams.

== Plot ==
Nancy and her friends, Bess and George travel to Charlottesville, Virginia, in search for a missing stained-glass window. They also visit Richmond, Virginia, and the church where Patrick Henry gave his "Give me liberty or give me death" speech. The girls stay with Nancy's cousin Susan. Nancy discovers someone is trying to keep her away from Charlottesville. The mansion they are staying at is said to be haunted by a mysterious ghost. Also Nancy's new neighbor's brother, Alonzo Rugby, is in Charlottesville and is a major suspect in this mystery.

== Publication ==
The novel was published in 1956 by Grosset & Dunlap. It was the 34th Nancy Drew novel.

== Reception ==
It was ranked 18th of the 56 classic volumes in the Nancy Drew Mystery Stories series by The Week.
