= The Double Jinx Mystery =

Book by Carolyn Keene

- Author: Carolyn Keene
- Language: English
- Series: Nancy Drew Mystery Stories
- Genre: Juvenile literature
- Publisher: Grosset & Dunlap
- Publication date: 1973
- Pages: 180
- ISBN: 0-448-09550-5
- OCLC: 707071
- LC Class: PZ7.K23 Nan no. 50
- Preceded by: The Secret of Mirror Bay
- Followed by: Mystery of the Glowing Eye

The Double Jinx Mystery is the fiftieth volume in the Nancy Drew Mystery Stories series. It was first published in 1973 under the pseudonym Carolyn Keene. The actual author was ghostwriter Harriet Stratemeyer Adams.

== Plot summary ==
This volume details the story of a family zoo and aviary, believed to have been jinxed by people out to take their land for high rise development. Nancy Drew and her friends must get to the bottom of the mystery, before they are jinxed themselves.
