= The Mysterious Mannequin =

Book by Carolyn Keene

- Author: Carolyn Keene
- Language: English
- Series: Nancy Drew Mystery Stories
- Genre: Juvenile literature
- Publisher: Grosset & Dunlap
- Publication date: 1970
- Publication place: United States
- ISBN: 0-448-09547-5
- OCLC: 82202
- Preceded by: The Invisible Intruder
- Followed by: The Crooked Banister

The Mysterious Mannequin is the forty-seventh volume in the Nancy Drew Mystery Stories series. It was first published in 1970 under the pseudonym Carolyn Keene. The actual author was a ghostwriter following a plot outlined by Harriet Stratemeyer Adams, heir to the Stratemeyer Syndicate.
