= The Clue in the Old Stagecoach =

Book by Harriet Adams under the pseudonym Carolyn Keene

- First edition
- Author: Carolyn Keene
- Language: English
- Series: Nancy Drew Mystery Stories
- Genre: Juvenile literature
- Publisher: Grosset & Dunlap
- Publication date: 1960
- Publication place: United States
- Media type: Print (hardback & paperback)
- Preceded by: The Secret of the Golden Pavilion
- Followed by: The Mystery of the Fire Dragon

The Clue in the Old Stagecoach is the thirty-seventh volume in the Nancy Drew Mystery Stories series. It was first published in 1960 under the pseudonym Carolyn Keene. The actual author was ghostwriter Harriet Stratemeyer Adams.

== Plot summary ==
Nancy searches for an antique stagecoach that, according to legend, contains something of great value to the people of Francisville.
