= The Strange Message in the Parchment =

Book by Harriet Adams under the pseudonym Carolyn Keene

- Author: Carolyn Keene
- Language: English
- Series: Nancy Drew Mystery Stories
- Genre: Juvenile literature
- Publisher: Grosset & Dunlap
- Publication date: 1977
- Publication place: United States
- Media type: Print (hardback & paperback)
- Pages: 180
- ISBN: 0-448-09554-8
- OCLC: 2746092
- LC Class: PZ7 .K23 Nan no. 54
- Preceded by: The Sky Phantom
- Followed by: Mystery of Crocodile Island

The Strange Message in the Parchment is the fifty-fourth volume in the Nancy Drew Mystery Stories series. It was first published in 1977 under the pseudonym Carolyn Keene. The actual author was ghostwriter Harriet Stratemeyer Adams.
