= The Crooked Banister =

Book by Carolyn Keene

- Author: Carolyn Keene
- Language: English
- Series: Nancy Drew Mystery Stories
- Genre: Juvenile literature
- Publisher: Grosset & Dunlap
- Publication date: 1971
- Publication place: United States
- Media type: Print (paperback)
- ISBN: 0-448-09548-3
- OCLC: 121411
- LC Class: PZ7.K23 Cr
- Preceded by: The Mysterious Mannequin
- Followed by: The Secret of Mirror Bay

The Crooked Banister is the forty-eighth volume in the Nancy Drew Mystery Stories series. It was first published in 1971 under the pseudonym Carolyn Keene. The actual author was ghostwriter Harriet Stratemeyer Adams.
