= The Wedding Day Mystery =

1997 novel by Carolyn Keene

The Wedding Day Mystery is the 136th novel of the Nancy Drew Mystery Stories series. It was first published by Simon & Schuster in 1997 under the pseudonym Carolyn Keene.

== Plot summary ==
The plot revolves around the happenings taking place at Heights House, a Victorian mansion on the outskirts of Nancy Drew's home town, River Heights. It has been hired by Happily Ever After, Inc., a wedding consulting service at which Nancy's friend Bess Marvin works.

Bess's cousin George and Nancy have agreed to assist Bess in the four weddings that are taking place on that weekend. But then a series of mishaps follow. One of the brides is frightened when she sees a ghost – or rather, someone dressed as a ghost – in her closet. Nancy's car is also tampered with, which nearly kills her. The bride's wedding gifts are stolen, and the wedding dress of the bride of the next wedding is slashed to rags.

== Ending ==
In the end, the saboteur turns out to be Grace Sayer, the previous owner of the house. She had lost the house due to debts and intended to regain it by frightening all its inhabitants. But after she is caught during the third wedding, the problems do not end. A message is sent to the fourth bride warning her to stop the marriage before it is too late. Nancy discovers that Rafe, the security guard, is an ex-boyfriend of the fourth bride and is the one who sent the letter. Nancy and her friends prevent him from stopping the marriage.

== Tagline ==
"When crime crashes the party, It's time for Nancy to get cracking!"
