= The Mystery of the Fire Dragon =

Nancy Drew 38, published 1961

- Author: Carolyn Keene
- Language: English
- Series: Nancy Drew Mystery Stories
- Genre: Juvenile literature
- Publisher: Grosset & Dunlap
- Publication date: 1961
- Publication place: United States
- Media type: Print (hardback & paperback)
- Preceded by: The Clue in the Old Stagecoach
- Followed by: The Clue of the Dancing Puppet

The Mystery of the Fire Dragon is the thirty-eighth volume in the Nancy Drew Mystery Stories series. It was written under the pseudonym Carolyn Keene, and was first published in 1961.

== Plot summary ==
Nancy Drew is called to New York City by her Aunt Eloise to solve a missing-person case. The granddaughter of her elderly Chinese author neighbor, Mr. Soong, has been kidnapped. The search is on, first by disguising Nancy's friend George Fayne as the missing Chi Che, and then pursuing a lead at Chi Che's place of employment, a book store, where Nancy encounters its suspicious owner, Mr Stromberg.

Nancy decides to visit the store again but as she goes along the sidewalk, Nancy is knocked-out by a falling vase which hits her on the head. While Nancy is unconscious, Bess and George take up the mystery and a red-haired man is quickly arrested.

A series of clues leads the girls to Hong Kong, where Nancy's boyfriend, Ned Nickerson, joins the action. Nancy foolishly follows "Chi Che" on board a plane, and is herself kidnapped. Her captor grabs her as soon as she enters the plane. Nancy's frantic screams are drowned out by the plane engine as it revs and then takes off. Helpless in her captor's grip, Nancy is bound and gagged and left on alone on a couch. Ingenious Nancy uses her lipstick to signal an SOS on the plane windows. After her rescue, she follows more clues to an international smuggling ring, and, utilizing a disguised George once again, forces the thieves out of hiding and has the chance to finally locate the missing girl.

Nancy is once again kidnapped by some of the criminals just as she and her friends are about to solve the mystery. While staking out a park, Nancy is suddenly grabbed from behind and dragged away. She tries to scream, but the man covers her mouth with his hand. She is carried to a nearby car, and then bound and gagged. Then her captor then drives her to a ship, where she is made a prisoner with Chi Che. The two of them manage to escape together, and the mystery is solved.

== Production ==
This is the highest number volume in the series to be issued with a dust jacket. The publishers commissioned new artwork for volume 12, The Message in the Hollow Oak, although the book text had not been updated and revised, and The Mystery at Lilac Inn, which had been revised with a totally different story, now twenty chapters in length, and with a copyright of 1961. Subsequent volumes that were either updated or issued as new books integrated the artwork directly into the covers.
