= The Secret of the Forgotten City =

Book by Harriet Adams under the pseudonym Carolyn Keene

- Author: Carolyn Keene
- Language: English
- Series: Nancy Drew Mystery Stories
- Genre: Juvenile literature
- Publisher: Grosset & Dunlap
- Publication date: 1975
- Publication place: United States
- Media type: Print (hardback & paperback)
- Pages: 180
- ISBN: 0-448-09552-1
- OCLC: 1531525
- LC Class: PZ7.K23 Nan no. 52
- Preceded by: Mystery of the Glowing Eye
- Followed by: The Sky Phantom

The Secret of the Forgotten City is the fifty-second volume in the Nancy Drew Mystery Stories series. It was first published in 1975 under the pseudonym Carolyn Keene. The actual author was ghostwriter Harriet Stratemeyer Adams.
