= George Edward Stanley =

American writer of children's fiction and academic

- Born: July 15, 1942; Memphis, Texas, United States
- Died: February 7, 2011 (aged 68); Oklahoma City, Oklahoma, United States
- Occupation: Author
- Writing career
- Genre: Children's books

George Edward Stanley (July 15, 1942 – February 7, 2011) was a teacher at Cameron University and author of short stories for middle grade kids under the pseudonym M. T. Coffin.

== Biography ==
George Edward Stanley was born in Memphis, Texas, in 1942 and died on February 7, 2011, from an aneurysm at the age of 68 years.

From 1967 to 1969, he taught English to foreigners of East Texas State University; the following year he held the same role at the University of Kansas (Lawrence, Kansas). In 1970 he moved to Cameron University (always in Lawton), where he worked until 1973 as an assistant professor, associate professor from 1973 to 1976, later becoming a professor of Middle Eastern and African languages in 1979.

In 1979 he published his first book Mini-Mysteries began to write children's books, career that led him to write 102 novels (including also one republished in Italian).

== Awards and honors ==
- Distinguished Faculty Award, Phi Kappa Phi, 1974.
- Member of the Year Award, Society of Children's Book Writers, 1979.
- Oklahoma Writers Hall of Fame, 1994.

== Works ==
=== Children's stories ===
- Mini-Mysteries, Saturday Evening Post Co. (Indianapolis, IN), 1979.
- The Crime Lab, illustrated by Andrew Glass, Avon (New York, NY), 1980.
- The Case of the Clever Marathon Cheat, Meadowbrook (Minnetonka, MN), 1985.
- The Ukrainian Egg Mystery, Avon (New York, NY), 1986.
- The Codebreaker Kids!, Avon (New York, NY), 1987.
- The Italian Spaghetti Mystery, Avon (New York, NY), 1987.
- (Aka Laura Lee Hope) The New Bobbsey Twins: The Case of the Runaway Money, Simon & Schuster (New York, NY), 1987.
- The Mexican Tamale Mystery, Avon (New York, NY), 1988.
- (Aka Laura Lee Hope) The Bobbsey Twins: The Mystery on the Mississippi, Simon & Schuster (New York, NY), 1988.
- The Codebreaker Kids Return, Avon (New York, NY), 1989.
- Hershell Cobwell and the Miraculous Tattoo, Avon (New York, NY), 1991.
- Rats in the Attic: And Other Stories to Make Your Skin Crawl, Avon (New York, NY), 1994.
- Happy Deathday to You: And Other Stories to Give You Nightmares, Avon (New York, NY), 1995.
- Snake Camp (series "Road to Reading"), Golden Books (New York, NY), 2000.
- Ghost Horse (series "Road to Reading"), Golden Books (New York, NY), 2000.

==== As Carolyn Keene (for Nancy Drew) ====
- The Mystery in Tornado Alley (series "Nancy Drew Mystery Stories"), Simon & Schuster (New York, NY), 2000.
- No Strings Attached (series "Nancy Drew Mystery Stories"), Simon & Schuster (New York, NY), 2003.
- Danger on The Great Lakes (series "Nancy Drew Mystery Stories"), Simon & Schuster (New York, NY), 2003.
- Stop the Clock (series "Nancy Drew, Girl Detective"), Simon & Schuster (New York, NY), 2005.
- Framed (series "Nancy Drew, Girl Detective"), Simon & Schuster (New York, NY), 2006.

==== As Franklin W. Dixon (for Hardy Boys) ====
- The Case of the Psychic's Vision (series "Hardy Boys"), #177, Simon & Schuster (New York, NY), 2003.
- The Mystery of the Black Rhino (series "Hardy Boys"), #178, Simon & Schuster (New York, NY), 2003.
- The Secret of the Soldier's Gold (series "Hardy Boys"), #182, Simon & Schuster (New York, NY), 2003.
- Hidden Mountain (series "Hardy Boys"), #186, Simon & Schuster (New York, NY), 2004.
- One False Step (series "Hardy Boys"), #189, Simon & Schuster (New York, NY), 2005.

=== Scaredy Cats ===
- The Day the Ants Got Really Mad, Simon & Schuster (New York, NY), 1996.
- There's a Shark in the Swimming Pool!, Simon & Schuster (New York, NY), 1996.
- Mrs. O'Dell's Third-Grade Class Is Shrinking, Simon & Schuster (New York, NY), 1996.
- Bugs for Breakfast, Simon & Schuster (New York, NY), 1996.
- Who Invited Aliens to My Slumber Party?, Simon & Schuster (New York, NY), 1997.
- The New Kid in School Is a Vampire Bat, Simon & Schuster (New York, NY), 1997.
- A Werewolf Followed Me Home, Simon & Schuster (New York, NY), 1997.
- The Vampire Kittens of Count Dracula, Simon & Schuster (New York, NY), 1997.

=== Spinetinglers (under the pseudonym of MT Coffin) ===
- Billy Baker's Dog Will not Stay Buried!, Avon (New York, NY), 1995.
- Where Have All the Parents Gone?, Avon (New York, NY), 1995.
- Check It Out and Die!, Avon (New York, NY), 1995.
- Do not Go to the Principal's Office, Avon (New York, NY), 1996.
- The Dead Kid Did It!, Avon (New York, NY), 1996.
- Pet Store, Avon (New York, NY), 1996.
- Escape from the Haunted Museum, Avon (New York, NY), 1996.
- The Curse of the Cheerleaders, Avon (New York, NY), 1997.
- Circus FREAKS, Avon (New York, NY), 1997.

=== Third Grade Detectives ===
- The Clue of the Left-handed Glove, illustrated by Salvatore Murdocca, Aladdin (New York, NY), 1998, published as The Clue of the Left-handed Envelope 2000.
- The Puzzle of the Pretty Pink Handkerchief, illustrated by Salvatore Murdocca, Aladdin (New York, NY), 1998.
- The Mystery of the Hairy Tomatoes, illustrated by Salvatore Murdocca, Aladdin (New York, NY), 2001.
- The Cobweb Confession, illustrated by Salvatore Murdocca, Aladdin (New York, NY), 2001.
- The Secret of the Green Skin, illustrations by Salvatore Murdocca, Aladdin (New York, NY), 2003.
- The Case of the Dirty Clue, Aladdin (New York, NY), 2003.
- The Mystery of the Wooden Witness, Aladdin (New York, NY), 2004.
- The Case of the Sweaty Bank Robber, Aladdin (New York, NY), 2004.
- The Mystery of the Stolen Statue, Aladdin (New York, NY), 2004.

=== Katie Lynn Cookie Company ===
- The Secret Ingredient, illustrated by Linda Graves Dockey, Random House (New York, NY), 1999.
- Frogs' Legs for Dinner, illustrated by Linda Graves Dockey, Random House (New York, NY), 2000.
- The Battle of the Bakers, illustrated by Linda Graves Dockey, Random House (New York, NY), 2000.
- Bottled Up!, Illustrated by Linda Graves Dockey, Random House (New York, NY), 2001.
- Wedding Cookies, illustrated by Linda Graves Dockey, Random House (New York, NY), 2001.

=== Adam Sharp ===
- Adam Sharp, the Spy Who Barked, illustrated by Guy Francis, Golden Books (New York, NY), 2002, published as The Spy Who Barked , Random House (New York, NY), 2003.
- Adam Sharp, London Calling, illustrated by Guy Francis, Golden Books (New York, NY), 2002, published as London Calling , Random House (New York, NY), 2003.
- Swimming with Sharks, illustrated by Guy Francis, Random House (New York, NY), 2003.
- Operation Spy School, illustrated by Guy Francis, Random House (New York, NY), 2003.
- The Riddle of the Stolen Sand, illustrations by Salvatore Murdocca, Aladdin (New York, NY), 2003.
- Moose Master, illustrated by Guy Francis, Random House (New York, NY), 2004.
- Code Word Kangaroo, illustrated by Guy Francis, Random House (New York, NY), 2004.

=== Twin Connection (under the pseudonym Adam Mills) ===
- Hot Pursuit, Ballantine (New York, NY), 1989.
- On the Run, Ballantine (New York, NY), 1989.
- Right on Target, Ballantine (New York, NY), 1989.
- Secret Ballot, Ballantine (New York, NY), 1989.
- Dangerous Play, Ballantine (New York, NY), 1989.
- Skyjack!, Ballantine (New York, NY), 1989.
- High-Tech Heist, Ballantine (New York, NY), 1989.
- Cold Chills, Ballantine (New York, NY), 1989.

=== Nonfiction and poetry for children ===
- Wild Horses, illustrations by Michael Langham Rowe, Random House (New York, NY), 2001.
- Geronimo: Young Warrior, illustrations by Meryl Henderson, Aladdin (New York, NY), 2001.
- Andrew Jackson, Young Patriot, Aladdin (New York, NY), 2003.
- Mr. Rogers: Young Friend and Neighbor, Aladdin (New York, NY), 2004.
- Harry S Truman, Aladdin (New York, NY), 2004.
- A Primary Source History of the United States, in eight volumes, Gareth-Stevens (Milwaukee, WI), 2005.

=== Compositions for the radio ===
- The Reclassified Child, British Broadcasting Corporation (London, England), 1974.
- Another Football Season, British Broadcasting Corporation (London, England), 1974.
- Better Inglese, British Broadcasting Corporation (London, England), 1975.

=== Other works ===
- "Writing Short Stories for Young People", Writer's Digest (Cincinnati, OH), 1987.
- He has also collaborated in the writing of tales of espionage under the pseudonym of Stuart Symons
