= The Thirteenth Pearl =

Book by Harriet Adams under the pseudonym Carolyn Keene

- Author: Carolyn Keene
- Language: English
- Series: Nancy Drew Mystery Stories
- Genre: Juvenile literature
- Publisher: Grosset & Dunlap
- Publication date: February 28, 1979
- Publication place: United States
- Media type: Print (hardback & paperback)
- ISBN: 0-448-09556-4
- OCLC: 19116983
- Preceded by: Mystery of Crocodile Island
- Followed by: The Triple Hoax

The Thirteenth Pearl is the fifty-sixth volume in the Nancy Drew Mystery Stories series. It was first published in 1979 under the pseudonym Carolyn Keene. The actual author was ghostwriter Harriet Stratemeyer Adams. The Thirteenth Pearl is the end of the original 56-book series published by Grosset & Dunlap. Subsequent volumes were published by Simon & Schuster.

== Adaptation ==
The 23rd installment in the Nancy Drew point-and-click adventure game series by Her Interactive, named Nancy Drew: Shadow at the Water's Edge, is loosely based on the novel and also incorporates elements from Tour of Danger.
