= The Secret of the Wooden Lady =

Nancy Drew 27, published 1950

The Secret of the Wooden lady
- Author: Carolyn Keene
- Language: English
- Series: Nancy Drew Mystery Stories
- Genre: Juvenile literature
- Publisher: Grosset & Dunlap
- Publication date: 1950
- Publication place: United States
- Media type: Print (hardback & paperback)
- Preceded by: The Clue of the Leaning Chimney
- Followed by: The Clue of the Black Keys

The Secret of the Wooden Lady is the twenty-seventh volume in the Nancy Drew Mystery Stories series. It was first published in 1950 under the pseudonym Carolyn Keene. The actual author was ghostwriter Margaret Scherf.
