= The Clue of the Dancing Puppet =

Book by Harriet Adams under the pseudonym Carolyn Keene

- Author: Carolyn Keene
- Language: English
- Series: Nancy Drew Mystery Stories
- Genre: Juvenile literature
- Publisher: Grosset & Dunlap
- Publication date: 1962
- Publication place: United States
- Media type: Print (hardback & paperback)
- Preceded by: The Mystery of the Fire Dragon
- Followed by: The Moonstone Castle Mystery

The Clue of the Dancing Puppet is the thirty-ninth volume in the Nancy Drew Mystery Stories series. It was first published in 1962 under the pseudonym Carolyn Keene. The actual author was ghostwriter Harriet Stratemeyer Adams.
