= The Secret of Mirror Bay =

Book by Carolyn Keene

- Author: Carolyn Keene
- Language: English
- Series: Nancy Drew Mystery Stories
- Genre: Juvenile literature
- Publisher: Grosset & Dunlap
- Publication date: 1972
- Publication place: United States
- Media type: Print (hardback & paperback)
- ISBN: 0-448-09549-1
- OCLC: 320575
- LC Class: PZ7.K23 Nan no. 49
- Preceded by: The Crooked Banister
- Followed by: The Double Jinx Mystery

The Secret of Mirror Bay is the forty-ninth volume in the Nancy Drew Mystery Stories series, published in 1972 under the pseudonym Carolyn Keene.

== Plot summary ==
Aunt Eloise invites Nancy and her friends to a cabin at Mirror Bay, in Cooperstown, New York, to solve a case of a mysterious woman seen gliding across the water. Nancy is then involved in a vacation hoax because she resembles a woman involved in the hoax. A strange green sorcerer who appears in the woods and a lost treasure involving the gliding woman lead Nancy and her friends to uncover a concealed operation in the woods.
