= The Clue in the Crossword Cipher =

Book by Harriet Adams under the pseudonym Carolyn Keene

- Author: Carolyn Keene
- Language: English
- Series: Nancy Drew Mystery Stories
- Genre: Juvenile literature
- Published: 1967 Grosset & Dunlap
- Publication place: United States
- Media type: Print (hardback & paperback)
- ISBN: 0-448-09544-0
- OCLC: 27866939
- Preceded by: The Mystery of the 99 Steps
- Followed by: The Spider Sapphire Mystery

The Clue in the Crossword Cipher is the forty-fourth volume in the Nancy Drew Mystery Stories series. It was first published in 1967 under the pseudonym Carolyn Keene. The actual author was ghostwriter Harriet Stratemeyer Adams.

== Plot ==
A woman named Carla Ponce invites Nancy, Bess, and George to Peru to help decipher the mystery in the crossword cipher—a wooden plaque that promises to lead them to a wonderful treasure. Nancy must find the treasure before a gang of thieves led by El Gato (The Cat) reach it first.

== See also ==
- Nazca lines
