= The Sky Phantom =

Book by Harriet Adams under the pseudonym Carolyn Keene

- Author: Carolyn Keene
- Language: English
- Series: Nancy Drew Mystery Stories
- Genre: Juvenile literature
- Publisher: Grosset & Dunlap
- Publication date: 1976
- Publication place: United States
- Media type: Print (hardback & paperback)
- ISBN: 0-448-09553-X
- OCLC: 2205026
- LC Class: PZ7.K23 Nan no. 53
- Preceded by: The Secret of the Forgotten City
- Followed by: The Strange Message in the Parchment

The Sky Phantom is the fifty-third volume in the Nancy Drew Mystery Stories series. It was first published in 1976 under the pseudonym Carolyn Keene. The actual author was ghostwriter Harriet Stratemeyer Adams.
