= The Mistletoe Mystery =

2002 novel by Carolyn Keene

Cover

The Mistletoe Mystery is the 169th volume of the Nancy Drew Mystery Stories series.

== Plot summary ==
Nancy's friend Bess has been hired by Special Effects, a River Heights company, to decorate Albemarle's department store for the holidays. When Bess discovers that her friend Ali Marie is now working at that store, she is thrilled — the two of them can have lunch and try on clothes for fun! However, when some dresses are swiped, Ali is accused of stealing and the party is over. Sure of her friend's innocence, Bess calls Nancy to help find the real thief. With all the suspects and misleading clues, Nancy and her friends are running in circles — and the holiday shopping rush isn't helping! But with all the difficulties they figure out that Bess's boss Wayne is the real thief.
