= The Haunted Showboat =

1957 novel by Carolyn Keene

- First edition
- Author: Carolyn Keene
- Series: Nancy Drew Mystery Stories
- Publisher: Grosset & Dunlap
- Publication date: 1957
- Preceded by: The Hidden Window Mystery
- Followed by: The Secret of the Golden Pavilion

The Haunted Showboat is the thirty-fifth book in the Nancy Drew mystery series. It was first published in 1957 under the pseudonym Carolyn Keene. The actual author was ghostwriter Harriet Stratemeyer Adams.

== Plot ==
Nancy, Bess, and George travel to New Orleans for Mardi Gras, but they are then enveloped into a mystery involving an old showboat that is said to be haunted. Nancy then uncovers an imposter and searches for buried pirate gold.

== See also ==
- Mardi Gras in New Orleans
