= Mystery of the Glowing Eye =

1974 novel by Carolyn Keene

- Author: Carolyn Keene
- Language: English
- Series: Nancy Drew Mystery Stories
- Genre: Juvenile literature
- Publisher: Grosset & Dunlap
- Publication date: 1974
- Publication place: United States
- Media type: Print (hardback & paperback)
- ISBN: 0-448-09551-3
- OCLC: 969445
- LC Class: PZ7.K23 Nan no. 51
- Preceded by: The Double Jinx Mystery
- Followed by: The Secret of the Forgotten City

Mystery of the Glowing Eye is the fifty-first volume in the Nancy Drew Mystery Stories series. It was first published in 1974 under the pseudonym Carolyn Keene. The actual author was ghostwriter Harriet Stratemeyer Adams.

== Plot ==
When Ned Nickerson is kidnapped, Nancy knows it has something to do with the code name "Cyclops", but she has to work out the connection with the glowing eye-shaped stone in the museum. The plot involves advanced technology for the 1970s including a robot helicopter and a paralyzing ray.

Nancy is also troubled by a young lawyer's romantic intentions toward Carson Drew.
