= No Strings Attached (novel) =

2003 Nancy Drew novel by Edward Stratemeyer

No Strings Attached is the 170th volume in the Nancy Drew Mystery Stories series.

== Plot summary ==
The sleuthing friends travel to Paris (where several previous cases have also developed). George has organized some tennis matches there, and Nancy and Bess tag along in hopes of enjoying the sightseeing. The rooming house where they stay is owned by Mimi Louseau, a 37-year-old puppeteer and museum proprietor. When they learn about a secret treasure, which will be the cause of thefts, burglaries and damage to the museum, it is up to Nancy to solve the riddle before somebody else does.
