= The Phantom of Pine Hill =

Book by Harriet Adams under the pseudonym Carolyn Keene

- Author: Carolyn Keene
- Language: English
- Series: Nancy Drew Mystery Stories
- Genre: Juvenile literature
- Publisher: Grosset & Dunlap
- Publication date: 1965
- Publication place: United States
- Media type: Print (hardback & paperback)
- Preceded by: The Clue of the Whistling Bagpipes
- Followed by: The Mystery of the 99 Steps

The Phantom of Pine Hill is the forty-second volume in the Nancy Drew Mystery Stories series. It was first published in 1965 under the pseudonym Carolyn Keene. The actual author was ghostwriter Harriet Stratemeyer Adams.
