= The Scarlet Slipper Mystery =

Book by Carolyn Keene

- Author: Carolyn Keene (Charles S. Strong)
- Language: English
- Series: Nancy Drew Mystery Stories
- Genre: Juvenile literature
- Publisher: Grosset & Dunlap
- Publication date: 1954
- Publication place: United States
- Media type: Print (hardback & paperback)
- Preceded by: The Ringmaster's Secret
- Followed by: The Witch Tree Symbol

The Scarlet Slipper Mystery is the thirty-second volume in the Nancy Drew Mystery Stories series. It was published in 1954 by Grosset & Dunlap and written by Charles S. Strong under the house pseudonym Carolyn Keene.
