= The Spider Sapphire Mystery =

Book by Harriet Adams under the pseudonym Carolyn Keene

- Author: Carolyn Keene
- Language: English
- Series: Nancy Drew Mystery Stories
- Genre: Juvenile literature
- Publisher: Grosset & Dunlap
- Publication date: 1968
- Publication place: United States
- Media type: Print (hardback & paperback)
- ISBN: 0-448-09545-9
- OCLC: 437426
- Preceded by: The Clue in the Crossword Cipher
- Followed by: The Invisible Intruder

The Spider Sapphire Mystery is the forty-fifth volume in the Nancy Drew Mystery Stories series. It was first published in 1968 under the pseudonym Carolyn Keene. The actual author was ghostwriter Harriet Stratemeyer Adams.

== Plot ==
A client of Carson Drew, a Mr. Floyd Ramsey, is accused of stealing the fabulous Spider Sapphire which leads Nancy and her friends to Africa. Nancy uncovers a notorious scheme and solves the mystery of a missing safari guide.
