= The Case of the Rising Stars =

1989 book by Carolyn Keene

Nancy Drew: The Case of the Rising Stars
- First edition
- Author: Carolyn Keene
- Language: English
- Series: Nancy Drew stories
- Genre: Detective, mystery
- Publisher: Minstrel
- Publication date: 1989
- Publication place: United States
- ISBN: 0-671-66312-7
- OCLC: 19400874
- LC Class: CPB Box no. 1783 vol. 21
- Preceded by: The Mystery of Misty Canyon
- Followed by: The Search for Cindy Austin

The Case of the Rising Stars is the eighty-seventh volume in the Nancy Drew mystery series. It was first published in 1989 under the pseudonym Carolyn Keene.

== Plot ==
Nancy, Bess and George arrive in Chicago for the Mystery Lovers of America convention. The two stars scheduled to appear are kidnapped, and some think it is a ratings ploy, but Nancy uncovers the truth and only she can save them.
