= The Kachina Doll Mystery =

Nancy Drew 62, published 1981

- First edition
- Author: Carolyn Keene
- Cover artist: Ruth Sanderson
- Language: English
- Series: Nancy Drew stories
- Genre: Detective, mystery novel
- Publisher: Wanderer Books
- Publication date: 1981
- Publication place: United States
- Pages: 192 pp
- ISBN: 0-207-14698-5
- OCLC: 12479354
- Preceded by: The Swami's Ring
- Followed by: The Twin Dilemma

The Kachina Doll Mystery is the sixty-second volume in the Nancy Drew Mystery Stories series. It was first published in 1981 under the pseudonym Carolyn Keene.
