= The Triple Hoax =

57th book in the Nancy Drew Mystery Series

Nancy Drew: The Triple Hoax
- Author: Carolyn Keene
- Cover artist: Ruth Sanderson
- Language: English
- Series: 57
- Published: November 21, 1979
- Publisher: Wanderer Books
- Pages: 184
- ISBN: 978-0-448-43688-3
- OCLC: 60345657
- Preceded by: The Thirteenth Pearl
- Followed by: The Flying Saucer Mystery

The Triple Hoax is the 57th book in the Nancy Drew Mystery Stories. It was the first paperback Nancy Drew produced by Simon & Schuster under the Wanderer imprint in 1979, and was ghostwritten by Harriet Stratemeyer. It was later republished again in both Wanderer and Minstrel imprints, each time with a new cover. In 2005, Grosset & Dunlap reprinted it in the yellow hardback "glossy flashlight" format. The original edition contained six internal illustrations by Ruth Sanderson. These illustrations were removed in the two subsequent printings, but kept in the glossy printing.

== Plot summary ==
In The Triple Hoax, Nancy, her Aunt Eloise, Bess, and George begin by going to New York to help a friend. There they see a performance by the Hoaxters, a group of magicians. These magicians take handbags and wallets from people in the audience – they do return them, but Nancy feels suspicious.

Nancy and her friends follow leads to Mexico City, where Nancy is asked to find a child that has gone missing, and then to Los Angeles, where Nancy and her friends are threatened by the Hoaxters to try to scare them off the case.

== Book covers ==
The Triple Hoax features different versions of the cover art including the following three:

The first cover was by Ruth Sanderson in 1979, and features model Lisa (Kauffman) Tharp. The next cover was by Garin Baker in 1986, and the last was by Linda Thomas in 1989. The Sanderson art was used for the first eight Wanderer printings and the Scholastic printing, the Baker art was used for the ninth Wanderer printing, and the Thomas art was used for two Minstrel printings.
