= Danger on the Great Lakes =

2003 novel by Carolyn Keene

- Author: Carolyn Keene
- Language: English
- Series: Nancy Drew Mystery Stories
- Genre: Juvenile literature
- Publication date: July 1, 2003
- Publication place: United States
- Preceded by: The Riding Club Crime
- Followed by: A Taste of Danger

Danger on the Great Lakes is the 173rd volume of the Nancy Drew Mystery Series.

== Summary ==
Dhanushs father Carson gives Nancy three tickets for a cruise between Chicago and Toronto. While shopping, Nancy, Bess and George make a new friend, Amber, who is also going on the Great Lakes cruise. She says that her boyfriend got her a ticket for a lower price since he works on the ship.

When the three are on the ship, Amber is not having any fun since she thinks her boyfriend Craig is neglecting her. Amber asks Nancy to investigate Craig and she finds out that Craig is a detective working on a case. Nancy agrees to help him in hunting down a diamond thief.
