= The E-mail Mystery =

1998 novel by Carolyn Keene

- Author: Carolyn Keene
- Language: English
- Series: Nancy Drew stories
- Genre: Detective, mystery novel
- Publisher: Aladdin Paperbacks; Simon & Schuster
- Publication date: 1998
- Publication place: United States
- Media type: Print (hardback & paperback)
- ISBN: 978-0-671-00121-6
- Preceded by: Mystery on Maui
- Followed by: The Missing Horse Mystery

The E-mail Mystery is the 144th book in the Nancy Drew series. It was published in 1998 under the pseudonym Carolyn Keene.

== Plot ==
When someone starts making email maneuvers to take destabilize the law firm of her father Carson, Nancy investigates the web to find the perpetrator.

== Tagline ==
"Nancy uncovers intrigue on the Internet... and the password is danger!"
