= The Case of the Dangerous Solution =

Book by Carolyn Keene

- An image of the cover of Nancy Drew: The Case of the Dangerous Solution
- Author: Carolyn Keene
- Cover artist: Aleta Jenks
- Language: English
- Series: Nancy Drew stories
- Genre: Detective, mystery novel
- Publisher: Aladdin Paperbacks
- Publication date: 1995
- Publication place: United States
- Pages: 160 pp
- ISBN: 9780606085755
- OCLC: 33126477
- Preceded by: The Riddle in the Rare Book
- Followed by: The Treasure in the Royal Tower

The Case of the Dangerous Solution is a middle grade novel by Carolyn Keene in the Nancy Drew stories. It is the 127th novel in the series.

== Plot summary ==
Nancy's friend George delivers medicines from a local pharmacy — and her customers begin to fall ill. Nancy is convinced that foul play is involved. Someone is sabotaging the medication. As Nancy begins to investigate, she finds her own prescription full of danger.
