= The Broken Anchor =

Book by Carolyn Keene

- First edition
- Author: Carolyn Keene
- Language: English
- Series: Nancy Drew stories
- Genre: Detective, mystery
- Publisher: Simon & Schuster
- Publication place: United States
- Media type: Print (hardback & paperback)
- Pages: 189
- ISBN: 0671464620
- Preceded by: Clue in the Ancient Disguise
- Followed by: The Silver Cobweb

The Broken Anchor is the 70th book in the Nancy Drew Stories series. It was originally published in 1983 under the Wanderer imprint of Simon and Schuster.

== Plot summary ==
Nancy receives a mysterious letter claiming she has won a week-long holiday for two at the Sweet Springs Resort on Anchor Island in the Bahamas. Nancy is puzzled because she never entered any contest. The enclosed plane tickets are for the next day, so she sends her friends Bess and George to go to the resort, and she and her dad will follow later. After Bess and George have left for Anchor Island, she and her dad, Carson Drew, go down to Miami to investigate a mysterious ship. It has been linked to them as it contains newspaper clippings on some of Nancy's recent adventures. The boat is owned by Jeff and Lena DeFoe, who Nancy finds out are the owners of the Sweet Springs resort. While searching the boat for any evidence, Nancy loses her earring and while trying to find it uncovers an old medallion. Her father takes it to Avery Yates, an antique jewelry restorer. Meanwhile, Nancy is worried because her attempts to contact Bess and George have failed.

== Characters ==
INA version:

- Nancy Drew
- Carson Drew: Nancy's father
- Hannah Gruen: Nancy's family housekeeper
- Bess Marvin: Nancy's best friend
- George Fayne: Nancy's best friend, Bess's first cousin
- Jeff DeFoe: Sweet Spring Resorts owner
- Lena DeFoe: Jeff DeFoe's wife
- Penny DeFoe: the DeFoes' grandniece
- Sheriff Boyd: Pal Cove sheriff in charge of the investigation of the mysterious boat
- Avery Yates: Carson Drew's friend and a restorer of old jewelry
- Tom: villain
- Jack: villain
- Perkins: plane passenger
- Ben Graves: plane passenger

== Artwork ==
The first edition featured cover art by Ruth Sanderson and six internal illustrations by Paul Frame. It was republished again under both Wanderer and Minstrel imprints. The illustrations were removed in the final two printings.
