= The Treasure in the Royal Tower (novel) =

Book by Carolyn Keene

- Author: Carolyn Keene
- Cover artist: Aleta Jenks
- Language: English
- Series: Nancy Drew stories
- Genre: Detective, mystery novel
- Publisher: Aladdin Paperbacks (an imprint of Simon & Schuster, Inc.)
- Publication date: December 1995
- Publication place: United States
- Pages: 150 pp
- ISBN: 0-671-50502-5
- OCLC: 33807952
- Preceded by: The Case of the Dangerous Solution
- Followed by: The Baby-sitter Burglaries

Treasure in the Royal Tower is a middle grade novel by Carolyn Keene in the Nancy Drew stories. It is the 128th novel in the series.

== Plot summary ==
Nancy takes a vacation to the Butter Ridge ski resort in Wisconsin, where the main lodge is a French castle rebuilt from the ground up. The lodge's library is vandalized. Nancy, along with her friends George Fayne and Bess Marvin, must survive an unknown assailant while discovering the secret passageways inside of an old castle.

== Adaptation ==
The fourth installment in the Nancy Drew point-and-click adventure game series by Her Interactive, named Nancy Drew: Treasure in the Royal Tower, is loosely based on the novel.
