= Russell H. Tandy =

American illustrator

Russell Haviland Tandy (1891 – December 26, 1962) was an American illustrator, best known for his cover art for early editions of the Nancy Drew and Hardy Boys series.

== Life and career ==
Tandy was a friend of Edward Stratemeyer, whose Stratemeyer Syndicate created several series of books for young readers. When Stratemeyer approached Grosset & Dunlap with his concept for Nancy Drew in 1930, he submitted dust jacket art by both Tandy and Ernest Townsend for the publishing house's consideration. They selected Tandy, who from 1930 until 1949 illustrated the first twenty-six books in the series (except the eleventh title), contributing both cover and internal artwork. Tandy was responsible for illustrating several Hardy Boys titles and two volumes in the Beverly Gray series, as well as other series featuring characters written for young readers.

In addition to his work for children's literature, Tandy worked for department stores as a fashion illustrator. He and his wife resided in Westfield, New Jersey, where they had children including Russell Tandy Jr.. He married his second wife Irene and moved to Sarasota, Florida in retirement.
