= List of Nancy Drew video games =

This is a list of video games that center upon the fictional character of Nancy Drew. Some of the games are adaptations of various Nancy Drew books, while others are not.

The games for computer and mobile, some of which were ported to game consoles, have been developed and published by HeR Interactive. Original console games have been published by Majesco and THQ.

== Computer games ==
All Nancy Drew computer games to date have been developed by HeR Interactive, which currently publishes them. Between 2000 and 2001, they were published by DreamCatcher Interactive.

=== Nancy Drew series ===
No.	Title	Release date	Based on
1	Secrets Can Kill	November 5, 1998 (Windows): Discontinued July 31, 2010	Nancy Drew Files #1: Secrets Can Kill
1	Secrets Can Kill Remastered	August 24, 2010 (Windows, Mac)	Nancy Drew Files #1: Secrets Can Kill
2	Stay Tuned for Danger	November 13, 1999 (Windows): Discontinued November 17, 2011; Re-released August 10, 2016	Nancy Drew Files #17: Stay Tuned for Danger
3	Message in a Haunted Mansion	November 24, 2000 (Windows)	Nancy Drew #122: The Message in the Haunted Mansion
3	Message in a Haunted Mansion	November 15, 2001 (GBA)	Nancy Drew #122: The Message in the Haunted Mansion
4	Treasure in the Royal Tower	August 1, 2001 (Windows)	Nancy Drew #128: The Treasure in the Royal Tower
5	The Final Scene	November 1, 2001 (Windows)	Nancy Drew Files #38: The Final Scene
6	Secret of the Scarlet Hand	August 12, 2002 (Windows)	Nancy Drew #124: The Secret of the Scarlet Hand
7	Ghost Dogs of Moon Lake	November 1, 2002 (Windows)	Nancy Drew Ghost Stories: "Ghost Dogs of Whispering Oaks"; Nancy Drew #167: Mystery by Moonlight
8	The Haunted Carousel	August 22, 2003 (Windows)	Nancy Drew #72: The Haunted Carousel
9	Danger on Deception Island	October 3, 2003 (Windows)	Nancy Drew #153: Whispers in the Fog
10	The Secret of Shadow Ranch	August 30, 2004 (Windows)	Nancy Drew #5: The Secret of Shadow Ranch
11	Curse of Blackmoor Manor	October 5, 2004 (Windows)	Nancy Drew #77: The Bluebeard Room
11	Curse of Blackmoor Manor	June 25, 2007 (DVD game)	Nancy Drew #77: The Bluebeard Room
12	Secret of the Old Clock	July 12, 2005 (Windows)	Nancy Drew #1: The Secret of the Old Clock; Nancy Drew #2: The Hidden Staircase; Nancy Drew #3: The Bungalow Mystery; Nancy Drew #4: The Mystery at Lilac Inn
13	Last Train to Blue Moon Canyon	September 15, 2005 (Windows)	Nancy Drew and Hardy Boys SuperMystery #8: Mystery Train
14	Danger by Design	July 24, 2006 (Windows)	Nancy Drew Files #30: Death by Design
15	The Creature of Kapu Cave	October 1, 2006 (Windows)	Nancy Drew #143: Mystery on Maui
16	The White Wolf of Icicle Creek	June 7, 2007 (Windows)	Nancy Drew #164: The Mystery of the Mother Wolf
16	The White Wolf of Icicle Creek	December 2, 2008 (Wii)	Nancy Drew #164: The Mystery of the Mother Wolf
17	Legend of the Crystal Skull	October 8, 2007 (Windows)	Nancy Drew #81: The Mardi Gras Mystery
18	The Phantom of Venice	July 11, 2008 (Windows)	Nancy Drew #78: The Phantom of Venice
19	The Haunting of Castle Malloy	October 16, 2008 (Windows)	Nancy Drew #168: The Bike Tour Mystery
20	Ransom of the Seven Ships	July 14, 2009 (Windows): Discontinued July 24, 2020	Nancy Drew #70: The Broken Anchor
21	Warnings at Waverly Academy	October 13, 2009 (Windows)	Nancy Drew #158: The Curse of the Black Cat
22	Trail of the Twister	June 29, 2010 (Windows, Mac)	Nancy Drew #155: The Mystery in Tornado Alley
23	Shadow at the Water's Edge	October 19, 2010 (Windows, Mac)	Nancy Drew and Hardy Boys SuperMystery #13: Tour of Danger; Nancy Drew #56: The Thirteenth Pearl
24	The Captive Curse	June 28, 2011 (Windows, Mac)	Nancy Drew #64: Captive Witness
25	Alibi in Ashes	October 18, 2011 (Windows, Mac)	Nancy Drew Files #43: False Impressions; Nancy Drew #163: The Clues Challenge
26	Tomb of the Lost Queen	May 8, 2012 (Windows, Mac)	Nancy Drew and Hardy Boys SuperMystery #25: Secrets of the Nile
27	The Deadly Device	October 23, 2012 (Windows, Mac)	Nancy Drew #165: The Crime Lab Case; Nancy Drew on Campus #22: In and Out of Love
28	Ghost of Thornton Hall	May 14, 2013 (Windows, Mac)	Nancy Drew: Girl Detective #10: Uncivil Acts
28	Ghost of Thornton Hall	March 4, 2014 (iOS)	Nancy Drew: Girl Detective #10: Uncivil Acts
28	Ghost of Thornton Hall	April 11, 2014 (Amazon Fire)	Nancy Drew: Girl Detective #10: Uncivil Acts
28	Ghost of Thornton Hall	May 6, 2014 (Android)	Nancy Drew: Girl Detective #10: Uncivil Acts
29	The Silent Spy	October 22, 2013 (Windows, Mac)	Nancy Drew #41: The Clue of the Whistling Bagpipes
30	The Shattered Medallion	May 20, 2014 (Windows, Mac)	Nancy Drew: Girl Detective Super Mystery #3: Real Fake
31	Labyrinth of Lies	October 14, 2014 (Windows, Mac)	Nancy Drew #60: The Greek Symbol Mystery
32	Sea of Darkness	May 19, 2015 (Windows, Mac)	Nancy Drew #27: The Secret of the Wooden Lady
33	Midnight in Salem	December 3, 2019 (Windows, Mac)	Nancy Drew #33: The Witch Tree Symbol and Nancy Drew #83: The Case of the Vanishing Vail
34	Mystery of the Seven Keys	May 7, 2024 (Windows, Mac)	Nancy Drew Files #83: Diamond Deceit

=== Nancy Drew Dossier series ===
Title	Release date
Lights, Camera, Curses!	November 11, 2008 (Windows)
Resorting to Danger	August 25, 2009 (Windows)
Ship of Shadows	Canceled

== Mobile games ==
Title	Publisher	Developer	Release date	Based on
Nancy Drew Mobile Mystery: Shadow Ranch	HeR Interactive	Riptide Games	February 23, 2011 (iOS)	Nancy Drew #5: The Secret of Shadow Ranch
Nancy Drew: Codes & Clues	HeR Interactive	HeR Interactive	May 13, 2016 (iOS, Android)	

== Nintendo DS games ==
The license for Nancy Drew on Nintendo DS was not granted to HeR Interactive, but rather Majesco, and subsequently THQ. HeR Interactive did, however, co-develop a Hardy Boys video game for the system featuring Samantha Quick, a recurring character in their Nancy Drew PC game series, with similar gameplay, making it effectively a spin-off.

Title	Publisher	Developer	Release date	Based on
The Deadly Secret of Olde World Park	Majesco	Gorilla Systems	September 18, 2007	
The Mystery of the Clue Bender Society	Majesco	Gorilla Systems	July 15, 2008	
The Hidden Staircase	THQ	Gorilla Systems	September 22, 2008	Nancy Drew #2: The Hidden Staircase
The Hardy Boys: Treasure on the Tracks	Sega (USA); JoWooD (Europe)	HeR Interactive; ND Games	September 1, 2009	
The Model Mysteries	THQ	AWE Games	February 16, 2010	Nancy Drew: Girl Detective #36–38: Model Crime, Model Menace, and Model Suspect

== Other console games ==
Title	Publisher	Developer	Release date	Based on
Mystery in the Hollywood Hills	LeapFrog Enterprises		Summer 2008 (Didj)	Nancy Drew
