= Ned Nickerson =

- Nancy Drew Mystery Stories character
- First appearance: The Clue in The Diary
- Created by: Edward Stratemeyer; Mildred Benson
- Portrayed by: Frankie Thomas (1938–1939 films); George O'Hanlon Jr. (1977 TV series); Scott Speedman (1995 TV series); Nick Stabile (2002 TV film); Max Thieriot (2007 film); Tunji Kasim (2019 TV series)

In-universe information
- Occupation: Student
- Family: James Nickerson (father); Edith Nickerson (mother)
- Nationality: American

Ned Nickerson is a fictional character in the Nancy Drew Mystery Stories series written under the collective pseudonym "Carolyn Keene". Ned is often referred to as Nancy Drew's boyfriend. He first appears in The Clue in the Diary, the seventh volume in the series.

== Description ==
Ned is described as a handsome and athletic young man who stands six feet and two inches tall, with dark brown hair and brown eyes. When Nancy first meets him, he is a sophomore at Emerson College. This makes him a year or two older than the eighteen-year-old Nancy in the current series. (When introduced in the 1932 storyline, Nancy was sixteen, but it could be assumed that Ned was not greatly older, but possibly three to four years.) Aside from being a good student, Ned also plays for three of his school's varsity teams – basketball, baseball, and football. In some stories, he pursues outdoor interests including rowing and swimming, as well as scuba diving. His best friends include Buck Rodman (in the earliest, original stories), and, in revised stories and books after 1950, Burt Eddleton and Dave Evans, who are also students at Emerson. Burt and Dave also date George and Bess.

Ned frequently sells insurance during the summer, although he has also taken a variety of other jobs.

When not in school, Ned lives with his parents James and Edith in the town of Mapleton. Mapleton is near Nancy's fictional hometown of River Heights. Nancy also describes him as "the perfect boyfriend" or "the best boy a gal could have" in the 1930s editions.

== Relationship with Nancy ==
=== Nancy Drew Mystery Stories ===
Ned first meets Nancy in The Clue in the Diary, the seventh volume in the original series; however, the text of revisions in the first few volumes bear an apparent inconsistency, mentioning him as early as the fifth volume, The Secret of Shadow Ranch.

In The Clue in the Diary, Ned is at first mistaken for a car thief, but Nancy warms to him after he proves trustworthy later in the story. Throughout the revised yellow hardcovers (which include the first 56 books of the series), Ned is often described as Nancy's "special friend." The two frequently date, attending dances and the like, but commitment between them is never explicitly stated, although Ned is said to "date Nancy exclusively" in The Mystery at the Moss-Covered Mansion. However, in the paperback editions that followed (books 57 to 175), Ned is specifically described as Nancy's boyfriend. In the 1944 version of The Secret in the Old Attic elements of Gothic romance exist: Nancy, while exploring a spooky old house, is worried about Ned's recent behavior. This subplot isn't based on a second crime, but instead involves a mystery as to why Ned has invited Diane Dight for a date to a college function, instead of Nancy, and hasn't been in touch with her. This is one of the few stories that explores Nancy's emotions and feelings toward Ned; he rescues her in the story climax, in a damsel in distress setting, in the scary old mansion's attic. Nancy uncovers a plot between Diane and her own male admirer to split up the couple so they can individually pursue Ned and Nancy romantically.

Whenever he is around, Ned assists Nancy with her cases. This often results in his saving her from a life-threatening situation, but in some, Nancy rescues him. Ned often visits Nancy when he is home from college, but sometimes Nancy also visits him at Emerson. The two have also traveled extensively together, sometimes for an educational trip for Ned, or a case for Nancy, or just a vacation for both. Ned and friends often coincidentally have college or fraternity events near locales where Nancy, Bess and George are sleuthing, and are included in the action. Ned evidently admires and cares for Nancy, and he often expresses his concern for her safety throughout the series, and also expresses the wish to someday marry her, as mentioned in The Clue in the Old Album, The Witch Tree Symbol, and The Scarlet Slipper Mystery.

In The Bluebeard Room, Ned and Nancy decided to split apart and date other people. In The Phantom of Venice, it was mentioned that Nancy thought that there was something in Ned that nobody can ever have. He was the only one who she can always rely on. He was the most comforting and the best guy a girl could have but there was no further talk about that topic. In the next book, Ned was again mentioned as Nancy's boyfriend and after that book, it proved that they always found their way back. In the last book of the series, nothing changed between Ned and Nancy. He was still mentioned as her boyfriend. They kept dating each other and solved mysteries together all the time.

=== Nancy Drew Files ===
Ned is presented as Nancy's boyfriend in this series, as well; however, unlike in the original series, it is mentioned that they have been dating since high school. As the Files is also targeted at an older audience, their relationship is imbued with a little more depth. Ned and Nancy express somewhat more physical and emotional intimacy, but some stories also involve them fighting and even breaking up (the reason for which is usually connected to the case Nancy happens to be working on). In several instances, the two also end up dating other people. Fidelity, as well as Nancy's apparent lack of time to spend with Ned because of her cases, sometimes becomes an issue between them (one example of this is in SMILE AND SAY MURDER). However, in the end, they always make up.

In volume twenty-four, Till Death Do Us Part, Ned proposes to Nancy even though the probability is that she will reject him. He does this because he wants to keep a promise he made to himself about Nancy being the first girl he will ever propose to, and the situation at the time called for him to propose to another woman. In volume eight, Nancy suspects Ned of gambling. Ned gets angry and they break up. But in the later volume, Ned and Nancy meet together in a case and unite again.

And in the ending of the last book of this series (Crime at the Chat Café), a statement said: "And Nancy couldn't wait to get home to kiss her boyfriend, Ned, the same way" which gave away that Nancy and Ned kept dating each other.

=== Nancy Drew On Campus ===
Save for several books, Ned is almost completely absent from this series, which is targeted at a more mature audience. The first book, New Lives, New Loves, called for readers to dial in an 800 number to decide whether or not Ned should be kept as Nancy's boyfriend. The readers answered in the negative, as the following books featured Nancy with a new boyfriend, Jake.

=== Girl Detective ===
In the new series, Girl Detective, he is Nancy's boyfriend. It had been stated that Nancy and Ned knew each other since they were kids and started dating each other in high school. He regularly comes along with Nancy on her cases. Ned is in River Heights college and tends to be casual. He works for his father's newspaper, River Heights Bugle.

=== Nancy Drew Notebooks ===
A 9-year-old 4th grader Ned appears in the following books: The Lost Locket, The Wedding Gift Goof, The Lemonade Raid, The Day Camp Disaster. Ned sometimes seemed to be mean to Nancy, but in the last book in which he appeared (The Day Camp Disaster), he wasn't mean but really nice to Nancy, making it evident that they had become good friends.

=== Nancy Drew and the Clue Crew ===
A 9-year-old 4th grader appeared in many books in this series. This series are not completely different from the Nancy Drew Notebooks series. However in this series, Ned made more appearances. Ned and Nancy were good friends throughout the series, unlike the Notebooks, in which Ned and Nancy were rivals before becoming good friends.

=== Nancy Drew (2007) ===
In the film Nancy Drew, Ned has a huge crush on Nancy, and she feels the same for him. But on a vacation to California, Nancy meets Corky, a 12-year-old who has an obvious crush on her. When Ned visits Nancy for her birthday, Corky is rude to Ned on purpose to make him jealous. Then whenever Nancy tries to explain who Ned is to Corky, she avoids mentioning that Ned has a crush on her and she likes him back, so Corky's feelings don't get hurt. Ned is so insecure that he thinks Nancy has a crush on Corky also. But in the end, Nancy tells Ned that she doesn't like Corky, and Corky and Nancy end up being just friends. In the last scene of the movie, Ned and Nancy are back in River Heights. While Ned is fixing Nancy's car, they share a short but romantic kiss.

== Nancy Drew PC Games ==
In the Nancy Drew games presented by Her Interactive, Ned can be called and can give hints. A twist in the game shows the caring relationship between Nancy and Ned through their conversations. Ned supports Nancy, even though he does not approve of her fearlessness in life-threatening situations. Ned was voiced by Ryan Campbell in Stay Tuned for Danger and by Scott Carty starting with Treasure in the Royal Tower. Ned is a playable character in the game Alibi in Ashes.

Ned has appeared in the following Nancy Drew games:

- Secrets Can Kill (Original and Remastered)
- Stay Tuned for Danger
- Treasure in the Royal Tower
- The Final Scene
- Curse of Blackmoor Manor
- The Creature of Kapu Cave
- White Wolf of Icicle Creek
- Legend of the Crystal Skull
- The Phantom of Venice
- Haunting of Castle Malloy
- Warnings at Waverly Academy
- The Captive Curse
- Alibi in Ashes
- Ghost of Thornton Hall
- The Silent Spy
- Sea of Darkness
- Midnight in Salem
