= Nancy Drew: Shadow at the Water's Edge =

2010 video game

- Developer: Her Interactive
- Publisher: Her Interactive
- Platforms: Microsoft Windows; Mac OS X
- Release: NA: October 19, 2010
- Genre: Adventure
- Mode: Single-player

Shadow at the Water's Edge is the 23rd installment in the Nancy Drew point-and-click adventure game series by Her Interactive. The game is available for play on Microsoft Windows and Mac OS X platforms. It has an ESRB rating of E10+ for moments of mild violence and disturbing imagery. Players take on the first-person view of fictional amateur sleuth Nancy Drew and must solve the mystery through interrogation of suspects, solving puzzles, and discovering clues. There are two levels of gameplay, Junior and Senior detective modes, each offering a different difficulty level of puzzles and hints, however neither of these changes affect the plot of the game. The game is loosely based on two books, Tour of Danger (1992) and The Thirteenth Pearl (1979).

== Plot ==
Nancy Drew travels as an English teacher to Kyoto, Japan with friends Bess Marvin and George Fayne as a reward for solving the preceding mystery (Nancy Drew: Trail of the Twister). Once she arrives at her Ryokan, however, she discovers that not all is as it seems. Strange events, supposedly caused by a woman who died there mysteriously, are scaring away guests. One by one, the guests leave the Ryokan Hiei until Nancy is left only with the secretive family that owns the inn. Unable to resist a mystery, Nancy works to discover who, or what is haunting the inn.

== Characters ==
- Nancy Drew (Lani Minella) – Nancy is an 18-year-old amateur detective from the fictional town of River Heights in the United States. She is the only playable character in the game, which means the player must solve the mystery from her perspective.
- Miwako Shimizu (Mikano Fukaya) – Miwako is the receptionist at the Ryokan Hiei. She is devoted to the Ryokan and her family heritage, although, being the youngest daughter in the Shimizu family, she is not going to inherit the inn. She is a very shy, polite, and delicate person, unlike her sister Yumi. She is very upset when she hears anything about her dead mother, Kasumi. Her traditional views create tension between her and her older sister Yumi and her boyfriend Rentaro.
- Yumi Shimizu (Kira Lauren) – Yumi is the oldest daughter in the Shimizu family who runs a bento stand called Happy Bento in the inner city of Kyoto. As the eldest daughter, she is, by tradition, to inherit her family's Ryokan, although she prefers to live in the city. She has a very strained relationship with her family, due in part to her unconventional views and overbearing personality. Miwako considers her a brat, but Yumi thinks Miwako needs to have more fun.
- Rentaro Aihara (Marc Biagi) – Longtime friend and neighbor of the Shimizu's, Rentaro is also Miwako's boyfriend and the Ryokan's handyman. He is into electronics, and bought a robotic cat, Suki, for Miwako. His goofy and quirky personality sometimes annoys the Shimizus, but for the most part, they get along well. Rentaro is a friendly but eccentric person. He dreams of one day moving to the city with Miwako, but Miwako feels too tied to the inn to move.
- Takae Nagai (Waylayn Sharples) – Takae is Miwako and Yumi's grandmother. Having grown up and lived in the Ryokan her whole life, Takae has seen many things happen there, including the accidental death of her daughter, Kasumi. Still, she insists on following tradition, even if it's against both of her granddaughter's wishes. She believes Yumi should move back in order to take over the Ryokan.

Additional voice work was performed by Chris Maxfield, Naoko Nibu-Butler, Akika Tanaka, Adrienne Maclain, and Sana Watterson.

== Release ==
The game was officially released on October 19, 2010, though pre-orders began on September 20, 2010. Special editions of the game, which included bonus avatar outfits, games, commands for Suki, and outtakes, were sent out to those who pre-ordered the game directly from Her Interactive. Leading up to the game release, Her Interactive released a demo, a fictional blog for one of the game's characters, Yumi, and a micro-site featuring John Grey from Nancy Drew: Last Train to Blue Moon Canyon.

== Reception ==
Lieren Teeling of Adrenaline Vault rated it 3/5 stars and wrote, "Shadow at the Water’s Edge is a good game with a fascinating horror story to enjoy, but the need to solve large number puzzles could make the game less appealing to some people." Ryan Casey of Just Adventure rated it A− and wrote, "It shows a lot of effort, especially with thoughtful puzzles instead of chores, but maintains the elements that have made its most successful predecessors so praiseworthy." Erin Bell of Gamezebo rated it 4/5 stars and wrote that the game is fun and educational, but some players may be frustrated by the challenging puzzles that can not be skipped. Heidi Fournier of Adventure Gamers rated it 3/5 stars and wrote, "While not the best of the series, Shadow at the Water’s Edge is still a solid Nancy Drew entry that takes decent advantage of its exotic location."

Preceded by Nancy Drew: Secrets Can Kill Remastered; Nancy Drew: Trail of the Twister	Nancy Drew Computer Games	Succeeded by Nancy Drew: The Captive Curse
