= Nancy Drew: Mystery of the Seven Keys =

2024 video game

- Developers: HeR Interactive; Room 8 Group
- Publisher: HeR Interactive
- Engine: Unity
- Platforms: Windows macOS
- Release: NA: May 7, 2024
- Genre: Adventure
- Mode: Single-player

Mystery of the Seven Keys is the 34th installment of the Nancy Drew point-and-click adventure game series by HeR Interactive. The game takes on the first-person view of Nancy Drew and must solve the mystery by questioning suspects, solving puzzles, and discovering clues. The game has two levels of difficulty: Amateur sleuth and Master sleuth. The Amateur sleuth's difficulty offers a task list and gives the possibility of hints in-game, compared to the Master sleuth option which has no task list, no hints, and more challenging puzzles. This is the first game of the series that offers a dual navigation system: point-and-click and free-roam. It has an ESRB rating of E10+ for moments of mild violence. It is loosely based on the 83rd novel from the Nancy Drew Files series, Diamond Deceit.

== Development and release ==
Development on the game began in 2021 in collaboration with Room 8 Group. The game was officially announced by HeR Interactive in April, 2023 and was released on May 7, 2024.

== Reception ==
Christina Rohlf from Room Escape Artist mentions "The graphics and new movement style are excellent, the dialogue enhanced the story, and the game was lengthy and filled with puzzles of a wide variety of types. However, the inclusion of illogical or unclear puzzles makes it clear that the Nancy Drew franchise still has room to improve to get back to the quality of Sea of Darkness". Hoover Richard from Adventure Game Hotspot rates the game 70% mentioning that "The pendulum has swung back from the greater focus on story and character interaction in the previous installment, but fans of the classic series will doubtless welcome the renewed emphasis on puzzle solving this time around".

| Preceded by Nancy Drew: Midnight in Salem | Nancy Drew video games | Succeeded by Unknown |
