= Nancy Drew: Last Train to Blue Moon Canyon =

2005 video game

- Developer: Her Interactive
- Publisher: DreamCatcher
- Composer: Kevin Manthei
- Series: Nancy Drew
- Platform: Microsoft Windows
- Release: NA: September 2005
- Genre: Adventure
- Mode: Single player

Last Train to Blue Moon Canyon is the 13th installment in the Nancy Drew point-and-click adventure game series by Her Interactive. The game is available for play on Microsoft Windows platforms. It has an ESRB rating of E for moments of mild violence and peril. Players take on the first-person view of fictional amateur sleuth Nancy Drew and must solve the mystery through interrogation of suspects, solving puzzles, and discovering clues. There are two levels of gameplay, Junior and Senior detective modes, each offering a different difficulty level of puzzles and hints, however neither of these changes affect the plot of the game. The game is loosely based on the book Mystery Train.

== Plot ==
The Hardy Boys have invited Nancy Drew to join them on a train trip to Colorado hosted by Lori Girard, a wealthy, young socialite. Lori has invited the Hardy Boys along with ghost-hunting television personality John Grey, police detective Tino Balducci, and historical romance novelist Charleena Purcell to help her solve the mystery of what happened to Jake Hurley, the man who originally owned the train. One day in 1903, the train was found in Blue Moon Canyon, Nevada with only the dead engineer on board. Jake Hurley was never seen again. It is rumored that he had found one of the most valuable gold mines in the world and that his wife, Camille, who had previously died on board, has haunted the train for centuries.

As soon as the train takes off, Lori mysteriously disappears. After consulting with the other passengers and solving puzzles, Nancy eventually finds her in the train's caboose, having faked her own disappearance by utilizing a secret entrance behind a bookshelf in the dining car. Lori was hoping that any person smart enough to find her would also be able to lead the crew to Jake Hurley's lost mine. She gives Nancy a letter written by Jake Hurley to his niece with clues on how to find the location of the mine.

A few hours later, someone throws the train's emergency brake, causing the train to lurch to a sudden stop. Nancy and the Hardy Boys discuss the possibility that someone on the train - or something (namely Camille's ghost) - tried to derail the train on purpose. Nancy learns that John Grey, who has been trying to pick up electromagnetic signals on the train in an attempt to communicate with Camille, will soon get his television show canceled unless he makes a big discovery. She also learns that Tino and Lori used to be in a romantic relationship, but Tino broke up with Lori because he feared being seen with her would damage reputation, and that Charleena used one of Lori's ideas in a recent novel without compensating or crediting her for it.

The train arrives in Copper Gorge, and Nancy meets Fatima, the owner of a local gift shop, whose great-great-uncle Buell was referenced in one of Jake Hurley's letters. The Hardy Boys meet the grandson of the train's engineer who died on board in 1903, and overhear him telling a waitress a major clue to finding Jake's mine. Back on the train, Tino admits to pulling the emergency brake and trying to frame John in an attempt to boost his own career by making it look like he solved the mystery. Nancy solves puzzles and discovers that Jake's mine is located in Brimstone Canyon, not far from Blue Moon Canyon. Lori directs the train engineer to go there, and Nancy enters the mine. But then, the train leaves Nancy without warning.

Inside the mine, Nancy finds Jake Hurley's skeleton along with a letter written to him by Abraham Lincoln on the day of his assassination. Lori appears in the mine, having secretly followed Nancy knowing such a letter might be located there. Lori attempts to seal Nancy inside the mine so she can take sole credit for finding the letter and reach a new level of fame. Nancy manages to escape, stopping Lori from leaving. The Hardy Boys arrive, mentioning that when they noticed both Nancy and Lori missing, they told the train engineer to head back to the drop off location. Lincoln's letter is recovered, and Lori's father cuts her off financially after learning of her attempt on Nancy's life. At the train station, John and Charleena have a yelling match, which causes the media's attention to turn from Tino, leaving him bitter.

== Development ==
=== Characters ===
- Nancy Drew - Nancy is an 18-year-old amateur detective from the fictional town of River Heights in the United States. She is the main playable character in the game, and the player must solve the mystery from her perspective.
- Frank Hardy and Joe Hardy - These brothers are not strangers to mysteries. They conduct investigations and go undercover for ATAC (American Teens Against Crime). Frank and Joe are old friends of Nancy and invited her to join them on the train trip. They assist Nancy with the case and can provide her with helpful information. Frank is a brief playable character.
- Lori Girard - Beautiful and rich Lori loves parties, especially a party on a haunted train with world-famous detectives bound for an unknown destination to discover a century-old secret. Lori disappears soon after the train takes off. What could have happened to her?
- Tino Balducci - Tino is a hot-shot detective who recently solved a big case in Chicago. Some people say it was just luck, but Tino's out to show them that he is the best detective. How far would he be willing to go to prove it?
- Charleena Purcell - First introduced as a phone character in The Secret of Shadow Ranch, Charleena's romance novels have sold millions of copies and won awards for historical excellence, but she's not interested in parties. She's done her homework about Jake Hurley though. Does she know more about the treasure than she's letting on?
- John Grey - The host of TV's Ghost Chasers, John analyzes electromagnetic fields to determine if there are any ghosts in the area. He thinks that the ghost of Jake Hurley's wife may know something about Lori's disappearance. Does he know more than he's saying?
- Fatima - Fatima works at the Copper Gorge Museum and Taffy Shop and wears a cartoon miner costume. She is a huge fan of Charleena Purcell. Fatima can go from nice to mean in a split second if you touch any of the artifacts in the museum without her permission.

=== Cast ===
- Nancy Drew - Lani Minella
- Frank Hardy - Wayne Rawley
- Joe Hardy - Rob Jones
- Lori Girard - Sarah Papineau
- Charleena Purcell - Julia Francis
- John Grey - Lowell Deo
- Tino Balducci - Jeff Minnerly
- Bess Marvin - Alisa Murray
- George Fayne - Patty Pomplun
- Fatima / Waitress - Amy Broomhall
- Engineer / Oldtimer / Additional Voices - Jason Sharp

== Reception ==
According to review aggregation website Metacritic, Nancy Drew: Last Train to Blue Moon Canyon received "generally favorable reviews" from critics. The Blade noted the game as the fifth best-selling game on Amazon.com for the week of September 15th, 2005.

Preceded by Nancy Drew: Secret of the Old Clock	Nancy Drew Computer Games	Succeeded by Nancy Drew: Danger By Design
