= Nancy Drew: Ransom of the Seven Ships =

2009 video game

- Developer: Her Interactive
- Publisher: Her Interactive
- Platform: Microsoft Windows
- Release: NA: July 14, 2009
- Genre: Adventure
- Mode: Single-player

Ransom of the Seven Ships is the 20th installment in the Nancy Drew point-and-click adventure game series by Her Interactive. The game is available for play on Microsoft Windows platforms. It has an ESRB rating of E for moments of mild violence and peril. Players take on the first-person view of fictional amateur sleuth Nancy Drew and must solve the mystery through interrogation of suspects, solving puzzles, and discovering clues. There are two levels of gameplay, Junior and Senior detective modes, each offering a different difficulty level of puzzles and hints, however neither of these changes affect the plot of the game. The game is loosely based on the book The Broken Anchor (1983).

Her Interactive discontinued the game in July 2020, removing it from digital retailers over concerns of the inclusion of a white Australian character who portrays himself as a Jamaican native.

== Plot ==
Bess Marvin wins a five-day vacation in the Bahamas and has invited Nancy Drew and George Fayne to go with her. Before Nancy arrives at the resort, Bess is kidnapped, and the only way to save her is to solve a 300-year-old Bahamian mystery. Dangerous waters keep treasure hunters from exploring the reefs around Dread Isle, but this remote island might hide the riches of El Toro's lost fleet of seven ships. Can Nancy track down the treasure before time runs out?

== Development ==
=== Characters ===
- Nancy Drew - Nancy is an 18-year-old amateur detective from the fictional town of River Heights in the United States. She is the main playable character in the game, and the player solves portions of the mystery from her perspective.
- George Fayne - George is one of Nancy's best friends and Bess' cousin. She is sensible and matter-of-fact about life. She is the one who remembers the small details and is the best with technology. On Dread Isle, she feels helpless when Bess is kidnapped and tries to fix a satellite phone. George is also a playable character, and the player solves portions of the mystery from her perspective.
- Bess Marvin - Bess is a little boy crazy, but she's great with people and is able to persuade them to do anything! With an awesome fashion sense and a cheery disposition, she can be coaxed into helping Nancy on a case. But when Bess is kidnapped on Dread Isle, she'll need Nancy's help to escape.
- Johnny Rolle - Johnny is stuck on Dread Isle because some monkeys trashed his boat. He can't leave until the repairs are finished. Since he's been on the island longer than Nancy and George, perhaps he can help find Bess, or was he the one who kidnapped her in the first place?
- Coucou - Coucou is a smart-talking double yellow-headed amazon parrot. She hears the secrets people whisper, but won't tell unless you give her a treat!
- The Gibsons - The Gibsons are the owners of the resort where Nancy, George and Bess are staying. George suspects that they are the kidnappers because the map found in the diving supply closet seems to show that they have been tracking Nancy's movements. Are George's suspicions true?

=== Cast ===
- Nancy Drew / Coucou the parrot / Monkeys - Lani Minella
- Johnny Rolle - Jonah von Spreekin
- George Fayne - Chiara Motley
- Bess Marvin - Jennifer Pratt
- Pilot - Keith Dahlgren
- Roy MacGuffin - George Kaplan
- Kidnapper 1 - Bruno Personne
- Kidnapper 2 - Dieter Niemand

== Reception ==
Reception

Aggregate score
Aggregator	Score
Metacritic	78/100

Review scores
Publication	Score
Adventure Gamers	3.5/5
GameZone	9.3/10
IGN	7.3/10

== Discontinuation ==
The game was delisted from Steam and Her Interactive's website in July 2020. Refinery29 reported that the game had been removed due to racist content, specifically the plot point of a white character disguising himself as a Jamaican man for much of the game. Her Interactive confirmed this reason for its delisting in a response to a fan's e-mail, stating that the company is "committed to being sensitive and respectful to people of color, and therefore have discontinued the availability of this game."

Preceded by Nancy Drew: The Haunting of Castle Malloy	Nancy Drew Computer Games	Succeeded by Nancy Drew: Warnings at Waverly Academy
