= Nancy Drew: Midnight in Salem =

2019 video game

- Developers: Her Interactive, Mi'pu'mi Games
- Publisher: HeR Interactive
- Engine: Unity
- Platforms: Microsoft Windows, Mac OS
- Release: December 3, 2019
- Genre: Adventure
- Mode: Single-player

Midnight in Salem is a point-and-click adventure game, the 33rd installment in the Nancy Drew series by HeR Interactive. Players take on the first-person view of a fictional amateur sleuth Nancy Drew and must solve the mystery through interrogation of suspects, solving puzzles, and discovering clues. There are two levels of difficulty: Junior and Senior Detective. The Senior Detective mode features increased puzzle difficulty as well as reduced amounts of tips and automatically recorded notes. It is the first game in the series to be made in the Unity game engine, as well as the first to feature Brittany Cox as the voice of Nancy Drew instead of longtime voice actress Lani Minella.

== Plot ==
Nancy Drew finds herself in Salem, Massachusetts to investigate an arson to the Hathorne estate. The Hathorne House was originally built by Judge John Hathorne, the inquisitor of the infamous Salem witch trials. It was also the final home to 102-year-old Frances Tuttle, his last direct descendant. When Tuttle died, the estate became city property, and while the mayor was seeking a manager to oversee the estate, the home burst into flames. The ongoing investigation before Nancy appeared had little evidence, and as a result, the citizens accused Mei Parry of arson and pressured the police to arrest the teenager. As Nancy races to uncover the truth behind the arson, she discovers connections to the house’s past with the Salem trials and struggles with unexplainable supernatural events.

=== Characters ===
- Nancy Drew: An amateur detective who visits Salem, Massachusetts to uncover the mystery behind a series of recent arson cases.
- Deirdre Shannon: Nancy's recurring rival, who occasionally helps Nancy through phone conversations throughout the game. Cousin of Mei Perry.
- Mei Parry: A young woman with a mysterious past who often receives scorn from townsfolk due to her burn scars.
- Teegan Parry: A young woman with a cheerful, optimistic personality, but short temper. Sister of Mei Perry.
- Olivia Ravencroft: A local tour guide who uses witchcraft themed entertainment to attract customers.
- Lauren Holt: The heir to a local historical estate who also owns a witchcraft-themed tea shop.
- Judge Danforth: A local judge often perplexed by modern technology and trends.
- Alicia Cole: An attorney moved from a larger city to Salem to work with Judge Danforth.
- Jason Danforth: The wealthy son of Judge Danforth who is haunted by a childhood experience with the supernatural.
- Frank and Joe Hardy: Teenage brothers who work as amateur detectives and aid Nancy over the phone through hints and conversation.
- Ned Nickerson: Nancy's boyfriend, who is written to before and after the game.

== Development and release ==
Midnight in Salem was released on December 3, 2019. Unlike previous games in the Nancy Drew adventure game series Midnight in Salem features full 3D graphics, with players able to "look around" within the scene, as opposed to viewing only from predetermined angles.

== Reception ==
Midnight in Salem received mixed to poor reviews upon release, with many deriding its graphics, puzzles, and performance - but praising its plot and characters. AdventureGamers.com stated "Its character animations and lip sync can be quite off-putting, its node-based movement retains the awkwardness common to all such navigation, and what few puzzles it has are hardly challenging, even on the harder difficulty setting. Yet for all that, the charm of its characters and the intrigue of its story manage to buoy the experience up". Others praised its educational content and focus on a primarily female cast, but listed it as "clunky" - stating that Mac users may have to run the game in low resolution to get the game to function properly.

Preceded by Nancy Drew: Sea of Darkness	Nancy Drew video games	Succeeded by Nancy Drew: Mystery of the Seven Keys
