= Nancy Drew: Curse of Blackmoor Manor =

2004 video game

- Developer: Her Interactive
- Publisher: DreamCatcher
- Composer: Kevin Manthei
- Series: Nancy Drew
- Platforms: DVD player, Windows
- Release: NA: October 5, 2004 (Win); NA: June 2006 (DVD)
- Genre: Adventure
- Mode: Single player

Curse of Blackmoor Manor is the 11th game in the Nancy Drew point-and-click adventure game series by Her Interactive. The game is available for play on Microsoft Windows platforms as well as on DVD, Steam, and GOG.com released a digital version on their site. It has an ESRB rating of E for moments of mild violence and peril. Players take on the first-person view of fictional amateur sleuth Nancy Drew and must solve the mystery through interrogation of suspects, solving puzzles, and discovering clues. There are two levels of gameplay, Junior and Senior detective modes, each offering a different difficulty level of puzzles and hints; however neither of these changes affect the actual plot of the game. The game is loosely based on the book The Bluebeard Room (1985).

== Plot ==
Nancy Drew travels to England at the request of her neighbor, Mrs. Petrov, to investigate strange behavior from her daughter Linda, who has recently married Hugh Penvellyn, an English diplomat. Linda is currently living in Blackmoor Manor, a 14th-century mansion inhabited for many centuries by the storied Penvellyn family. Linda has become bedridden, refusing to come out from behind her bed curtain, and has developed strange symptoms including extreme hunger and thirst, a craving for raw meat, hairy hands, and uncharacteristic bursts of anger at her new husband. Hugh is away on business, so the only other current residents of the mansion are Jane Penvellyn, Hugh's 12-year-old daughter from a previous marriage; Leticia Drake, Hugh's aunt; and Nigel Mookerjee, a historian who is researching the manor and the Penvellyn family. Jane's private tutor, Ethel Bosinny, also visits the manor for several hours each day to teach her lessons.

When Nancy arrives at the front door of the mansion, her name is called out by what appears to be a mysterious creature with glowing red eyes. Mrs. Drake answers the door but does not see the creature, and she immediately dismisses Nancy's concerns. When Nancy meets Jane, she tells her that she saw a "lady in black" putting something on Linda's nightstand, and her symptoms developed shortly thereafter.

Nancy learns from Nigel that the Penvellyn family have long been rumored to be guarding a precious treasure within the mansion. The Penvellyns also have a troubled history: in the 17th century, Elinor Penvellyn was rumored to have cursed her husband and turned him into the "Beast of Blackmoor," a creature with glowing red eyes and sharp fangs, after he found out about the family treasure. Elinor was later burned at the stake after being convicted of witchcraft by Oliver Cromwell.

Nancy visits Linda, who tells her that during her first days in the mansion she accidentally discovered a secret passageway in which she found an ancient curse written on the wall, and upon returning to her bedroom she found a note on her nightstand with the same curse written on it. Linda believes the curse is causing her symptoms, and insists that Nancy leave her alone and go home. Nancy discovers multiple connecting secret passageways throughout the mansion that are filled with puzzles that appear to lead to the family treasure. She also consults an expert in lycanthropy about the possibility that Linda is turning into a werewolf.

Late one night, Nancy witnesses Jane and Ethel performing a mysterious ritual during which they pour oil down a hole in the center of the manor's Great Hall. Around the same time, Nancy learns that according to Penvellyn family tradition, Linda is required to live at the manor for six months in order for Hugh to fully inherit it from his late father, Mrs. Drake's brother Alan Penvellyn, and that Mrs. Drake will instead be the heir if Linda moves out before the six months are up.

Eventually, Nancy solves puzzles in the Great Hall and the secret passageways that lead her to the Penvellyn family treasure, a large meteorite. She is confronted in the treasure room by Jane, who admits to causing Linda's symptoms by putting hair-growth treatment in her moisturizer and sneaking Mrs. Drake's allergy pills in her food, because Jane wants her father to reconcile with her biological mother so they can be a family again. After Jane apologizes to her father, stepmother, and great-aunt, they resolve to do whatever it takes to be a family.

== Development ==
=== Characters ===
- Nancy Drew - Nancy is an 18-year-old amateur detective from the fictional town of River Heights in the United States. She is the only playable character in the game, which means the player must solve the mystery from her perspective.
- Linda Penvellyn - Linda married Hugh Penvellyn and recently moved from the United States to England. She currently resides in Blackmoor Manor and refuses to let anyone see her face. She believes that she is cursed and fears that Nancy will be cursed as well. What is she hiding besides her face?
- Jane Penvellyn - Jane is Linda's 12-year-old, attention-deprived stepdaughter. She is unhappy with her move to Blackmoor Manor because she enjoyed being raised in the U.S. Very curious and smart, she is knowledgeable about the manor's secrets — does she know more about Linda than she's saying?
- Mrs. Drake - Mrs. Drake is Jane's great-aunt. She spends her days tending plants in the manor's conservatory. She puts up a no-nonsense attitude and is truly confounded and frustrated by the recent spate of events. Outwardly she scoffs at the issue of curses and witches, but she is superstitious herself.
- Nigel Mookerjee - Nigel is a historian currently researching and cataloging the Blackmoor Manor library. Nigel is interested in writing a history of the Penvellyn family. Could he be the one who can help find the key to unlocking the past? But what's really behind his keen interest in the manor and its quirky inhabitants?
- Ethel Bosinny - Ethel is Jane's tutor and comes from a long line of tutors to the Penvellyn Clan. She is very mysterious; her oh-so-charming demeanor has an edge that hints at something deeper. Is there something painful in her past, or is she hiding a secret?
- Loulou - Loulou is an intelligent 80-year-old parrot who gives hints and loves "yummy cakes." She is a reference to the parrot in Gustave Flaubert's 1877 story Un coeur simple.

=== Cast ===
- Nancy Drew / Loulou – Lani Minella
- Mrs. Drake – Amy Broomhall
- Jane Penvellyn – Conni Ellern
- Linda Penvellyn – Jenn Ruzumna
- Ethel Bosinny – Sarah Papineau
- Nigel Mookerjee – Stephen Hando
- Mrs. Petrov – Dora Lanier
- Ned Nickerson – Scott Carty
- Hugh Penvellyn / Tommy Tucker / Alan Penvellyn – Jonah von Spreekin
- Paliki Vadas – Alyssa Keene
- Max Holechek – 1930s Radio Announcer (Secret of the Old Clock trailer)

== Reception ==
Reception

Review score
Publication	Score
USA Today	4.5/5

In the United States, Curse of Blackmoor Manor's computer version sold between 100,000 and 300,000 units by August 2006. At that time, the combined sales of the Nancy Drew computer game series had reached 2.1 million sales in the United States alone. Remarking upon this success, Edge called Nancy Drew a "powerful franchise". Curse of Blackmoor Manor also received "generally favorable reviews" from critics, according to review aggregation website Metacritic. In 2011, Adventure Gamers named it the 99th-best adventure game ever released.

In The New York Times, Charles Herold praised Blackmoor Manor's "intelligent game design", and considered its use of mini-games to be its only downside. He concluded that "clever puzzles and an interesting plot make it the best Nancy Drew game since The Final Scene". Jinny Gudmundsen of USA Today gave the game a 4 ½ stars out of five, saying "best for teens 13 and up because it's a little scarier, its puzzles are harder, and its themes of witchcraft, lycanthropy, and alchemy make it more appropriate for an older audience". Lonnie Brown of The Ledger also gave the game a positive review, saying "The graphics are well done, and the music and characters fit the mood" and called the "second chance" button a "very nice feature".

Laura MacDonald of Adventure Gamers gave the game a mixed review (4 out of 5 stars), complimenting the graphics, cinematics and animation but felt the "non-linear gameplay can leave a player lost if they don't play a sustained game; though the story is well done, could have been more developed". However, she called it an overall "solid addition to the series and likely the best Nancy Drew game of them all...this is a definite buy".

Tally Ho of Just Adventure gave the game a positive review, calling the graphics "the best of the series" and enlarged playing are a "good thing". However, Ho thought "forcing the player to repeat a fairly difficult task again and again, even after beating it is really unfair".

Preceded by Nancy Drew: The Secret of Shadow Ranch	Nancy Drew Computer Games	Succeeded by Nancy Drew: Secret of the Old Clock
