= Nancy Drew: The Creature of Kapu Cave =

2006 video game

- Developer: Her Interactive
- Publisher: DreamCatcher
- Platform: Microsoft Windows
- Release: October 12, 2006
- Genre: Adventure
- Mode: Single player

The Creature of Kapu Cave is a point-and-click adventure game and the 15th installment in the Nancy Drew series by Her Interactive. The game is available on Windows. Players take on the first-person view of fictional amateur sleuth Nancy Drew and must solve the mystery through interrogation of suspects, solving puzzles, and discovering clues. There are two levels of gameplay, Junior and Senior detective modes, each offering a different difficulty level of puzzles and hints, however neither of these changes affect the plot of the game. The game is loosely based on the 1998 book Mystery on Maui in the Nancy Drew Mystery Stories.

== Plot ==
=== Cast ===
- Nancy Drew - Lani Minella
- Frank Hardy - Jonah Von Spreekin
- Joe Hardy - Rob Jones
- Ned Nickerson - Scott Carty
- Big Island Mike Mapu - Ross Douglas
- Dr. Quigley Kim / Phone Recording - Leslie Wadsworth
- Malachi Craven - Dan Murphy
- Pua Mapu - Judith Knowles
- Richard Aikens / Pawnbroker / Johnny Kuto / Yellow Suit Guard - Don Darryl Rivera
- Gate Guard - RFA Krolmeister
- Dr. Kim's Employer - Anne Grant

== Development ==
The game went gold on September 15, 2006.

== Reception ==
Reception

Review scores
Publication	Score
Detroit Free Press	2/4
GameZone	6.5/10
Jeuxvideo.com	10/20

Preceded by Nancy Drew: Danger By Design	Nancy Drew Computer Games	Succeeded by Nancy Drew: The White Wolf of Icicle Creek
