= Captive Witness =

Nancy Drew 64, published 1981

- First edition
- Author: Carolyn Keene
- Cover artist: Ruth Sanderson
- Language: English
- Series: Nancy Drew stories
- Genre: Detective, mystery novel
- Published: November 11, 1981
- Publisher: Wanderer Books
- Publication place: United States
- Media type: Print (paperback)
- Pages: 186
- Preceded by: The Twin Dilemma
- Followed by: Mystery of the Winged Lion

Captive Witness is the 64th volume in the Nancy Drew Stories series. It was originally published in 1981 by the Wanderer imprint of Simon & Schuster and ghostwritten by Richard Ballard. Scholastic also released a version of the book, titled as Captive Witness Mystery. The original edition cover was by Ruth Sanderson, with six internal illustrations by Paul Frame.

== Plot summary ==
Nancy is on a student tour of Austria with Emerson college. After an attempted theft, the tour leader, professor Raymond Bagley, tells Nancy of his secret mission: to smuggle ten children aged six to thirteen out of an Iron Curtain country to relatives in England, France, and the United States. Another Emerson student, Eric Nagy, who had been paralyzed by an accident and uses a wheelchair, is also in on the mission as his thirteen-year-old cousin is one of the children.

Upon arriving in Salzburg, the large group finds that their hotel reservations have been canceled. An obnoxious man named Herr Gutterman offers reservations at another hotel for a large group that had canceled. Grudgingly, the professor accepts the offer as there is no other alternative.

At the hotel, Nancy focuses on an assignment given to her by her father. A famous film director named Kurt Kessler created a devastating political film about the oppression of human rights in his home country in Eastern Europe. However, the film was stolen and the studio with the negative burned down, so the stolen film is the only copy of Kessler's Captive Witness. Kessler had hoped to enter a film contest in five days, and unless Nancy can find his film, he will not be able to show the world his important work.

ancy thinks that the stolen film is in Vienna, which the tour will not reach for another few days, so she convinces her boyfriend Ned Nickerson to drive there with her. Because no rental cars are available, Nancy convinces Herr Gutterman to take her and Ned in his car. As soon as they leave, however, Nancy realizes that she and Ned are being kidnapped by Herr Gutterman, who is the person who tried to steal Professor Bagley's luggage. Herr Gutterman and his chauffeur, Herr Burger, drive Nancy and Ned high into the Alps. Herr Burger is not a cautious driver, and the car almost goes over the edge of a cliff.

Later, Gutterman and Burger drive up to a small cabin high in the Alps. They question Nancy, but she escapes and steals their car. The car is amphibious, and she and Ned drive into a river that turns into a waterfall. They make it safely to Vienna.

After an attempt to find the film fails, Nancy goes with Gutterman and sees half of Captive Witness. She returns to the hotel to meet Ned, and later the rest of the tour arrives.

While they are eating lunch, a man tells Professor Bagley that he has a message for him regarding the children. But before he can say anything, he has a heart attack. While being lifted into the ambulance, the man keeps looking at Eric as if trying to say something. Nancy has a sudden idea and takes apart Eric's wheelchair, where she finds an envelope containing information on where to bring the children across the border. She meets Emile Popov, who asks for help in the rescue mission as two of the couples who planned to help the operation have been arrested, and the refugee organization does not have anyone it can spare. Eric reveals that he can actually walk, and Nancy then devises a daring plan. She send her friends on a decoy mission to throw Gutterman off the trail, and she and Eric successfully rescue the children with the help of Emile Popov and his wife. She then finds the stolen film, Captive Witness. It is shown at the film festival and wins first prize.

== Background ==
Captive Witness was ghostwritten by Richard Ballard. Due to its primary plot of pre-Glasnost international intrigue, many have theorized the title was originally written to be a part of The Hardy Boys series. In 2005, Simon & Schuster allowed Captive Witness and the seven titles before it to be republished by Grosset & Dunlap in hardcover "glossy flashlight" format for the first time. The reasoning behind it was for the 75th anniversary of the Nancy Drew character, and the 100th anniversary of the Stratemeyer Syndicate.

== Artwork ==
The original edition featured cover art by Ruth Sanderson and six internal illustrations by Paul Frame. It was published under the Wanderer imprint of Simon and Schuster. It was later republished under both Wanderer (1986, cover art by Hector Garrido) and Minstrel (1990, cover art by Linda Thomas) printings with a new cover each time. These two later printings did not include the internal illustrations. Scholastic also released the book in 1981 under the title "Captive Witness Mystery", with different cover art by Kinuko Craft.

== Adaptation ==
The 24th installment in the Nancy Drew point-and-click adventure game series by Her Interactive, named Nancy Drew: The Captive Curse, is loosely based on the novel.
