= Nancy Drew: Alibi in Ashes =

2011 video game

Alibi In Ashes
- Developer: Her Interactive
- Publisher: Her Interactive
- Platforms: Microsoft Windows; Mac OS X
- Release: 18 October 2011
- Genre: Adventure
- Mode: Single-player

Alibi in Ashes is the 25th installment in the Nancy Drew point-and-click adventure game series by Her Interactive. The game is available for play on Microsoft Windows and Mac OS X platforms. It has an ESRB rating of E for moments of mild violence and peril. Players take on the first-person view of fictional amateur sleuth Nancy Drew and must solve the mystery through interrogation of suspects, solving puzzles, and discovering clues. There are two levels of gameplay, Junior and Senior detective modes, each offering a different difficulty level of puzzles and hints, however neither of these changes affects the plot of the game. The game is loosely based on the books False Impressions (1990) and The Clues Challenge (2000).

== Plot ==
Nancy Drew returns to her hometown of River Heights, Illinois to compete in the town's annual Clues Challenge along with her boyfriend Ned and her friends Bess and George. A mysterious note leads her to the old town hall, which suddenly catches fire and burns to the ground while she is exploring it. When she escapes, she finds some townspeople outside the building: Deirdre Shannon, an old classmate and "frenemy" of Nancy's; Antonia "Toni" Scallari, a town councilwoman who owns the local ice cream shop; Brenda Carlton, a journalist and newscaster; and Alexei Markovic, a former detective who now owns an antique store. Nancy is interviewed by the police, who subsequently arrest her for arson and send her to the county jail.

The police chief tells Nancy that he will release her if she can prove her innocence. She tasks Ned, Bess, and George with collecting various pieces of evidence and dropping them off in the jail's mailbox. As Nancy's friends work to clear her name, they discover that Deirdre was following Nancy to the town hall on the night of the fire; Toni, who is in the midst of a reelection campaign, had to let all her employees go at the ice cream shop due to financial struggles; Brenda is still bitter about Nancy previously breaking a news story about fake antiques before Brenda could, resulting in Brenda's planned cable special getting canceled; and Alexei was found guilty as a young man of trespass and negligence related to his alleged theft of an antique lens from a local home (although he was found not guilty of theft). Nancy's friends also find ether in Alexei's shop, toluene in Toni's ice cream store, and acetone in Brenda's van.

Eventually, Nancy and her friends gather sufficient evidence against the other suspects to convince the police chief to release Nancy from jail. Nancy interviews the suspects herself, and discovers that Toni is a shareholder in the land that the town hall sat on and thus stands to profit from the destruction of the building. Nancy finds a network of secret underground tunnels beneath River Heights, and realizes Brenda has been using them to get to many interviews in quick succession and also used them to get to the town hall on the day of the fire. She confronts Brenda about leaving her the notes and luring her to the old town hall in an attempt to kill her, which Brenda admits, saying it would have made a great story.

Nancy and George use a jammer to intercept Brenda's news signal before she can break the story implicating Nancy in the arson. Brenda confronts Nancy in the underground tunnels and admits that she started the fire in the town hall with the purpose of framing Nancy to increase Brenda's fame and status as a journalist. Brenda locks Nancy in the tunnel, but Nancy escapes and takes the newfound evidence to the police station. Brenda is arrested live on air, Toni drops out of the town council race after the public learns of her corruption, Alexei is vindicated of his previous crime due to new evidence discovered at the town hall, and the remainder of the town hall is demolished and replaced with a museum celebrating the history of River Heights.

== Gameplay ==
The game is the first in the Nancy Drew series to feature four playable characters: Nancy, Ned, Bess, and George. The player can change which character they are playing at any time by calling that character on the phone and selecting the dialogue option that says "I'm passing the case to you." The playable characters are each liked and disliked by different suspects, and the player must strategize accordingly when trying to get information or favors out of the townspeople. For example, Toni is fond of Bess due to Bess's love for ice cream, but Alexei dislikes Bess because she clumsily knocked over and broke a vase in his store.

== Development ==
=== Playable Characters ===
- Nancy Drew (Lani Minella) - Nancy is an 18-year-old amateur detective from the fictional town of River Heights in the United States. Nancy has been arrested on suspicion of arson. She has access to all of the police station's equipment in order to help prove her innocence.
- Ned Nickerson (Scott Carty) - Ned is Nancy's longtime and loyal boyfriend. He arranged for the team to participate in the River Heights Clues Challenge. When Nancy is arrested, he is ready to help her clear her name in any way he can, even if it means using his charm and handsome features to learn more information and distract suspects.
- Bess Marvin (Jennifer Pratt) - Bess is one of Nancy's best friends. She is a sweet, positive, but sometimes high-strung girl who is worried about Nancy. She is willing to set aside her anxiety in order to help get Nancy out of jail and prove her innocence. Her skill in gossiping could lure the right information out of a suspect, so long as her brain doesn't freeze from eating too much ice cream.
- George Fayne (Chiara Motley) - George, Nancy's other best friend, tends to be more sensible and down to earth than her cousin, Bess. Though her less optimistic outlook can make conversing with suspects difficult, when given the opportunity, George knows just what questions to ask. Her energy and love for high tech gadgetry will come in handy to Nancy and the case.

=== Characters ===
- Toni Scallari (Laura Hanson) - Toni stays busy as an elected official on the River Heights City Council, but keeps in touch with her voters by running the local ice cream parlor, Scoop. Toni holds great sway in the community, and appears to be approachable and pleasant. Is this practiced politician's friendly facade covering up darker secrets?
- Alexei Markovic (Gene Thorkildsen) - Alexei is River Heights' eccentric quasi-recluse who owns the antique shop. He used to be an amateur detective until a case went awry that ruined his reputation. With his knowledge of the town and its history, how far would Alexei go to try to clear his name?
- Deirdre Shannon (Meaghan Halverson) - Deirdre is an old classmate of Nancy's. She is a spoiled rich girl whose family is constantly being bested by the Drews', and the Clues Challenge is proving to be no different. Competitive, haughty, and arrogant, she's tired of placing second. How far will she go to top Nancy in this competition?
- Brenda Carlton (Megan Jones) - Brenda considers herself an ace crime reporter for the Heights Nine News Team. Her impulsive style tends to put sensationalism over accuracy, regardless of the cost to others. Could she have a deeper story hiding behind her microphone?
- Chief McGinnis (Mark Dodson) - Chief McGinnis is the head of the local police department and has worked with Nancy on cases many times before. He doesn't quite believe Nancy is guilty, but he is pressured to take her into custody with the evidence surrounding her. McGinnis is willing to let Nancy work on proving her innocence while being held at the police station.

Additional voice work was performed by Jennifer Pratt, Alex Yopp, James Crowder, Robert Riedl, and Ian Schwartz.

== Reception ==
Jinny Gudmundsen of USA Today rated it 2.5/4 stars and wrote, "Alibi in Ashes is a good mystery game, particularly for younger players new to the Nancy Drew franchise; but seasoned players of the series might be disappointed...While it is fun to explore Nancy's hometown of River Heights and her childhood house, the game limits your investigation areas to only a few actual locations. And the switching-between-friends mechanic grows old quickly. It is a good mystery but not a great one." Erin Bell of Gamezebo rated it 3/5 stars and wrote, "Alibi in Ashes should be praised for trying out some new gameplay ideas to shake up the formula, but in the end it's not as strong as some of the other games in the Nancy Drew series." Merlina McGovern of Adventure Gamers rated it 3.5/5 stars and wrote, "You won't see Nancy's home town through state-of-the art graphics, but Alibi in Ashes provides an entertaining window into the teen sleuth's personal life."

Preceded by Nancy Drew: The Captive Curse	Nancy Drew Computer Games	Succeeded by Nancy Drew: Tomb of the Lost Queen
