= Nancy Drew: The Phantom of Venice =

2008 video game

The Phantom of Venice
- Developer(s): Her Interactive
- Publisher(s): Her Interactive
- Platform(s): Microsoft Windows
- Release: NA: July 11, 2008
- Genre(s): Adventure
- Mode(s): Single-player

The Phantom of Venice is the 18th installment in the Nancy Drew point-and-click adventure game series by Her Interactive. The game is available for play on Microsoft Windows platforms. It has an ESRB rating of E for moments of mild violence and peril. Players take on the first-person view of fictional amateur sleuth Nancy Drew and must solve the mystery through interrogation of suspects, solving puzzles, and discovering clues. There are two levels of gameplay, Junior and Senior detective modes, each offering a different difficulty level of puzzles and hints, however neither of these changes affect the plot of the game. The game is loosely based on the 1985 book of the same name.

== Plot ==
The Italian secret police have called Nancy Drew in to investigate a series of art thefts happening in Venice. The thief has been dressing up in a mask and cape, and the news media have begun to call him "The Phantom" not only because of the way he dresses, but because he leaves behind so few clues. A crime syndicate is actually responsible for the thefts, using commedia dell'arte characters as code names. Nancy is sent to spy on the ring and discover the ringleader of the crimes.

== Development ==
=== Characters ===
- Nancy Drew - Nancy is an 18-year-old amateur detective from the fictional town of River Heights in the United States. She is the only playable character in the game, which means the player must solve the mystery from her perspective.
- Colin Baxter - Colin is an art restorer from Oxford, England. He is restoring the Ca' Nascosta for very little money, even though he's one of the best in his field. He claims to love art and works for near nothing because it is his passion. His job allows him to gain access to valuable artifacts - would he steal the treasures and sell them on the black market?
- Margherita Faubourg - Recently widowed, Margherita purchased the Ca' Nascosta to cement her status as a Venetian socialite. Her spending habits may have caused her to fall upon hard times. Would she do anything to stay in her circle of wealthy friends - including stealing and selling priceless artifacts?
- Helena Berg - Helena is a journalist from Austria who specializes in reporting high-profile crimes. Ambitious and calculating, Helena is extremely knowledgeable about the failures and successes of crime rings, but is she telling everything she knows, or does she have her own agenda?
- Enrico Tazza - Originally a guard for stolen goods, Enrico runs a private club called the Casa dei Giochi, but is it just a front for another crime ring? After all, he has the connections and the knowledge to steal the artifacts, so what's stopping him?
- Antonio Fango - The prime suspect in the case, Antonio installed wireless systems in the buildings where the priceless artifacts were stolen. Unfortunately, the authorities have no evidence against him. Is he committing crimes so perfectly that no clues are left behind?

=== Cast ===
- Nancy Drew - Lani Minella
- Helena Berg - Adrienne MacIain
- Colin Baxter - Jonah von Spreekin
- Margherita Faubourg - Gin Hammond
- Enrico Tazza - Bruce Milligan
- Ned Nickerson - Scott Carty
- Joe Hardy - Rob Jones
- Sophia Leporace - Angela Mills
- Prudence Rutherford - Simoune Choule
- Fausto / Romano the Singing Gondolier - Robert Riedl
- Angelo the Singing Gondolier - Andrew Parks
- Benito the Singing Gondolier - Bob Love
- Bruno the Singing Gondolier - Brandon K. Higa
- Raimondo the Singing Gondolier - Robert Scherzer
- Timoteo the Singing Gondolier - Tim Burke
- Italian Voices - Giuseppe Leporace, Vanja Skoric, Claudio Mazzola

Preceded by Nancy Drew: Legend of the Crystal Skull	Nancy Drew Computer Games	Succeeded by Nancy Drew: The Haunting of Castle Malloy
