= The Bike Tour Mystery =

Book in the Nancy Drew Mystery Stories series, by Carolyn Keene

The Bike Tour Mystery (2002), by Carolyn Keene, is the 168th volume in the now ended Nancy Drew Mystery Stories.

== Summary ==
When Nancy and her chums, Bess and George, sign up for a bicycle tour around Ireland they don't expect to be thrust into mystery mode. However, several of the other participants in the tour raise Nancy's suspicions: a dark character who lacks one pinky, an eager-beaver journalist, and two mysterious girls from Australia. Nancy unravels the truth about Rhonda and Rachel but finds herself in a race against time to save them from danger.

== Adaptation ==
The 19th installment in the Nancy Drew point-and-click adventure game series by Her Interactive, named Nancy Drew: The Haunting of Castle Malloy, is loosely based on the novel.
