= Nancy Drew: The Secret of Shadow Ranch =

2004 video game

- Developer: Her Interactive
- Publisher: DreamCatcher
- Composer: Kevin Manthei
- Series: Nancy Drew
- Platform: Microsoft Windows
- Release: NA: August 30, 2004
- Genre: Adventure
- Mode: Single player

The Secret of Shadow Ranch is the tenth installment in the Nancy Drew point-and-click adventure game series by Her Interactive. The game is available for play on Microsoft Windows platforms. It has an ESRB rating of E for moments of mild violence and peril. Players take on the first-person view of fictional amateur sleuth Nancy Drew and must solve the mystery through interrogation of suspects, solving puzzles, and discovering clues. There are two levels of gameplay, Junior and Senior detective modes, each offering a different difficulty level of puzzles and hints, however neither of these changes affect the actual plot of the game. The game is based on the book The Secret at Shadow Ranch (1965).

== Plot ==
Nancy Drew is invited by her best friends, Bess Marvin and George Fayne, to Shadow Ranch in Arizona for a vacation. On the first day there, Nancy discovers that the owners of the ranch, Bess and George's Uncle Ed and Aunt Bet Rawley, are gone. The previous evening, a glowing white horse came galloping up to the ranch, causing a huge commotion, and shortly after, Ed was bitten by a venomous rattlesnake and rushed to the hospital. Bess and George's flight has also been indefinitely delayed, so Nancy is alone at the ranch with Shorty, Dave, and Tex, the ranch's cook, foreman, and head wrangler, respectively.

In the 1880s, an outlaw named Dirk Valentine was romantically involved with the sheriff's daughter, Frances Humber, who lived at Shadow Ranch. Dirk had promised Frances a valuable treasure and left clues and puzzles around the area for her to find it, but he was subsequently arrested for bank robbery and hanged by Frances's father. Frances was too broken-hearted to search for the treasure, and in a fit of grief she ceased all contact with her father and permanently moved to the east coast. Local legend says that Dirk's horse has come back to avenge its master and that misfortune will befall whoever sets eyes on it.

Nancy spends the day helping the ranch hands with chores and exploring the area on one of Tex's horses, Bob. She meets Mary Yazzie, the owner of a local gift store who has a sour relationship with the Rawleys after they rejected her offer to buy a piece of their land. That evening, Nancy and the ranch hands are having a cookout when the "phantom" horse appears again, and suddenly a pipe explodes in the ranch's pump house.

The next day, Nancy finds out that Shorty has inquired with the local geological services about mineral deposits in the area in the hopes of striking it rich; Dave, whose great-aunt was Frances Humber's cousin, has been searching for Dirk Valentine's treasure; Tex's sister had previously worked for the Rawleys but was fired in a bitter dispute; and Mary Yazzie and Tex are secretly in a romantic relationship. She realizes one of the ranch hands or Mary could be sabotaging the ranch on purpose and blaming the incidents on Dirk Valentine's curse. Nancy searches for clues in the Dry Creek ghost town where Dirk had lived, and discovers that someone has been camping out in one of its abandoned buildings. That night, Nancy sees that her gloves are glowing just like the phantom horse, and realizes that she touched phosphorescent powder in the ghost town that someone must be using to make the horse glow. The phantom horse appears again, and the power lines to the ranch are disconnected.

The next day, while visiting the ghost town, Nancy is knocked unconscious by an unseen assailant and wakes up locked in an abandoned jail cell. She manages to escape, and after solving the rest of Dirk Valentine's puzzles, finds his treasure (a chest full of solid gold hearts) at the end of a maze inside a cliff dwelling. After leaving the room that holds the treasure she is confronted by Shorty, who has secretly followed her inside. Shorty admits that he and his friends purposely caused all of the incidents at the ranch in the hopes of scaring everyone away so they could look for the treasure, not realizing the treasure was not located on the ranch. After managing to trap Shorty, Nancy calls the sheriff to have him arrested and rides back to the ranch on the "phantom" horse that he had ridden to the cliff. Mary Yazzie reconciles with the Rawleys, Bess and George finally arrive at the ranch, and the three friends enjoy the rest of their vacation.

== Development ==
=== Characters ===
- Nancy Drew - Nancy is an 18-year-old amateur detective from the fictional town of River Heights in the United States. She is the only playable character in the game, which means the player must solve the mystery from her perspective.
- Dave Gregory - Dave is the ranch foreman. Always polite and very shy, Dave is a man of frustratingly few words who is mainly concerned with doing his job and doing it well. He grows very fond of Nancy over the course of the game.
- Tex Britten - Tex is the ranch's head wrangler. An old-fashioned cowpoke, his weathered face and cynical attitude reflect the fact that he feels much more at home with horses and cattle than with humans. He dislikes city folk, and enjoys putting Nancy in situations that he thinks she can't handle. He has a secret relationship with Mary Yazzie.
- Shorty Thurmond - The ranch cook, Shorty, is more talkative than the other two ranch hands combined. He loves to gossip and for that reason loves having Nancy around. He also loves to cook, despite doing it badly, and takes great pride in the food he serves. An admitted opportunist, he's always looking for ways to get rich quick, but has failed every time.
- Mary Yazzie - Mary is a Native American who runs a store on the land adjacent to Shadow Ranch. She knows all about the history of the area, especially as it pertains to the ancient Pueblo people who once inhabited the nearby cliff dwellings. She has repeatedly offered to purchase a portion of the Rawley's land, allegedly in search of petrified wood, but her offers have been continuously rejected. She has a secret relationship with Tex Britten.

=== Cast ===
- Nancy Drew - Lani Minella
- Bess Marvin / Frances Humber - Abby Murray
- George Fayne - Patty Pomplun
- Frank Hardy - Wayne Rawley
- Joe Hardy - Rob Jones
- Tex Britten - David S. Hogan
- Mary Yazzie - Amy Broomhall
- Shorty Thurmond / Mineral Map Guy / Radio Voice / Charleena's Assistant - Jonah Von Spreekin
- Dave Gregory - Stephen Hando
- Charleena Purcell / Radio Voice - Julie Rawley
- Bet Rawley - Shannon Kipp
- Ed Rawley - John Nelson
- Sheriff Hernandez / Radio Voice / Dirk Valentine - Gary Hoffman
- Meryl Humber - Max Holechek

== Nancy Drew Mobile Mysteries: Shadow Ranch ==
In early 2011, Her Interactive released an app called Shadow Ranch under their new sub-series of Nancy Drew games entitled Mobile Mysteries. Shadow Ranch is a story-based gamebook app with the book aspect of it as the actual text of the Shadow Ranch novel and the game aspect of it as mini-games within the story. The game shows the voices and screenshots of characters and locations from The Secret of Shadow Ranch PC game. Shadow Ranch is available only for the iPad, iPhone, and iPod Touch, priced at $2.99 for the iPad and $0.99 for the iPhone and iPod Touch.

== Reception ==
Reception

Review score
| Publication | Score |
|---|---|
| PC Magazine | 4/5 |

In the United States, Secret of the Shadow Ranch's computer version sold between 100,000 and 300,000 units by August 2006. By that date, the combined sales of Nancy Drew computer games had reached 2.1 million copies in the United States alone. Remarking upon this success, Edge called Nancy Drew a "powerful franchise".

| Preceded by Nancy Drew: Danger on Deception Island | Nancy Drew Computer Games | Succeeded by Nancy Drew: Curse of Blackmoor Manor |
