= Nancy Drew: Tomb of the Lost Queen =

2012 video game

Tomb of the Lost Queen
- Developer: Her Interactive
- Publisher: Her Interactive
- Platforms: Microsoft Windows; Mac OS X
- Release: May 8, 2012
- Genre: Adventure
- Mode: Single-player

Tomb of the Lost Queen is the 26th installment in the Nancy Drew point-and-click adventure game series by Her Interactive. The game is available on Microsoft Windows and Mac OS X platforms. It has an ESRB rating of E for moments of mild violence. Players take on the first-person view of fictional amateur sleuth Nancy Drew and must solve the mystery through interrogation of suspects, solving puzzles, and discovering clues. There are two levels of gameplay, Amateur and Master sleuth modes, each offering a different difficulty level of puzzles and hints, however neither of these changes affect the plot of the game. The game is loosely based on the book Secrets of the Nile (1995).

== Plot ==
60 years ago, a violent sandstorm uncovered an ancient tomb in the desert outside Cairo, Egypt. A British expedition set off to find Egypt's legendary Lost Queen, Nefertari. The expedition never returned. The explorers were lost and presumed dead. In the present day, Nancy Drew joins leading archaeologists as they unearth what they presume to be the tomb where the British explorers were lost. The site is rumored to be cursed due to an increase in suspicious accidents. The site's lead archaeologist, Professor Jon Boyle, was attacked during a fierce sandstorm and sent to the hospital to recover. As an amateur detective, Nancy steps in to find who attacked Professor Boyle and to investigate the events of the previous expedition.

== Development ==
=== Characters ===
- Nancy Drew - Nancy is an 18-year-old amateur detective from the fictional town of River Heights in the United States. She is the only playable character in the game, which means the player must solve the mystery from her perspective.
- Abdullah Bakhoum - Abdullah is the Egyptian-assigned liaison to the Kingston dig team. He's famous in the Egyptology world for both his discoveries and his strong personality. Though he's tried for years, he hasn't yet been able to attain a high-ranking position in the field and is determined to get what he wants. Could his passion for discovery and the need for the limelight be the fuel behind the strange accidents?
- Lily Crewe - Lily is an Egyptology PhD student from Kingston University on her first expedition. Archaeology is her passion and she's beyond thrilled to be part of this dig. She wants to find the mummy but she has no clue on what she could be doing at the expedition. She is also in awe of Abdullah and petrified of displeasing him. Her desire for leadership and clear inexperience make her look suspicious.
- Jamila El-Dine - Jamila is a local Egyptian who was thrilled when the temple was discovered just outside her town. She loves ancient Egypt and is a firm believer that the aliens built the pyramids. Jamila spends much of her time sneaking around in the shadows. Her presence in the expedition and her beliefs about the situation at hand are suspicious.
- Dylan Carter - British tour guide Dylan is charismatic, knowledgeable, and friendly. He's also crashing a dig site. Carter claims that tourists will come to the tomb when they hear about the curse, which might imply that he is betting his financial future on more misfortune for the team. If Carter can't bank on a natural accident, would he go to the trouble of creating one?

=== Cast ===
- Nancy Drew - Lani Minella
- Abdullah Bakhoum - Dave Rivas
- Lily Crewe - Marianna DeFazio
- Dylan Carter - Gabriel Wolf
- Jamila El-Dine - Sofia Rybin
- Jon Boyle - Mark Waldstein
- Professor Beatrice Hotchkiss - Keri Healey
- Bess Marvin - Jennifer Pratt
- Miscellaneous voices - Bill Corkery

Preceded by Nancy Drew: Alibi in Ashes	Nancy Drew Computer Games	Succeeded by Nancy Drew: The Deadly Device
