= Nancy Drew: The White Wolf of Icicle Creek =

2007 video game

Nancy Drew: White Wolf of Icicle Creek
- Developer: Her Interactive
- Publishers: Her Interactive; Sega (Wii)
- Platforms: Wii, Windows
- Release: NA: June 7, 2007 (Win); NA: December 2, 2008 (Wii)
- Genre: Adventure
- Mode: Single player

The White Wolf of Icicle Creek is the 16th installment in the Nancy Drew point-and-click adventure game series by Her Interactive and by Sega for the Wii. It is available to play on Microsoft Windows platforms and Wii. Players take on the first-person view of a fictional amateur sleuth, Nancy Drew, and must solve a mystery by interrogating suspects, solving puzzles, and discovering clues. The game is loosely based on the book The Mystery of the Mother Wolf (2002).

The game was originally released in June 2007 for Windows and was ported to the Wii in December 2008. The latter incorporated the Wii's unique control scheme into the gameplay and mini-games. It is rated E by ESRB, and contains moments of mild violence and references to alcoholic beverages.

== Plot ==
Nancy Drew travels to Alberta, Canada to stay at the Icicle Creek Lodge when Chantal Moique, the owner of the lodge, asks her to investigate a recent string of suspicious accidents that have occurred there. The same white gray wolf has appeared at the scene of each accident and disappears when the police arrive. As Nancy arrives at the lodge, an explosion destroys the bunkhouse and a wolf howl is heard ominously in the distance. Nancy goes undercover as the new maid and cooks at the lodge to investigate without appearing suspicious. She is tasked with finding the culprit before the remaining guests leave and the reputation of the lodge is destroyed.

=== Characters ===
- Nancy Drew - An 18-year-old amateur detective from the fictional town of River Heights in the United States. The player must solve the mystery from her perspective.
- Ollie Randall - The lodge handyman. He is tired of the wolf disrupting his day and terrorizing guests. He is gruff and believes that killing the wolf and mounting it on the wall will solve all of the Lodge's problems.
- Freddie Randall - Ollie's daughter. She spends all day playing "Snow Princess" in her ice fort and challenging anyone who passes by to a snowball fight.
- Yanni Volkstaia - An Olympic cross-country skier from the fictional country of Fredonia. He believes his competitors are spying on him and are trying to rattle his nerves by causing the accidents at the Lodge.
- Guadalupe "Lupe" Comillo - A birdwatcher from Los Angeles. She knows very little about birds, but plenty about wolves. Guadalupe arrived at the lodge just as the trouble with the wolf started, but she had not been frightened away yet.
- Bill Kessler - An avid ice fisherman who spends his days catching Northern Pikes at the lodge. The wolf has put a damper on Bill's trip and he wants it destroyed, even if it means destroying Icicle Creek Lodge.
- Lou Talbot - An art student from California who has come to the lodge to snowshoe. He doesn't believe the wolf has anything to do with the accidents.

=== Cast ===
- Nancy Drew / Freddie - Lani Minella
- Ollie Randall - Mark Shone
- Chantal Moique - Kate Jaeger
- Bill Kessler - Jonah Von Spreekin
- Lou Talbot - Gabriel Baron
- Yanni Volkstaia - Evan Newton
- Guadalupe Comillo - Kate Wisniewski
- Sheriff Mahihkan / Additional Voices - Keith Dahlgren
- Ned Nickerson - Scott Carty
- Tino Balducci - Jeff Minnerly
- Nikki Sabatini / Additional Voices - Amy Broomhall
- Additional Voices - Brian Neel
- White Wolf - Tony Bradshaw

== Gameplay ==
The game features two game modes (Junior and Senior detective), each offering a different difficulty level of puzzles and hints without affecting the actual plot.

== Reception ==
Nancy Drew: The White Wolf of Icicle Creek
PC and Wii review scores

Aggregate scores
Aggregator	Score
GameRankings	74.83% (PC); 66.70% (Wii)
Metacritic	73/100 (PC); 67/100 (Wii)

Review scores
Publication	Score
Adventure Gamers	3.5/5 (PC)
IGN	7.5/10 (Wii)

Reception to the game ranged from mixed to positive, with the story being praised though some criticized puzzles and pacing.

Preceded by Nancy Drew: The Creature of Kapu Cave	Nancy Drew Computer Games	Succeeded by Nancy Drew: Legend of the Crystal Skull
