= Nancy Drew: Legend of the Crystal Skull =

2007 video game

- Developer(s): Her Interactive
- Publisher(s): Her Interactive
- Engine: Her Interactive
- Platform(s): Microsoft Windows
- Release: NA: October 8, 2007
- Genre(s): Adventure
- Mode(s): Single player

Nancy Drew: Legend of the Crystal Skull is the 17th installment in the Nancy Drew point-and-click adventure game series by Her Interactive. It is available for play on Microsoft Windows platforms. It has an ESRB rating of E for moments of mild violence and peril. Players take on the first-person view of fictional amateur sleuth Nancy Drew and must solve the mystery through interrogation of suspects, solving puzzles, and discovering clues. There are two levels of gameplay, Junior and Senior detective modes, each offering a different difficulty level of puzzles and hints, however neither of these changes affect the plot of the game. The game is loosely based on the book The Mardi Gras Mystery (1988).

== Plot ==
Nancy Drew goes on vacation to New Orleans with her best friend, Bess Marvin. As a favor, she stops to check in on Ned Nickerson's friend, Henry Bolet. Henry's last living family member, his Great Uncle Bruno, recently died and left him responsible for settling the estate. As soon as Nancy arrives, she is knocked out by someone wearing a skeleton costume, and she soon discovers that Bruno was the proud owner of the "Whisperer", a crystal skull rumored to protect its holder from almost any cause of death except murder. When Bruno died, it was not found among the clutter of the Bolet manor. Nancy teams up with Bess to find the mystical artifact before it falls into the wrong hands.

== Development ==
=== Characters ===
- Nancy Drew - Nancy is an 18-year-old amateur detective from the fictional town of River Heights in the United States. She is the main playable character in the game, and the player solves portions of the mystery from her perspective.
- Bess Marvin – Bess is one of Nancy's best friends. She has always been helping Nancy solve mysteries. However, Bess's intentions for the trip were to relax in the sun. Instead, she winds up working with Nancy. Bess is also a playable character, and the player solves portions of the mystery from her perspective.
- Henry Bolet – Henry's parents died while he was young, and he was sent to live with his Great Uncle Bruno. Bruno never spent much time with Henry but left him a sizable portion of his estate. Emotional and cunning, he might have schemed to control his last living relative's assets and secrets.
- Renée Amande/Armande – Renée was Bruno Bolet's housekeeper. Since she spent so much time in his presence, she knows a lot of his secrets - dark secrets that he did not want anyone to know, but others would have killed to discover. She might have resorted to murder to possess the mystical skull.
- Lamont Warrick – Lamont is the proud owner of Zeke's, a colorful curio shop full of unusual and eclectic merchandise. He is always looking for treasure among other people's junk. He likes to procure precious items, authentic antiques, and priceless pieces. The crystal skull would be very attractive to him.
- Dr. Gilbert Buford – Dr. Buford found the unconscious body of his friend, Bruno Bolet, and declared that no autopsy was necessary. As Bruno's confidant, he knew that Bruno owned a mystical artifact that he believed gave him immortality. He might have wanted the crystal skull to escape his own death.

=== Cast ===
- Nancy Drew - Lani Minella
- Bess Marvin - Jennifer Pratt
- Ned Nickerson - Scott Carty
- Lamont Warrick - Jason Sharp
- Gilbert Buford - Keith Dahlgren
- Renée Amande - Walayn Sharples
- Henry Bolet - Brian Neel
- Professor Beatrice Hotchkiss - Keri Healey
- Authenticator/Additional Voices - Scot Kirk
- Additional Voices - Leslie Wadsworth

== Critical reception ==
IGN awarded 7.5 out of 10, highlighting the detailed environments, well-modeled characters and good voice acting, with interesting but hard puzzles. However, the movement system (clicking on arrows) and jerky turning animation was criticized, and it was not rated highly for lasting appeal. Commonsensemedia gave it a rating of 5/5, deeming it a fulfilling mystery. Gameboomers recommended the game, though criticized its difficult button mashing mini-game. Adventure Gaming Magazine thought it was a bit of a letdown to its predecessors in the series, which featured "cleverly themed puzzles, captivating soundtracks, and fun characters". Gamezone thought it was one of the better games in the series, and praised it for encouraging cooperative play. Adventure Gamers said it was "arguably the best game in the series".

Preceded by Nancy Drew: The White Wolf of Icicle Creek	Nancy Drew Computer Games	Succeeded by Nancy Drew: The Phantom of Venice
