= Nancy Drew Dossier: Lights, Camera, Curses =

2008 video game

- Developer: Her Interactive
- Publishers: Big Fish Games (online); Her Interactive
- Platform: Microsoft Windows
- Release: November 11, 2008: NA: May 5, 2009
- Genre: Puzzle
- Mode: Single-player

Nancy Drew Dossier: Lights, Camera, Curses! is the first installment in the Nancy Drew hidden object game series by Her Interactive. The game is available for play on Microsoft Windows platforms. It has an ESRB rating of E for moments of mild violence and tobacco references. Players take on the first-person view of fictional amateur sleuth Nancy Drew and must solve the mystery through interrogation of suspects, solving puzzles, and discovering clues.

== Plot ==
Nancy Drew is on the set of a controversial remake of the famous 1930s film “Pharaoh!” The original movie was released with an alternate ending due to the untimely death of Lois Manson, the film's star, and became a box office smash. Now, Nancy Drew is undercover on the set to get to the bottom of suspicious press leaks and uncanny accidents that have the production schedule in jeopardy. Is someone trying to sabotage the movie or is it a curse of the fallen film star?

== Development ==
=== Characters ===
Molly McKenna: Molly McKenna is the hard-nosed producer "Pharaoh!" She is a modern, high-tech multi-tasker who likes others to believe she's in complete control. But with production falling into chaos, could she hate the director enough to ensure he never makes another movie?
Arthur Hitchens: Arthur Hitchens is the financier for "Pharaoh!" and plans on releasing the epic feature along with the original 'director's cut' and a new theme park. With all the disasters, he has smartly taken out insurance for the movie and is receiving money for the damages, but was this all part of the plan?
Eda Brooks: Eda Brooks is an up-and-coming actress who might be a mega-star if she pulls off her first starring role. Eda is quite a talent and will make a stunning Nefertiti. But, is she saving her best performance for the big screen or sabotaging the set so it will gain more publicity?
Jorge Jackson: Jorge Jackson is the newest, flashiest, big blockbuster director. No one seems to like his vision for the movie and he feels under-appreciated. Would he go so far as to sabotage his movie so he can get his revenge on everyone for "ruining" his movie?

=== Cast ===
- Nancy Drew - Lani Minella

Preceded by None	Nancy Drew Dossier Computer Games	Succeeded by Resorting to Danger
