= Nancy Drew: The Shattered Medallion =

2014 video game

- Developer: Her Interactive
- Publisher: Her Interactive
- Platforms: Microsoft Windows; Mac OS X
- Release: NA: May 20, 2014
- Genre: Adventure
- Mode: Single-player

The Shattered Medallion is the 30th installment in the Nancy Drew point-and-click adventure game series by Her Interactive. The game is available for play on Microsoft Windows and Mac OS X platforms. It has an ESRB rating of E for moments of mild violence. Players take on the first-person view of fictional amateur sleuth Nancy Drew and must solve the mystery through interrogation of suspects, solving puzzles, and discovering clues. There are two levels of gameplay, Amateur and Master sleuth modes, each offering a different difficulty level of puzzles and hints, however neither of these changes affect the plot of the game. The game is loosely based on the book Real Fake (2007).

== Plot ==
Nancy Drew and her friend George Fayne end up winning a spot on a reality television show in New Zealand called Pacific Run, in which the contestants complete physical challenges to get five pieces of a medallion. The eccentric Sonny Joon has hijacked production of the show, which is spiraling out of control as certain contestants are being favored and dangerous missions are being assigned. While competing in a challenge, George is seriously injured and Nancy's other friend Bess Marvin must step in to take her place. Nancy, George, and Bess must investigate the incident that caused George's injury as well as why Sonny took charge of the show and what he really plans to do with it.

== Development ==
=== Characters ===
- Nancy Drew (Lani Minella) – Nancy is an 18-year-old amateur detective from the fictional town of River Heights in the United States. She is the only playable character in the game, which means the player must solve the mystery from her perspective.
- George Fayne (Sofia Rybin) – Nancy's sporty, competitive best friend and Bess's cousin. She is Nancy's teammate on Pacific Run. She is excited to share upcoming challenges as a member of Team Tui.
- Bess Marvin (Jennifer Pratt) – Nancy's feminine, laid back best friend and George's cousin. Although she is not officially on Team Tui as a contestant, she has come along to support and encourage Nancy and George on this adventure.
- Kiri Nind (Shiromi Arserio) – Team Tawaki's Kiri Nind is an intense competitor, but she seems to be an old pro when it comes to reality television. She has a reputation for being brutal, but she does seem to understand that the competition is just a game. Off camera she seems nice and may be willing to forge an alliance with Nancy.
- Patrick Dowsett (Beau Prichard) – This former rugby star player has the athletic ability to bring his team to an easy victory, but his head is not in the game.
- Leena Patel (Kira Lauren) – Leena Patel, the other member of Team Kea, is a bossy overachiever. She is smart and skilled in solving puzzles, and is a stickler for the rules.
- Sonny Joon (Jamal Fahim) – After years of following his trail, Nancy Drew finally gets to meet Sonny Joon! As part of Pacific Run’s production team, he can influence the show results. His quirky personality may be hiding mischievous goals.

Additional voice work was performed by Carol King and Leilani Berinobis.

Preceded by Nancy Drew: The Silent Spy	Nancy Drew Computer Games	Succeeded by Nancy Drew: Labyrinth of Lies
