= Nancy Drew Dossier: Resorting to Danger =

2009 video game

Resorting to Danger
- Developer: Her Interactive
- Publisher: Her Interactive
- Platform: Microsoft Windows
- Release: NA: August 25, 2009
- Genre: Adventure
- Mode: Single-player

Nancy Drew Dossier: Resorting to Danger is a hidden object game PC game, developed and published by Her Interactive. In the game, detective Nancy Drew is sent to the Redondo Centre for Rejuvenation to determine who has been setting a series of non-lethal but damage-causing bombs around the resort. The player must complete a series of mini-games, including hidden-object challenges, matching games, and puzzles, as well as performing tasks around the resort and interrogating guests. The game features six possible endings, depending on the player's answers to questions earlier in the game.

The game was released in the United States on August 25, 2009, and on June 11, 2010, in France, as the second entry in the Nancy Drew Dossier series. It received generally favorable reviews from critics, who praised most of the mini-games as well as the release's conciseness, although some voiced criticism of individual mini-games.

== Plot ==
The game takes place at the Redondo Centre for Rejuvenation, a luxury spa where an unknown person has been detonating a series of bombs. Although the bombs aren't so far deadly, and the manager has successfully covered up the news to avoid scaring off guests, they do release messy materials, and he worries that guests will soon be scared off. He calls in Drew to investigate the bombings while posing as the new spa assistant. To solve the mystery, Drew must explore the resort's various rooms, including guest rooms, while also performing spa-related tasks. Settings within the spa include a "Jungle Room" for mud baths, a "Zen Room" with oriental furnishings, the reception area, the basement, and a bedroom suite.

== Gameplay ==
In contrast to most of Her Interactive's Nancy Drew game titles, Resorting to Danger is designed to be more casual and faster to complete. IGN estimates that the game takes six hours to play, while Adventure Gamers reports the game length as between five and six hours. There are 32 levels and six possible endings, with the culprit changing depending on which guest the player suspects, although most other aspects of the game aren't randomized. The player receives points based on the speed and accuracy with which the mini-games are completed; a sufficient number of points earns the "Ultimate Private Eye" rating, which unlocks exclusive art and bloopers during the credits. Upon completing the game, players also unlock an "Arcade" mode where they can replay most of the mini-games. The game does not have an option for manual saving, so players don't have the option of replaying levels without restarting.

Although it was promoted as a hidden object game, a title some players agreed with, others argued that it would be more appropriately classified as an adventure game, due to its mechanics and the prevalence of non-hidden object puzzles. To explore the spa and use items, the player clicks on various objects and pairs them with each other or with one of several action options, such as "pull", "twist", "shake", or "scratch". In order to progress through the story, the player must complete a series of puzzles and mini-games based on various tasks around the resort, such as answering the telephone and performing facial treatments using creams, mud, and fruits on guests' faces in the correct order. A majority of the puzzles involve "find a pair"-style mechanics in which the player must place items where they belong. Other puzzles are jigsaws or require the player to disarm a bomb by rearranging circuits. In one recurring mini-game, the player must rotate three-colored balls so that the colors match. Two mini-games require the player to navigate Drew through the resort's garden maze. The latter garden-centered game requires the player to match items with statues based on Greek history and mythology. In two "bonus" games, not required for progression but offering the chance to score bonus points, players must catch rats and cockroaches as they run across the screen.

== Development ==
=== Characters ===
- Nancy Drew - Nancy is an eighteen-year-old amateur detective from the fictional town of River Heights in the United States. She is the only playable character in the game, which means the player must solve the mystery from her perspective.
- Cassidy Jones: Cassidy Jones is the receptionist at the Redondo. He strongly dislikes the job, and it is starting to show in his work. But why would a highly intelligent graduate from Brown University take a job as a receptionist unless he has other motives?
- Nick Bleski: There's nothing Nick Bleski won't do for money. Which is perfect, considering that his job as the general manager of the Redondo demands that he make as much money as possible. Is he planting these innocuous bombs so he can claim insurance and bolster his bottom line?
- Mrs. Montague: As one of the Redondo's wealthiest clients, Mrs. Montague always gets what she wants. When the spa denies one of her demands, would she go so far as to set off bombs to get her revenge?
- Helfdan Helgason: Helfdan Helgason is a genius, who creates exclusive cosmetic salves, creams, and liquids for the Redondo. If this scientist is creating revolutionary products that virtually erase all signs of aging, then why is he still stuck at the spa?
- Jasmine Ivy: Jasmine Ivy is a well respected actress who plays the Hollywood 'game' and stops by the Redondo to 'rejuvenate' her looks. Naturally, she wouldn't want anyone to know about her treatments, but would she set off bombs in the spa to keep them from talking?
- Joanna Brown: The Redondo keeps the janitor, Joanna Brown, who lives in the furnace room with her pet rats, shuttered away safely during the day from their clients. Is Joanna resentful of the spa's treatment and setting off bombs that won't damage her home but will destroy the spa's reputation?

=== Cast ===
- Nancy Drew / Garden Gossiper - Lani Minella
- Helfdan Helgason / Cassidy Jones / Switchboard Caller - Mark Waldstein
- Nick Bleski / Switchboard Caller - Matt Shimkus
- Mrs. Montague / Garden Gossiper / Switchboard Caller - Samara Lerman
- Joanna Brown / Garden Gossiper / Switchboard Caller - Amy Broomhall
- Jasmine Ivy / Garden Gossiper / Switchboard Caller - Adrienne MacIain
- Switchboard Caller - Brandon Vaughan

== Release ==
Reception

Aggregate score
Aggregator	Score
Metacritic	77/100

Review scores
Publication	Score
Adventure Gamers	4/5
Gamekult	3/10
GameZone	8/10

The game was released by Her Interactive for PC on August 25, 2009. It was added to the Steam webstore on November 19, 2009. With its release, it marked the second game in the Dossier series, following the previous year's Lights, Cameras, Curses. A French edition of the game was released on June 11, 2010, under the name Beauté sous Tension ("Beauty under Pressure"). The game holds an ESRB rating of E10+ for mild violence, particularly in the animated cut scenes and some threatening dialogue.

Upon its release, the game drew generally favorable reviews from professional critics. Anise Hollingshead, writing for GameZone, praised the mini-games as more developed and integrated into the story than those of Lights, Camera, Curses, though opined that the dialog choices in conversations with guests were too obvious and pointless. Hollingshead gave the game an overall score of eight out of ten and declared that "Everyone in the family can have a good time at the Redondo Spa!" A review by Ryan Casey for Just Adventure commended the game's plot and the mini-games' difficulty level, giving the game a letter grade of "A" and deeming it better than some of the non-Dossier Nancy Drew games. In its review of the French edition, Gamekult praised the game's appearance and some of its many mini-games, but criticized many of the others as uninteresting, and also deemed the game too easy and its length too short; the website ultimately awarded the game a score of three out of ten, meaning "bad". A review for My Gamer praised most of the mini-games as well as the length and arcade mode, but also argued that the game featured excessive dialogue, and criticized the Greek mythology garden mini-game for being time-consuming and requiring excessive outside knowledge. Common Sense Media awarded the game four stars out of five, praising the mini-games as fun if not innovative, and the hidden object challenges as more complex than those found in other games.

Preceded by Lights, Camera, Curses	Nancy Drew Dossier Computer Games	Succeeded by None
