= The Twin Dilemma (novel) =

1981 novel by Carolyn Keene

Nancy Drew: The Twin Dilemma
- First edition
- Author: Carolyn Keene
- Illustrator: Paul Frame
- Cover artist: Ruth Sanderson
- Language: English
- Series: Nancy Drew Mystery Stories
- Genre: Detective, mystery novel
- Publisher: Wanderer Books
- Publication date: 11 November 1981
- Publication place: United States
- Pages: 190
- ISBN: 9780590326926
- Preceded by: The Kachina Doll Mystery
- Followed by: Captive Witness

The Twin Dilemma is the 63rd volume in the Nancy Drew Mystery Stories series. It was first published by Wanderer Books in 1981 under the author's pseudonym Carolyn Keene. It was written by Nancy Axelrad.
