= Nancy Drew: Danger by Design =

2006 video game

Nancy Drew: Danger By Design
- Developer: Her Interactive
- Publisher: DreamCatcher
- Platform: Microsoft Windows
- Release: NA: July 24, 2006
- Genre: Adventure
- Mode: Single player

Danger by Design is the 14th installment in the Nancy Drew point-and-click adventure game series by Her Interactive. The game is available for play on Microsoft Windows platforms. It has an ESRB rating of E for moments of mild violence and peril. Players take on the first-person view of fictional amateur sleuth Nancy Drew and must solve the mystery through interrogation of suspects, solving puzzles, and discovering clues. There are two levels of gameplay, Junior and Senior detective modes, each offering a different difficulty level of puzzles and hints, however neither of these changes affect the plot of the game. The game is loosely based on the book Death by Design (1988).

== Plot ==
Nancy Drew travels to Paris, France to work undercover as an assistant to Minette, an up-and-coming couture fashion designer who has lately been acting bizarre and erratic. Minette has been throwing temper tantrums and firing her employees without cause, is dangerously behind schedule, and refuses to be seen without a mask covering her whole face. Nancy is tasked with uncovering the reasons behind Minette's strange behavior.

When Nancy arrives in Paris at the moulin where Minette's studio is located, she finds Minette screaming at her other assistant, a young aspiring fashion designer named Heather McKay. Heather later explains to Nancy that Minette has been commissioned to design a dress for the First Lady of France to wear to the upcoming World Summit.

Nancy performs various chores and errands for Minette, and travels around Paris to meet some of her associates: Jing Jing "JJ" Ling, an Australian model who serves as a living fitting model for Minette's dresses; Dieter von Schwesterkrank, a fashion photographer who used to be romantically involved with Minette; and Jean-Michel Traquenard, a local fashion magazine editor.

Shortly after Nancy arrives, she intercepts an anonymous letter that threatens Minette's life. Heather explains that the letters, along with equally threatening phone calls and deliveries of dead flowers, have been going on for months. Nancy also learns that JJ was tricked into her current contract with Minette; Dieter is still bitter and confused about Minette suddenly ending their relationship; Jean-Michel recently wrote a feature on Minette that focused mainly on her mysterious mask; and Heather is hoping to soon cut ties with Minette and become an independent fashion designer.

While running an errand for Minette, Nancy runs into Dieter; he refuses to acknowledge her and runs away, leaving behind a newspaper clipping of an obituary for a woman named Noisette Tornade. Noisette, who was the previous owner of the moulin that is now Minette's studio, was a translator for the Germans during World War II who secretly moonlighted as a coder for the French Resistance. After talking to a local historian, Nancy learns that Noisette Tornade was romantically involved with Dieter's late great-uncle, Hans von Schwesterkrank.

Nancy finds evidence that Heather wrote at least one of the threatening letters to Minette. When Nancy confronts Heather, she admits to writing one letter in a fit of jealousy because she has a crush on Dieter, whom Minette was dating at the time. (Note: The game allows the player to choose whether or not Nancy tells Minette about Heather's letter. Choosing to tell Minette will result in Heather getting fired and being absent for the remainder of the game.)

Dieter later tells Nancy that he initially only dated Minette in an attempt to gain more information on Noisette Tornade, but unexpectedly fell in love with her in the process. Later, someone places a bomb on the door to Minette's studio, and Nancy must defuse it before Minette opens the door.

Nancy follows clues and solves puzzles, including exploring the Parisian catacombs and using a decoding machine from WWII, before finding a secret room underneath the moulin that is home to stained-glass art pieces stolen and hidden by Noisette Tornade during the war. From this room, Nancy overhears Minette discussing with two accomplices her plan to bug the dress she is designing for the First Lady so they can spy on her during the World Summit. The accomplices have been sending the threats, with Minette's knowledge, and are planning to pay Minette a handsome sum of money for the dress. When Nancy tries to get the dress so she can take it to the police, she is intercepted by Minette, whom she must defeat in a martial arts fight. After Minette is defeated, her mask falls off, revealing a tattoo of an alien on her cheek. The stained-glass art pieces are returned to their churches with Noisette getting the recognition as a hero for saving them, Minette and her accomplices are arrested, and Heather takes over Minette's spring show. (Note: If the player has opted to tell Minette about Heather's threatening letter, resulting in Heather getting fired, Nancy writes that she was not invited to the show. If not, Nancy writes that Heather asked her to walk the runway in the show.)

== Development ==
=== Characters ===
- Nancy Drew - Nancy is an 18-year-old amateur detective from the fictional town of River Heights in the United States. She is the only playable character in the game, which means the player must solve the mystery from her perspective.
- Minette - Minette donned a mask at the end of her fall show and hasn't taken it off since. Lately, as her deadlines loom closer, she has been acting strangely, throwing temper tantrums and firing her employees. Minette is socially inept, high-strung, and temperamental, but above all, she is talented. Recently, Minette has been receiving threatening notes from an anonymous writer.
- Heather McKay - Heather is Minette's friendly assistant, and she has lasted far longer than any of the assistants before her. She dreams of making it big in the fashion world but is staying on with Minette in hopes of gaining some contacts and experience. Heather has a major crush on Dieter, but he doesn't share her feelings.
- Dieter von Schwesterkrank - Dieter is an enterprising, arrogant, and ambitious young photographer. He once dated Minette, but she broke it off, leaving him heartbroken and humiliated. Dieter tends to keep to himself and dislikes almost everyone else in the fashion industry. He obsessively searches for his great-uncle's long lost treasure.
- Jing Jing Ling - Jing Jing, better known as JJ, is Minette's fitting model. Minette requires her to be a size 12, so she is constantly eating chocolate chip cookies. Although she is down-to-earth, bubbly, and outgoing, JJ is bitter after being tricked into signing her current contract with Minette, forcing her to stay in Paris much longer than she originally anticipated.
- Jean Michel Traquenard - Jean Mi is a columnist for GlamGlam magazine and a critical voice when it comes to fashion. Most people are terrified that he will write something bad about them, so they bow and scrape in his presence. As far as Jean Mi is concerned, whatever he wants, he will get. He is well known for being conceited.

=== Cast ===
- Nancy Drew - Lani Minella
- Jing Jing Ling - Amy Broomhall
- Heather McKay / Monique - Megan Hill
- Minette / Malika - Shawnmarie Yates
- Jean-Michel Traquenard - Guy Nelson
- Dieter von Schwesterkrank / Zu / Ernst Schmeck - Stephen Hando
- Lynn Manrique - Dana Cali
- Hugo Butterly / Monsieur Marchand / Gunther Schmeck - Tim Moore
- Prudence Rutherford - Simone Choule
- Bess Marvin - Alisa Murray
- George Fayne - Patty Pomplun
- Frank Hardy - Jonah Von Spreekin
- Joe Hardy - Rob Jones
- Waiter / Police - Mathias Jangla

== Reception ==
Charles Herold of The New York Times wrote, "The game itself is decent over all, though hardly the best in the series, but the ending is anticlimactic."

Preceded by Nancy Drew: Last Train to Blue Moon Canyon	Nancy Drew Computer Games	Succeeded by Nancy Drew: The Creature of Kapu Cave
