= Nancy Drew: Labyrinth of Lies =

2014 video game

- Developer: Her Interactive
- Publisher: Her Interactive
- Platforms: Microsoft Windows; Mac OS X
- Release: October 14, 2014
- Genre: Adventure
- Mode: Single-player

Labyrinth of Lies is the 31st installment in the Nancy Drew point-and-click adventure game series by Her Interactive. The game is available on Microsoft Windows and Mac OS X platforms. It has an ESRB rating of E10+ for moments of mild violence. Players take on the first-person view of fictional amateur sleuth Nancy Drew and must solve the mystery through interrogation of suspects, solving puzzles, and discovering clues. There are two levels of gameplay, Amateur and Master sleuth modes, each offering a different difficulty level of puzzles and hints, however, neither of these changes affect the plot of the game. This game is loosely based upon the book The Greek Symbol Mystery.

== Plot ==
Nancy Drew travels to Greece to assist Melina Rosi, the curator of the Phidias Cultural Center, with its new exhibit on Greek antiquities. A stage troupe is rehearsing Persephone in Winter, a play about the myth of Persephone, to be performed at the museum to increase publicity for the new exhibit.

Nancy meets Xenia Doukas, who is directing and starring as Persephone in the play; Grigor Karakinos, who plays Hermes and serves as the stage technician; and Thanos Ganas, who plays Hades and controls the underground sets. When Nancy enters the museum for the first time, she witnesses Niobe Papadaki, who plays Demeter and is doing all the art for the show, break the glass on one of the exhibits while freehand tracing it. Niobe says she is extremely nervous about the show and tells Nancy she should leave.

Melina calls Nancy and tells her that some of the jewelry pieces for the new exhibit have failed to arrive at the museum despite being listed on the shipping invoice. She suspects the pieces may have been stolen, and although the four players were interviewed, searched, and cleared by the police, Melina is not certain they are all innocent. Nancy agrees to help investigate.

Nancy asks the Hardy Boys to research the backgrounds of each of the actors. She learns that Xenia appears to be who she says she is, but Grigor is actually an American who was orphaned as a child and has now assumed a new identity in Greece; Niobe is an accomplished artist who has exhibited at the Met but was discredited after being accused of forgery; and Thanos was directly involved in a fatal shooting while working in private security.

Nancy discovers that some of the pieces in place for the exhibit cannot be properly verified as authentic. She also learns that Melina asked Niobe to make copies of the exhibit pieces to use as props in the play in order to promote the museum. Niobe is contractually obligated to ensure the copied pieces are not too similar to the originals, but Nancy finds evidence that she is breaking her contract by making pieces that are identical. Meanwhile, Nancy finds a mysterious list of people in a hidden compartment in Grigor's bag; the Hardy Boys find out that these people are wealthy art collectors, and also that Thanos works for the Greek organized crime syndicate Kronos and is considered dangerous.

Nancy hypothesizes that the actors are stealing the exhibit pieces and replacing them with forged copies. She confronts Niobe, who admits she is making copies but claims they are only for herself, to satisfy unresolved feelings related to the downfall of her career. She was caught trying to help a friend by signing the friend's name on Niobe's own paintings, and her career was destroyed. Nancy witnesses Grigor going down the lift with one of the stolen pieces; she confronts him, and he does not deny the accusations, instead telling Nancy to leave.

Niobe confesses to Nancy that she is making forgeries to swap out with the real pieces in the play, but says she is only doing so because Thanos is forcing her hand. She tries to help Nancy stop the crime, but Nancy is knocked unconscious by Thanos, who locks her in a cage in one of the underground sets. Grigor finds Nancy in the cage and refuses to free her, but says that he is also being forced into the scheme by Thanos after having been lured by the promise of money. Nancy frees herself and manages to lock Thanos in that same cage, although he escapes shortly thereafter.

While making her way through the underground sets, Nancy is again knocked unconscious, this time by a set piece. She wakes up in another set room and is greeted by Xenia, who admits that she is the mastermind behind the art heist, and that everyone including Thanos has been following her directive. Nancy escapes from the underground and, emerging onto the stage in the middle of the performance, stops the play and tells the audience about the actors' plan. All four actors are arrested: Xenia is revealed to have been a longtime art thief; Thanos escapes from jail due to his connections in the local police force; Grigor is optimistic that a plea bargain will reduce his sentence; and Niobe is sentenced to probation and work release. The museum sees record-high attendance due to publicity from the art heist.

== Development ==
=== Characters ===
- Nancy Drew (Lani Minella) - Nancy is an 18-year-old amateur detective from the fictional town of River Heights in the United States. She is the only playable character in the game, which means the player must solve the mystery from her perspective.
- Xenia Doukas (Julia Stockton) - Playing the lead role in the performance of Persephone in Winter, Xenia is a talented actress who is also the show's director. She keeps busy with her work on the play, but is her sweet personality and demanding workload blinding Xenia from what is truly going on behind the scenes? Or is her obsession with being a great actress masking her true intentions?
- Niobe Papadaki (Katherine Grant-Suttie) - Niobe plays the role of Demeter, Persephone's mother, but she is also the show's prop and stage artist. She has a strong interest in the museum's artifacts and is referencing the pieces for onstage props and design. Terrified of being onstage, Niobe tends to keep to herself and focuses on her work. But has Niobe been observing more than just artwork? Could she possibly shed some light on her other observations at the museum?
- Thanos Ganas (Beau Prichard) - Hades, the Greek god of the underworld, is large and intimidating, much like the actor who portrays him. Thanos lingers under the set, keeping an eye on all the stage hydraulics and making sure that the sets are working properly. He doesn't like anyone snooping under the stage and is very protective of the set. Is there more to reveal in the Underworld than Thanos is letting on?
- Grigor Karakinos (Jeff Pierce) - Cast as Hermes the Messenger, Grigor is also the stage manager and technician for the play. He works backstage with the lights, lifts, and other various stage assets. Charming and talkative, Grigor seems to know everyone and everything that is going on. He may help pick up interesting information, but is he holding anything back?
- Melina Rosi (Billie Wildrick) - The curator of the museum, Melina Rosi, has called you in to assist with the exhibit in time for the grand opening and upcoming play. Her museum staff are mysteriously abandoning their roles. However, Melina is undeterred and will do whatever it takes to hunt down the truth. No one is closer to the artifacts than Melina, but could she be hiding her true involvement in the missing exhibit pieces?
- Frank Hardy (Jonah Von Spreekin) & Joe Hardy (Rob Jones) - Returning as phone contacts, the Hardy Boys are available to help you with your case. They can provide vital information regarding Greek myths and shed additional light on the actors and the museum.

== Release ==
The game was released on October 14, 2014. Pre-orders began on September 9, 2014.

Preceded by Nancy Drew: The Shattered Medallion	Nancy Drew Computer Games	Succeeded by Nancy Drew: Sea of Darkness
