= Nancy Drew: The Captive Curse =

2011 video game

- Developer: Her Interactive
- Publisher: Her Interactive
- Platforms: Microsoft Windows; Mac OS X
- Release: June 28, 2011
- Genre: Adventure
- Mode: Single-player

The Captive Curse is the 24th installment in the Nancy Drew point-and-click adventure game series by Her Interactive. The game is available for play on Microsoft Windows and Mac OS X platforms. It has an ESRB rating of E10+ for moments of mild violence and peril. Players take on the first-person view of fictional amateur sleuth Nancy Drew and must solve the mystery through interrogation of suspects, solving puzzles, and discovering clues. There are two levels of gameplay, Junior and Senior detective modes, each offering a different difficulty level of puzzles and hints, however neither of these changes affect the plot of the game. The game is loosely based on the book Captive Witness (1981).

== Plot ==
For centuries, a legendary monster has terrorized residents of a Bavarian castle, called Castle Finster, in Germany. According to the legend, the monster will vanish for years at a time until, without warning, it reappears to claim its next victim. So far every victim it has claimed has been a young woman, reputed to be wearing a peculiar jeweled necklace at the time of her disappearance. In the present day, young American detective Nancy Drew has been called in by the castle's owner to discover the truth behind recent monster sightings, before the monster can strike again. As Nancy delves deeper into the case, she begins to fear that someone in the castle plans for her to be the monster's next victim.

== Development ==
=== Characters ===
- Nancy Drew (Lani Minella) – Nancy is an 18-year-old amateur detective from the fictional town of River Heights in the United States. She is the only playable character in the game, which means the player must solve the mystery from her perspective.
- Karl Weschler (Gerald B. Browning) - Karl is the "Bürgermeister," or mayor of the castle community. He keeps himself locked away in his office. He has dreams of becoming a famous board game designer, but is hindered by the belief that he is cursed due to a meeting with his doppelgänger at a young age. Karl ruffles many people's feathers, but he is most at odds with Anja Mittelmeier. He greatly dislikes that the castle is being used for tourism, and wishes to keep tourists away.
- Lukas Mittelmeier (Marianna de Fazio) - Lukas is the youngest resident of Castle Finster. His father, Franz Mittelmeier, is the head of security at the castle, and his aunt is Anja. Perhaps because he feels lonely, Lukas likes to play pranks on the other castle residents, especially Karl.
- Anja Mittelmeier (Sara Mountjoy-Pepka) - Anja is the Castellan of Castle Finster, meaning she is in charge of guest services. She is very open about the monster sightings, her past relationship with Markus, the castle's owner, and her negative feelings towards Karl. Lukas is her nephew.
- Renate Stoller (Julia Sachon) - Renate is a traveling storyteller, who is deeply familiar with the legend of the monster. She is not too keen on Nancy's presence and ominously warns her to keep away from the monster. Her favorite place to sit is the rocking chair by the dining room's fireplace.

Additional voice work was performed by Daniel Christenson, Jennifer Pratt, Chiara Motley, Keri Healey, Scott Kirk, Nicole Fierstein, Adrienne MacIain, Kira Lauren, and Mark Waldstein.

== Release ==
The game was officially released on June 28, 2011. It will be the first game in the series to feature improved installation, gameplay, and graphics through the use of a DVD for installation of physical copies of the game. On May 17, 2011, pre-orders were announced to begin on June 1, with each pre-ordered copy of the game including bonus content. Pre-orders concluded on June 15, 2011.

== Reception ==
Jinny Gudmundsen of USA Today rated it 3.5/4 stars and wrote, "The Captive Curse isn't the best Nancy Drew mystery from Her Interactive, but it is a well constructed one that will get kids thinking while they are entertained." Darcie King of Gamezebo rated it 4/5 stars and wrote that the game had excellent graphics and voice acting, but some players may be frustrated by the fact that dialogue cannot be skipped. Merlina McGovern of Adventure Gamers rated it 3/5 stars and wrote, "While fans of the Brothers Grimm may at first be intrigued by the premise of this fairy tale Nancy Drew, The Captive Curse is too limited to do the folklore books any real justice."

Preceded by Nancy Drew: Shadow at the Water's Edge	Nancy Drew Computer Games	Succeeded by Nancy Drew: Alibi in Ashes
