= Nancy Drew: Warnings at Waverly Academy =

2009 video game

- Developer: Her Interactive
- Publisher: Her Interactive
- Platform: Microsoft Windows
- Release: October 13, 2009
- Genre: Adventure
- Mode: Single-player

Warnings at Waverly Academy is the 21st installment in the Nancy Drew point-and-click adventure game series by Her Interactive. The game is available on Microsoft Windows platforms. It has an ESRB rating of E for moments of mild violence. Players take on the first-person view of fictional amateur sleuth Nancy Drew and must solve the mystery through interrogation of suspects, solving puzzles, and discovering clues. There are two levels of gameplay, Junior and Senior detective modes, each offering a different difficulty level of puzzles and hints, however neither of these changes affect the plot of the game. The game is loosely based on the book The Curse of the Black Cat (2000).

== Plot ==
Nancy Drew goes undercover as a transfer student named "Becca Sawyer" at the Waverly Academy for Girls, an exclusive boarding school in Upstate New York. The valedictorian candidates have been receiving threatening notes signed by someone called the "Black Cat". As soon as a girl receives two threats, something bad happens to her. One girl had a severe allergic reaction and had to be rushed to the hospital. Another was locked inside a pitch-black closet all night. The parents of the victims are threatening to sue the school if the perpetrator isn't identified quickly. Is there a secret someone wants to protect or are the girls playing games to scare away the competition permanently? The headmistress is counting on Nancy to solve the mystery before the threats turn deadly.

== Development ==
=== Characters ===
- Nancy Drew - Nancy is an 18-year-old amateur detective from the fictional town of River Heights in the United States. She is the only playable character in the game, which means the player must solve the mystery from her perspective.
- Izzy Romero - Izzy is the most popular girl in Waverly. She is the student body president and the life of the party. Keeping her crown as the queen of the school is no easy feat though. Is she resorting to scare tactics to keep everyone else from threatening her position at the top?
- Mel Corbalis - Mel is a self-professed outcast and recluse. She spends most of her time disliking the social cliques in school and practicing her cello. She was automatically accepted at Waverly because she comes from a long line of alumnae, but as the resident goth girl, she doesn't fit in. Would she send threats to the other girls to bring down the social ladder?
- Leela Yadav - Leela is Waverly's fiercely competitive all-star athlete, who juggles getting straight As with playing soccer and basketball. With the race for valedictorian heating up and the contenders so close in rank, would Leela's need to win at all costs drive her to make drastic plans to gain the competitive edge?
- Corine Myers - Corine is one of the smartest girls in the entire school, and she'll be the first to tell you so. The other girls think she tries too hard to be liked and most of them steer clear of her. Could Corine be sending threats to get the attention of the popular girls?
- Rachel Hubbard - Three weeks ago, Rachel nearly had the title of valedictorian in the bag, but then she failed an important test. For her to regain the lead, the other girls would also need to fail a test or paper. Could Rachel be trying to scare the other girls to distract them from their studies?

=== Cast ===
- Nancy Drew - Lani Minella
- Mel Corbalis - Samara Lerman
- Rachel Hubbard / Gossiping Girl - Adrienne MacIain
- Corine Myers - Emilie Rommel
- Izzy Romero - Khanh Doan
- Leela Yadav - Kasey Brockwell
- Megan Vargas / Gossiping Girl - Nicole Fierstein
- Ned Nickerson - Scott Carty
- Paige Griffin / Gossiping Girl - Charissa Bertels
- Gossiping Girl - Shanna Palmer

Preceded by Nancy Drew: Ransom of the Seven Ships	Nancy Drew Computer Games	Succeeded by Nancy Drew: Trail of the Twister
