= Nancy Drew: Ghost of Thornton Hall =

2013 video game

- Developer: Her Interactive
- Publisher: Her Interactive
- Platforms: Microsoft Windows; Mac OS X
- Release: May 14, 2013
- Genre: Adventure
- Mode: Single-player

Ghost of Thornton Hall is the 28th installment in the Nancy Drew point-and-click adventure game series by Her Interactive. The game is available for play on Microsoft Windows and Mac OS X platforms. It has an ESRB rating of E for moments of mild violence and peril. Players take on the first-person view of fictional amateur sleuth Nancy Drew and must solve the mystery through interrogation of suspects, solving puzzles, and discovering clues. There are two levels of gameplay, Amateur and Master sleuth modes, each offering a different difficulty level of puzzles and hints, however neither of these changes affect the plot of the game. The game is loosely based on the book Uncivil Acts (2005).

== Plot ==
Jessalyn Thornton and her best friend, Addison Hammond, visited the uninhabited Thornton Hall on an island off the coast of Georgia for a pre-wedding celebration and sleepover, but the fun ended when Jessalyn disappeared. Now Jessalyn's friends, family, and coworkers search the undergrowth and abandoned spaces throughout Blackrock Island, seeking any evidence that might lead to her whereabouts. That's why paranormal expert Savannah Woodham called in Nancy Drew to investigate potential leads. This case requires a skeptic, someone who isn't afraid of a place where stories of the supernatural hang as thick as Spanish moss from cypress trees. Did the heiress to the Thornton business empire vanish among the monuments, or is someone holding something besides family secrets?

== Development ==
=== Characters ===
- Nancy Drew (Lani Minella) - Nancy is an 18-year-old amateur detective from the fictional town of River Heights in the United States. She is the only playable character in the game, which means the player must solve the mystery from her perspective.
- Jessalyn Thornton (Julia Stockton) - Daughter of Clara Thornton and heiress to her family business, Jessalyn disappears just days before her wedding to Colton Birchfield. Could she have run away because of wedding jitters? Or was she kidnapped? Is there a rational explanation for her disappearance? Or does it involve the supernatural?
- Harper Thornton (Keri Healey) - Harper is known for being the black sheep of the family and is kept a secret from outsiders for the sake of the untarnished family name. She believes that her older sister, Charlotte, was murdered long ago. Could her theory be true or is she simply a dangerous distraction to your investigation?
- Clara Thornton (Sharon Yamada-Heidner) - Clara is the CEO of the family business and the Thornton family matriarch. The circumstances surrounding Jessalyn's unexplained departure have her worried and nervous. She grew up in Thornton Hall, which holds many memories for her. How much is she willing to share with you? Although clearly distraught over her missing daughter, is Clara hiding valuable information about Jessalyn's disappearance?
- Wade Thornton (Jeff Allen Pierce) - Having a shady past makes Wade an embarrassment to Clara, but with a strong sense of duty, he has returned to Thornton Hall to help track down Jessalyn. Wade reached out to Savannah for help since he believes in the supernatural. Could his knowledge and skills prove he has another motive for being here?
- Colton Birchfield (Dave Rivas) - Colton is Jessalyn's fiancé and comes across as charming and suave. Everyone deals with a crisis in their own way, but Colton seems emotionally detached from his bride-to-be's disappearance. Is this spruce fiancé exhausted from searching for Jessalyn, or is he holding back something that he can't share?

Additional voice work was performed by Patrick Hogan and Adrienne MacIain.

=== Inspiration ===
The game takes place at the fictional setting of Blackrock Island, Georgia. Thornton Hall and the structures surrounding it take inspiration from a variety of real-world places.

- Wormsloe Historic Site - The entrance to the estate is dominated by an arched stone gateway inscribed with the name Thornton Hall. A similar entry gate can be found to the Wormsloe Plantation Historic Site near Savannah, Georgia.
- Oak Alley Plantation - The exterior of Thornton Hall and the live oak alley that leads up to the house are directly inspired by Oak Alley Plantation, a historic plantation located in St. James Parish, Louisiana on the west bank of the Mississippi River.

== Release ==
The game was released on May 14, 2013, though pre-orders began on April 9, 2013. Special editions of the game, which included bonus games, phone charms, outtakes, and audio tracks were sent out to those who pre-ordered the game directly from Her Interactive. In the trailer that was released with The Deadly Device, one who has played Ghost of Thornton Hall can clearly tell that the ghostly figure depicted in the trailer is Harper, but the ghost's design has changed since the release of the game.

== Reception ==
Brandy Shaul of Gamezebo rated it 4/5 stars and wrote, "Ghost of Thornton Hall continues to provide some of the best storytelling around, and the game's ample dialog means even the most die-hard player will take a few hours to unravel all of its secrets. While navigation may be cumbersome, it's definitely not a deal breaker, and it's far too easy to get sucked into the game and never want to stop until you reach the conclusion." Adventure Gamers deemed the game satisfying yet uneven. Hooked Gamers found some of the subplots distracting and trivial, as opposed to the world-building subplots found in other titles of the series. Commonsensemedia thought the game played it safe, however delivered well on its formula. Gameboomers was disappointed that this title had less educational value than its fellow Nancy Drew games.

Preceded by Nancy Drew: The Deadly Device	Nancy Drew Computer Games	Succeeded by Nancy Drew: The Silent Spy
