= Nancy Drew: Trail of the Twister =

2010 video game

- Developer: Her Interactive
- Publisher: Her Interactive
- Platforms: Microsoft Windows; Mac OS X
- Release: June 29, 2010
- Genre: Adventure
- Mode: Single-player

Trail of the Twister is the 22nd installment in the Nancy Drew point-and-click adventure game series by Her Interactive. It is available for play on Microsoft Windows and Mac OS X platforms. It has an ESRB rating of E for moments of mild violence and comic mischief. Players take on the first-person view of fictional amateur sleuth Nancy Drew and must solve the mystery through interrogation of suspects, solving puzzles, and discovering clues. There are two levels of gameplay, Junior and Senior detective modes, each offering a different difficulty level of puzzles and hints, however neither of these changes affect its plot. It is loosely based on the book The Mystery in Tornado Alley (2000).

== Plot ==
Nancy Drew travels to Oklahoma to go undercover as an intern for a prominent storm research team at Canute College. The team is competing in the upcoming Green Skies storm competition, which will grant $100 million to whichever team can produce the best theories as to the cause of tornadogenesis. A series of equipment failures and other mishaps, such as their previous intern breaking his leg in a storm, has led the team's sponsor, manufacturing entrepreneur P.G. Krolmeister, to hire Nancy to investigate.

Nancy sees a tornado as she is driving up to the farmhouse that serves as the team's home base. Canute College professor and team leader Scott Varnell tells Nancy that his department, recently defunded by the college, will likely be shut down entirely if they don't win the money from the competition. Nancy also meets Debbie Kircum, the project manager and a recent meteorology PhD graduate; Chase Relerford, the team mechanic; and Tobias "Frosty" Harlow, the team's photographer and media coordinator. Nancy calls Krolmeister, who insists that the equipment he is supplying to the team would not break on its own and someone must be sabotaging it.

Nancy's intern duties lead her to Ma 'n' Pa's General Store and Museum, where she meets owner "Pa," whose wife, Betsy "Ma" Ochs, died in a tornado prior to the events of the game. She overhears him talking to Brooke Tavanah, the leader of the other frontrunning team in the competition, about how Scott's team is doing. When the team members take Nancy to chase a nearby tornado, Frosty's video camera breaks, and although Nancy fixes it successfully, he claims it did not record any footage. Later, while Nancy is driving back from an errand, her GPS leads her straight through a dangerous storm; she tells Debbie she believes someone tampered with it.

The next day, as the team is preparing to chase another tornado, a burst of lightning knocks out the house phone. While Nancy is fixing it, she accidentally intercepts a cell phone conversation between Scott and Brooke discussing a "deal." Nancy also learns that Scott was denied tenure at the college due to the substandard quality of his research; meanwhile, Debbie has been turning down tenure-track professorship offers at other schools, presumably because she is anticipating taking over the team at Canute. Nancy finds evidence that Chase has been searching for oil using a divining rod stolen from Pa's museum; Chase admits this, saying he hopes to earn enough money to buy the farmhouse (since Canute will likely sell it if their team loses the competition), although he denies sabotaging the team. Nancy sees tornado footage from Frosty's camera on the local news, meaning he lied about the camera not working. Frosty admits that he has been secretly selling footage to a local photographer, which goes against his contract with the team, although he also insists he is not responsible for the equipment failures.

The next day, Nancy finds a note Brooke wrote to Scott indicating she is paying him to let her team win. Nancy confronts Scott in a nearby field with a tornado fast approaching. He admits he has been sabotaging his own team to ensure Brooke's team wins; he says he is angry that Canute does not respect his work or compensate him appropriately, and has given him a reputation of being "impossible to work with" so he cannot get a job elsewhere. Scott knocks Nancy unconscious, but she awakens in time to make it to the town's emergency shelter as the tornado is approaching. After the worst of the tornado has passed, Nancy intercepts Scott before he is able to leave town. Scott is arrested for destruction of public property, and he and Brooke both lose their jobs. Debbie combines the remaining members of both teams and they perform well leading up to the competition, although the game ends before a winner is determined.

== Characters ==
- Scott Varnell: A professor at Canute College and the leader of the Canute chase team.
- Debbie Kircum: The team's project manager. Nancy reports to her for tasks at the beginning of each day.
- Chase Relerford: The team mechanic. He's always found in the barn. Nancy can earn Pa Pennies from him by working on circuit boards.
- Tobias "Frosty" Harlow: The team photographer. He earned his nickname when he took iconic pictures of a hailstorm.
- Pa: Owner of Ma 'n' Pa's General Store. He's very friendly and enjoys working in theater.
- Brooke Tavanah: Leader of the rival Kingston University chase team.

Preceded by Nancy Drew: Warnings at Waverly Academy	Nancy Drew Computer Games	Succeeded by Nancy Drew: Secrets Can Kill Remastered and Nancy Drew: Shadow at the Water's Edge
