= Nancy Drew on Campus =

Book series

- Author: Carolyn Keene
- Country: United States
- Language: English
- Genre: Young adult novel
- Publisher: Archway
- Published: 1995 - 1998
- Media type: Print (Paperback)
- No. of books: 25

Nancy Drew on Campus is a series of twenty-five books published as a young adult spin-off from the long-running Nancy Drew mystery series. The series was published between 1995 and 1998 by Simon & Schuster's imprint Archway and followed Nancy and her friends as they attended college and dealt with issues such as date rape and drug usage.

Nancy Drew on Campus utilized reader interaction, most notably in the first two books where they were asked to call a 1-800 number to decide whether Nancy and her boyfriend Ned were to break up or stay together. Nancy Drew ends her relationship to Ned Nickerson in the second book in the series, supposedly based on reader feedback to the telephone poll in the previous book.

This series focused more on romance and problems facing teens than on mysteries. A large group of new characters was introduced and became the focus of story-lines during the run of the series. Nancy Drew works as a reporter for the school newspaper and becomes involved in minor mysteries, often the sub-plot or tertiary plot of the book. The larger secondary cast takes center stage as they deal with drugs, potential pregnancy, date rape, and other incidents that are the staples of the genre.

The series was cancelled in 1997, when Simon & Schuster decided to cancel all Nancy Drew & Hardy Boys spin-offs.

The 2002 Nancy Drew TV movie seemed to be partially inspired by the Nancy Drew On Campus series.

== Synopsis ==
The series followed Nancy and her friends George and Bess as they attend the fictional Wilder University. Nancy is attending in order to receive a degree in journalism, much to the chagrin of her longtime boyfriend Ned Nickerson, who wants her to attend Emerson College with him instead. Despite initial attempts to make their relationship work, the two break up in the second book On Her Own after Nancy decides that Ned is too controlling.

== List of books in the series ==
1. New Lives, New Loves
2. On Her Own
3. Don't Look Back
4. Tell Me the Truth
5. Secret Rules
6. It's Your Move
7. False Friends
8. Getting Closer
9. Broken Promises
10. Party Weekend
11. In the Name of Love
12. Just the Two of Us
13. Campus Exposures
14. Hard to Get
15. Loving and Losing
16. Going Home
17. New Beginnings
18. Keeping Secrets
19. Love On-Line
20. Jealous Feelings
21. Love and Betrayal
22. In and Out of Love
23. Otherwise Engaged
24. In the Spotlight
25. Snowbound

== Reception ==
Reception to the series was mixed, with some critics viewing the inclusion of adult themes such as date rape "unsuccessful". In her book Sisters, Schoolgirls, and Sleuths, Carolyn Carpan commented that the series was "more soap opera romance than mystery" and that Nancy "comes across as dumb, missing easy clues she wouldn't have missed in previous series". The series was also criticized for focusing more on romance than on grades or studying, with one critic stating that the series resembled collegiate academic studying in the 1950s, where "women were more interested in pursuing ... the "MRS" degree."
