= Nancy Drew: The Silent Spy =

2013 video game

- Developer: Her Interactive
- Publisher: Her Interactive
- Platforms: Microsoft Windows; Mac OS X
- Release: October 22, 2013
- Genre: Adventure
- Mode: Single-player

The Silent Spy is the 29th installment in the Nancy Drew point-and-click adventure game series by Her Interactive. It runs Microsoft Windows and Mac OS X platforms and has an ESRB rating of E for moments of mild violence and peril.

A player takes on the first-person view of fictional amateur sleuth Nancy Drew and may solve the mystery through interrogation of suspects, solving of puzzles and discovery of clues. There are two difficulty levels, Amateur and Master, offering appropriately challenging puzzles and hints without affecting the plot. The game is loosely based on the book The Clue of the Whistling Bagpipes (1964).

== Plot ==
Nearly a decade ago Agent Kate Drew left home to neutralize a biochemical weapon in Scotland. While her assignment was a success, she died in a car accident (or so it was told). Now the echoes of a similar plot reverberate and it is up to the player, as detective Nancy Drew, to thwart the sleeper cell and expose the truth.

== Release ==
The game was released on October 15, 2013, and preorders began on September 16. Special editions which included bonus games, phone charms, outtakes and audio tracks were sent to those who preordered from Her Interactive.

Preceded by Nancy Drew: Ghost of Thornton Hall	Nancy Drew Computer Games	Succeeded by Nancy Drew: The Shattered Medallion
