= Nancy Drew: Sea of Darkness =

2015 video game

- Developer: Her Interactive
- Publisher: Her Interactive
- Platforms: Microsoft Windows; Mac OS X
- Release: May 19, 2015
- Genre: Adventure
- Mode: Single-player

Sea of Darkness is the 32nd installment in the Nancy Drew point-and-click adventure game series by Her Interactive. Players take on the first-person view of fictional amateur sleuth Nancy Drew and must solve the mystery through interrogation of suspects, solving puzzles, and discovering clues. There are two levels of gameplay, Amateur and Master sleuth modes, each offering a different difficulty level of puzzles and hints; however, neither of these changes affect the plot of the game. It is the last game to feature Lani Minella as the voice of Nancy Drew, and is also the last game to use Her Interactive's proprietary game engine. The next game, Midnight in Salem, uses Unity. ESRB rates the game 10+ for mild alcohol reference and violent blood.

== Plot ==
The ship Heerlijkheid is often the centerpiece of Skipbrot, Iceland's local festival. After the ship's captain disappears, Heerlijkheid becomes a distraction itself while the fate of the captain remains a mystery.

== Release ==
The game was released on May 19, 2015, though pre-orders began on April 14, 2015.

== Reception ==
Merlina McGovern from Adventure Gamers rated the game 3.5/5 stars by saying: "an intriguing mystery, strong acting, and a variety of interesting places to explore overcame the lack of proper puzzle integration for me. Sea of Darkness may not be the best Nancy Drew adventure in the series, but other than some frustrating progress blocks, I was happy to spend time wandering around a desolate, icy world exploring both the town and its people, uncovering and shedding light on the darkness".

Common Sense Media rated the game 4/5 stars and said: "The last two Nancy Drew games have been plagued by lackluster locations, dull stories, and obscure puzzles, so it's great that Nancy Drew: Sea of Darkness does justice to the teenage sleuth. Though it suffers a bit from repetitiveness, it's a good deal more fun."

Just Adventure graded the game A− and found the puzzles in the game "some of the best Her Interactive has created in a long while".

| Preceded by Nancy Drew: Labyrinth of Lies | Nancy Drew Computer Games | Succeeded by Nancy Drew: Midnight in Salem |
