= HeR Interactive =

American video game developer

- Type: Private
- Industry: Video games
- Founded: 1995
- Headquarters: Bellevue, Washington, United States
- Website: HerInteractive.com

HeR Interactive is a video game company based in Bellevue, Washington. The company was founded as a division of American Laser Games, and spun off as an independent entity. It later bought out its former parent company. The company designs, develops and publishes adventure-mystery games, most of which are based on the Nancy Drew franchise.

== History ==
The company was launched as a division of American Laser Games called "Games for Her Interactive" in May 1995. Its first title was McKenzie & Co. After finding some initial success, the company became independent of American Laser Games and eventually bought out its former parent company. Her Interactive relocated to Bellevue, Washington in the late 1990s. Since 1998, the company developed 34 entries in its Nancy Drew adventure-mystery game series. Nancy Drew: Codes & Clues has been praised for encouraging girls to learn coding.

Stuart Moulder joined as CEO in May 2011 with a goal of diversifying the company's funding sources. He left the company in 2014. Penny Milliken replaced him that same year. Nancy Drew: Midnight in Salem, suffered many delays from its planned release at the end of 2015, due in part to the firing of a good majority of their staff. An official announcement made by HER indicated the game was set to be released November 19, 2019. However, it was pushed back, finally releasing on December 3, 2019, to mixed reviews.

In April 2023, the company announced that a new Nancy Drew game is currently in development, with several teasers released on their social media. Nancy Drew: Mystery of the Seven Keys was released on May 7, 2024.

== List of games ==
=== Nancy Drew Adventure ===
- Secrets Can Kill (PC 1998)
- Stay Tuned for Danger (PC 1999)
- Message in a Haunted Mansion (PC 2000/GBA 2001)
- Treasure in the Royal Tower (PC 2001)
- The Final Scene (PC 2001)
- Secret of the Scarlet Hand (PC 2002)
- Ghost Dogs of Moon Lake (PC 2002)
- The Haunted Carousel (PC 2003)
- Danger on Deception Island (PC 2003)
- The Secret of Shadow Ranch (PC 2004)
- Curse of Blackmoor Manor (PC 2004/DVD 2007)
- Secret of the Old Clock (PC 2005)
- Last Train to Blue Moon Canyon (PC 2005)
- Danger by Design (PC 2006)
- The Creature of Kapu Cave (PC 2006)
- The White Wolf of Icicle Creek (PC 2007/Nintendo Wii 2008)
- Legend of the Crystal Skull (PC 2007)
- The Phantom of Venice (PC 2008)
- The Haunting of Castle Malloy (PC 2008)
- Ransom of the Seven Ships (PC 2009)
- Warnings at Waverly Academy (PC 2009)
- Trail of the Twister (PC/Mac 2010)
- Secrets Can Kill Remastered (PC/Mac 2010)
- Shadow at the Water's Edge (PC/Mac 2010)
- The Captive Curse (PC/Mac 2011)
- Alibi in Ashes (PC/Mac 2011)
- Tomb of the Lost Queen (PC/Mac 2012)
- The Deadly Device (PC/Mac 2012)
- Ghost of Thornton Hall (PC/Mac 2013, iPad/Android/Kindle Fire 2014)
- The Silent Spy (PC/Mac 2013)
- The Shattered Medallion (PC/Mac 2014)
- Labyrinth of Lies (PC/Mac 2014)
- Sea of Darkness (PC/Mac 2015)
- Midnight in Salem (PC/Mac 2019)
- Mystery of the Seven Keys (PC/Mac 2024)

=== Nancy Drew Dossier ===
- Lights, Camera, Curses (PC 2008)
- Resorting to Danger (PC 2009)
- Ship of Shadows (cancelled)

=== Nancy Drew Mobile Mysteries ===
- Shadow Ranch (iPad/iPhone/iPod Touch 2011)
- Castle Finster (cancelled)

=== Other releases from Her Interactive ===
- McKenzie & Co (PC 1995)
- The Vampire Diaries (PC 1996)
- The Cody Capers: Cody Pops the Case (PC 2007)
- The Hardy Boys: Treasure on the Tracks (Nintendo DS 2009)
- Nancy Drew: Codes & Clues (iPad/Android/Kindle Fire 2016)
- Odyssey: The Young Socratics (Release only) (PC/Mac 2017)
