= Lani Minella =

American voice actress

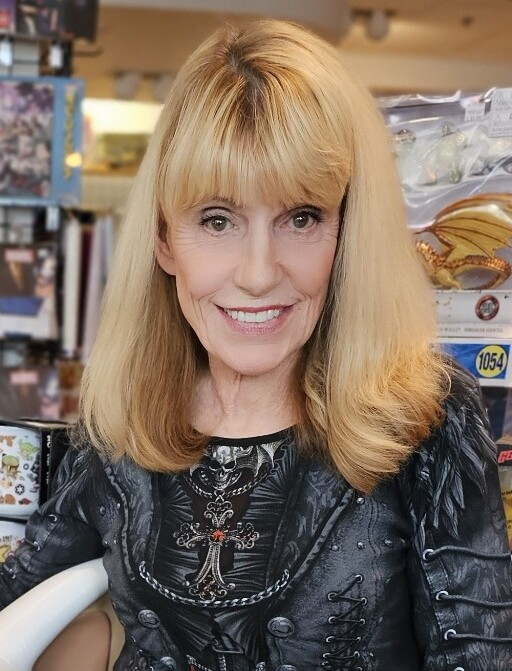
- Minella at a Sonic Adventure 2 cast reunion in 2024.
- Born: San Diego, California, U.S.
- Education: San Diego State University
- Occupations: Voice actress; voice director; producer
- Years active: 1992–present
- Website: laniminella.com

Lani Minella is an American voice actress, voice director, and producer mainly working in the video game industry. She is the founder of the voice-acting agency AudioGodz. By August 2024, Minella was recognized by Guinness World Records as the most prolific video game voice actress, surpassing previous titleholder Jennifer Hale.

Since starting her career and becoming well known for her unique four-octave vocal range, Minella has appeared in multiple video game franchises such as Diablo, StarCraft, Duke Nukem, Backyard Sports, Warcraft, Baldur's Gate, Unreal, Borderlands, and Darksiders. As well, she has provided many voices for characters in various other video games, most notably roles like Nancy Drew in the video game series, Gabriella in Blood II: The Chosen, Rouge the Bat and Omochao from Sonic the Hedgehog in their debut, Ivy Valentine from SoulCalibur, Eve in Mass Effect 3, and Lucas in Super Smash Bros. Minella has also done multiple roles in a game such as Sindel and Sheeva in Mortal Kombat (2011), Gloria and the Red Run in Remothered: Tormented Fathers, and the creature voices for Clickers, Bloaters, and Infected in The Last of Us and its sequel.

== Career ==
After college, Minella started on Morning Drive radio for an alternative station in the late 1980s. After hearing her celebrity impersonations, GTE Interactive Media contacted Minella and asked her to imitate voices from the film FernGully: The Last Rainforest, which was being pitched for a LaserDisc presentation to Magnavox and Philips. She was then referred by the company to their CD-ROM division, where she worked on more voices and assisted with script writing on games for children. Minella asked the company if there were others doing similar work, and they suggested that she should go to trade shows, which led her to attend showcases like Consumer Electronics Show in Las Vegas, Game Developers Conference in San Jose, and Electronic Entertainment Expo in Los Angeles, where she gave out business cards but failed to get any offers. This led her to start her own company, AudioGodz, a production company specializing in all aspects of voiceovers from talent to casting, directing, writing and production, in 1992.

In 1996, Minella worked on a major first-person shooter video game, Duke Nukem 3D, as voice director and actress, voicing most of the female characters in the series. She helped cast the voice actor of Duke Nukem, Jon St. John, who she met after being cast as the voice for a commercial he was producing in San Diego. After being impressed by her voices, St. John imitated the voices back at Minella and she asked if he had ever done voice acting for video games. Soon after, she got him a telephone interview with the game's creator, George Broussard, and eventually got him the part of Duke.

Minella's first major voice role in a video game was for HeR Interactive's adventure-mystery series Nancy Drew, starring as the titular character Nancy Drew, debuting with 1998's Secrets Can Kill. Minella reprised her role as Nancy Drew in 31 other video games, with her last being Sea of Darkness in 2015. HeR Interactive's CEO decided to find a voice actress local to the Seattle area, as Minella resides in San Diego.

== Personal life ==
Minella is of Italian descent from her father's side. In her spare time, she does vocal coaching, gardening, and caring for her rescue pets. She lives in San Diego, California.

== Filmography ==
=== Animation ===
List of voice performances in animation
Year	Title	Role	Crew role, notes	Source
2002	Burn-Up Excess	Maya Jingu, others	English dub	Resume
2003	.hack//SIGN	Girl	English dub	
2003	Geneshaft	Dolce Saito, Chacha, others	English dub	
2006	Justice League Unlimited	Mayor of Central City	Episode: "Flash and Substance"	
2007	All Grown Up!	Kid, Old Woman	Episode: "TP + KF"	
2018	Motown Magic	Lorenzo		

=== Feature films ===
List of voice performances in feature films
Year	Title	Role	Crew role, notes	Source
1992	FernGully: The Last Rainforest	Background voices	Debut voice role, LaserDisc release	
2019	The Queen's Corgi	Ginger	US Version	
2019	It Chapter Two		Loop Group	Tweet
2025	The Colors Within	Kimi's Grandmother	English dub	Tweet

=== Video games ===
List of voice performances in video games
Year	Title	Role	Crew role, notes, region	Source
1995	Astal	All voices		
1996	Bubsy 3D	All voices	Voice talent	
1996	Candy Land Adventure	Captain Cookie, Princess Lolly, Queen Frostine, Gramma Nut, Tree 2, Red Ant 1, Queen Bee, Miner 1		
1996	Diablo	Adria the Witch, Wirt the Peg-Legged Boy		
1997	Snowboard Kids	Slash Kamei, Nancy Neil, Jam Kuehnemund, Linda Maltinie, Mr. Dog		
1997–2002	The Land Before Time games	Littlefoot, Cera, Ducky, Petrie, Chomper, Spike, Mo	Voice characterization	
1997	Nightmare Ned	Hilda Needlemeyer	Video game only	
1998	StarCraft	Dropship Pilot		
1998	Rocky & Bullwinkle's Know-It-All Quiz Game	Sherman		
1998–2015	Nancy Drew games	Nancy Drew, various characters		
1999	Snowboard Kids 2	Slash Kamei, Damien, Wendy Lane		
1999	Blue Stinger	Janine King	Voice actor and director	
1999	Evil Zone	Alty Lazel, Midori Himeno, Ihadurca		
1999	Duke Nukem: Zero Hour	Female Commander	Voice actor	
1999–2004	Sonic the Hedgehog games	Station Square Announcer, Omochao, Rouge the Bat, Void	Voice actor and director; US/EUR/NA	
1999	Tail Concerto	Waffle Ryebread, Panta		
1999	40 Winks	Ruff, Tumble, Robot Tumble, mother		
2000	Maken X	Various voices		
2000	Evil Dead: Hail to the King	Anne Knowby, Grammy, Deadites		
2000	D2	Martha		
2001	Diablo II: Lord of Destruction	Blood Raven, The Countess, Andariel, Malah, Ancients		
2001	Half-Life: Decay	Colette Green		
2001	AirBlade	Kat	Voice actor and director	
2001	Frogger: The Great Quest	Various characters		
2001	Illbleed	Eriko Christy, various characters		
2002	Backyard Baseball 2003	Sunny Day, Vinnie the Gooch, others		
2002	Slots from Bally Gaming	Olive Oyl, Betty Boop		
2002	Backyard Football	Sunny Day, others		
2003	Backyard Soccer 2004	Sunny Day, Earl Grey, others		
2003	Rogue Ops	Nikki Connors		
2003	Go! Go! Hypergrind	Piggy Sue, Bob, Jenny		
2004	Counter-Strike: Condition Zero	Female VOs (deleted scenes)	Casting (over 200 voices), director	
2005	Devil May Cry 3: Dante's Awakening	Female Spider, Reaper Creature		
2005–present	Soulcalibur games	Ivy Valentine	Voice actor	
2006	The Lord of the Rings: The Battle for Middle Earth II	Galadriel, Spider Rider		
2006	Runaway 2: The Dream of Turtle	Gina Timmins, Tarantula, Alpha, Aolani, Rosa		
2007	Fire Emblem: Radiant Dawn	Mia, Micaiah, Mist, various others	Voice actor	
2007-2013, 2018	Professor Layton games	Luke (US English), Flora, Emmy, various others		
2008	Super Smash Bros. Brawl	Lucas, Lyn (English), Pit (English)		
2008	Penumbra: Black Plague	Hive Mind		
2008	Penumbra: Requiem	Dr. Richard Eminiss		
2009	Marvel: Ultimate Alliance 2	Lucia von Bardas		
2009	Mario & Sonic at the Olympic Winter Games	Omochao	DS version only; archive footage	
2009	Borderlands	Commandant Steele		
2009	New Super Mario Bros. Wii	Larry Koopa, Morton Koopa Jr., Wendy O. Koopa and Lemmy Koopa		
2010	Darksiders	Silitha, Tiamat		
2010	Amnesia: The Dark Descent	Girl, Mother, Clarice	Voice director	
2011	Warhammer 40,000: Dawn of War II – Retribution	Hive Mind		
2011	The Elder Scrolls V: Skyrim	The Night Mother, Nocturnal, Aranea Ienith, Cindiri Arano, Dravynea the Stoneweaver, Idesa Sadri, Ildari Sarothril, Irileth, Jenassa, Marise Aravel, Niluva Hlaalu, Priestess of Boethiah, Sabine Nytte, Suvaris Atheron, Synda Llanith, Tilisu Severin, Katria, Female Dunmer		
2011	Mortal Kombat	Sindel, Sheeva		
2012	Mass Effect 3	Eve, Asari Medic		
2012	New Super Mario Bros. 2	Larry, Morton, Wendy and Lemmy		
2012	Lucius	Mary		
2012	New Super Mario Bros. U	Larry, Morton, Wendy and Lemmy		
2013	StarCraft II: Heart of the Swarm	Slivan		
2013	The Last of Us	Clickers, Runners, Bloaters	Voice actor	
2014	Strider	Nang Pooh, Xi Mang Wu, Female broadcaster		
2014	Off The Record: The Italian Affair	Gabriella		
2014	Super Smash Bros. for Nintendo 3DS and Wii U	Larry, Morton, Wendy, Lemmy, Lyn (English), and Lucas		
2015	Awesomenauts	Nibbs		
2016	Rad Rodgers: World One	The Jungle Elder		
2017	Fire Emblem Heroes	Mia		
2017	XCOM 2 War of the Chosen	Chosen Assassin		
2017	Remothered: Tormented Fathers	Gloria, Red Nun	As Lani "Alien Ilmann" Minella	
2018	Subnautica	Sea Emperor Leviathan		
2018	Remothered: Tormented Fathers	Gloria Ashmann, Red Nun		
2018	War for the Overworld: The Under Games	Overlord Lamash		
2018	God of War	Pesta		
2018	Bendy and the Ink Machine	Lacie Benton		
2018	Super Smash Bros. Ultimate	Lucas, Lyn (English), Larry, Morton, Wendy, Lemmy		
2019	MediEvil	Narrator		
2020	Summit of the Wolf	Adena, Deana Kethagee, Epha Ilo, Narrator, Ori, SallyGropner, Wanda the Tree		
2020	The Last of Us Part II	Clickers, Runners, Bloaters	Voice actor	
2020	Wasteland 3	Other VO	(Less than 40 lines) (As Lani Manilla)	
2020	Remothered: Broken Porcelain	The Keeper		
2020	Sim Settlements 2	Judge Bishop, Shhandy		
2020	World of Warcraft: Shadowlands	Additional voices		
2020	Remothered: Double Pack	Gloria Ashmann		
2021	Choices: Stories You Play	Olivia Ashton, Rachel Winthrop, Mary Zilberg, Kenna Rys, Audrey, Fiddler, Officer Dawes		
2021	The Captain is Dead	Diplomat		
2021	Shadow Man Remastered	Nettie		
2021	Mass Effect: Legendary Edition	Eve, Asari Medic		
2021	Chivalry 2	Female Agathian Warrior		
2021	Happy's Humble Burger Farm	Happy the Humble Heifer, Monsters		
2022	Lord of the Rings Online: Rangers and Ruins	Hrimil		
2022	God of War Ragnarök	Raven Keeper		
2022	Chivalry 2: Tenosian Invasion	Tenosian Tigris		
2022	Hearthstone: Voyage to the Sunken City	Lady S'Theno, Eelbound archer, Twinbow Terrorcoil		
2022	Identity V	Keigan Nicholas Keogh (Clerk)		
2022	Back 4 Blood ("Tunnels of Terror")		Cultist Sniper	
2022	Overlode	Female Drone		
2023	Dead Space (remake)	Necromorph		
2023	Killer Klowns from Outer Space: The Game	Klownzilla, Tank, Tracker, Scout	Casting, director	
2023	Genshin Impact	Janaki		
2026	Professor Layton and the New World of Steam	Luke Triton		

=== Podcast ===
List of voice performances in podcasts
Year	Title	Role	Notes	Source
2016–2017	Liberty: Critical Research	Baal		
2016–2019	Liberty: Tales From the Tower	Various		
2017–2022	The White Vault	Dr. Rosa De La Torre	Main; season 1-2; guest season 4; recurring season 5)	
2020–2021	VAST Horizon	Commander Graan		
