= Nancy Drew and the Hidden Staircase =

Nancy Drew and the Hidden Staircase may refer to:

- Nancy Drew and the Hidden Staircase (1939 film)
- Nancy Drew and the Hidden Staircase (2019 film)
- The Hidden Staircase, a novel in the Nancy Drew Mystery Stories series
