= The Secret of the Old Clock =

Nancy Drew 1, published 1930

Nancy Drew and the Secret of the Old Clock
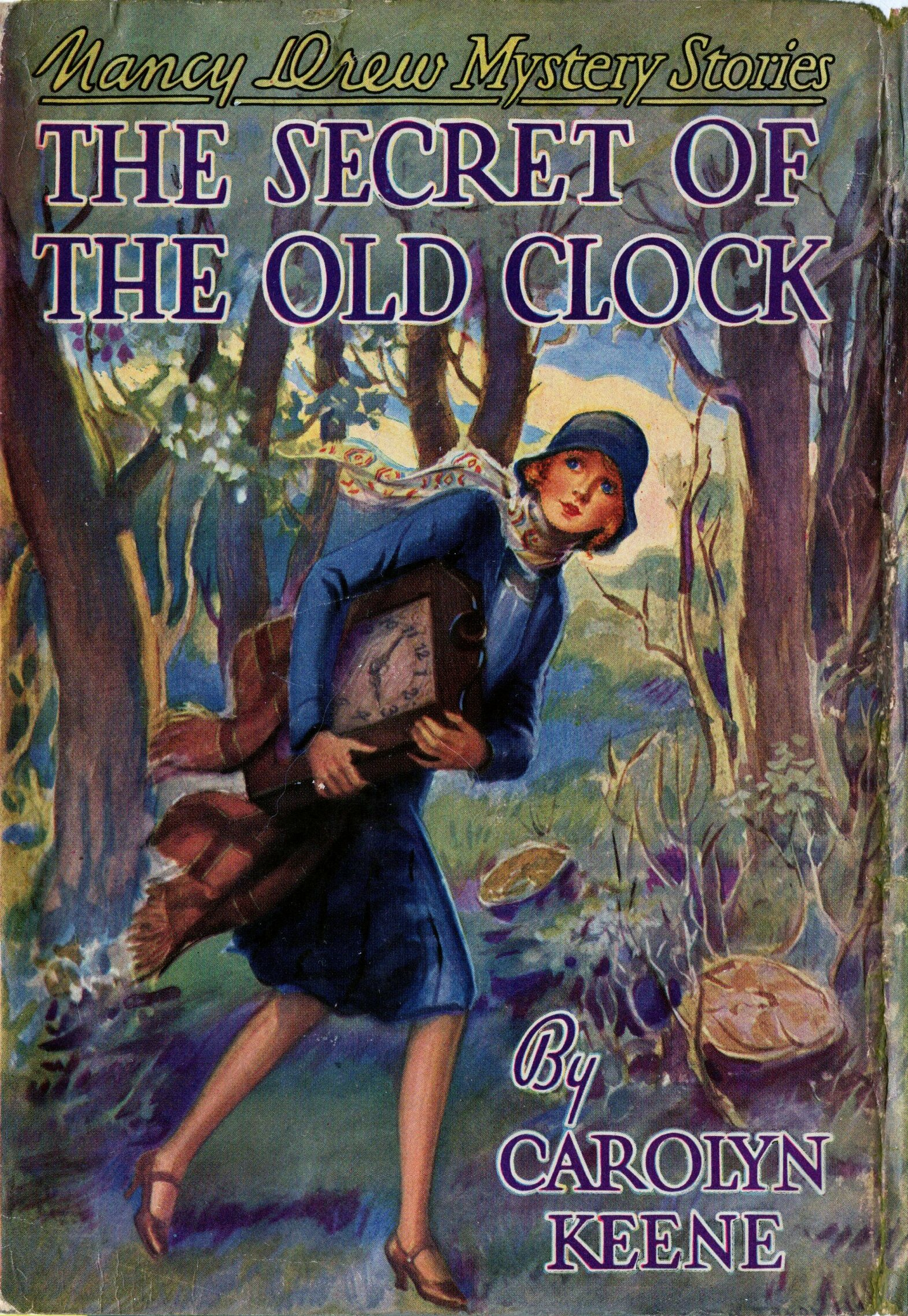
- Original cover by Russell H. Tandy
- Author: Carolyn Keene
- Illustrator: Russell H. Tandy
- Cover artist: Russell H. Tandy
- Language: English
- Series: Nancy Drew Mystery Stories
- Genre: Juvenile literature
- Publisher: Grosset & Dunlap
- Publication date: April 28, 1930 (original); May 15, 1959 (revised edition)
- Publication place: United States
- Media type: Print (hardback and paperback)
- Pages: 210 (1930–1959); 180
- ISBN: 0-448-45530-7
- Followed by: The Hidden Staircase

The Secret of the Old Clock is the first volume in the Nancy Drew Mystery Stories series, written under the pseudonym Carolyn Keene. It was first published on April 28, 1930, and rewritten in 1959 by Harriet Stratemeyer Adams. On January 1, 2026, the original version of the novel entered the public domain in the US.

Nancy Drew is a sixteen-year-old high school graduate (her age was changed to eighteen in the 1959 rewrite). Her father, Carson Drew, is a well-known criminal defense lawyer. The Drews reside in River Heights and employ a housekeeper, Hannah Gruen. In early editions, she is depicted as a mere servant; later in the series, she becomes more of a family member.

In 2001, the novel ranked 53rd on Publishers Weekly's list of the all-time best-selling hardcover children's books in English, having sold about 2.7 million copies.

== Summaries ==
=== 1930 edition ===
Sixteen-year-old pretty, golden-haired Nancy Drew wishes to help the Turners, who are struggling relatives of the recently deceased Josiah Crowley, by finding a missing will that can give them claim to Crowley's estate. Aided along the way by friend Helen Corning, she becomes interested in the case because she dislikes Crowley's snobbish nouveau riche social-climbing heirs presumptive, the Tophams.

A nasty encounter at a department store allows Nancy to discredit the Topham sisters when they break an expensive imported vase. Interviewing various Crowley relatives and friends, Nancy learns from an injured old lady that Crowley hinted that the clue to his will would be found in the family clock. When Helen gives Nancy charity tickets to sell, she sells them to the Tophams to gain entry to their home and quiz them about the clock.

Nancy then joins Helen at summer camp to investigate the Topham summer home nearby. There, she is overpowered by the burglar who stole the Crowley clock and the rest of the Topham furniture. She is imprisoned in the vacant house while the caretaker is recovering from a crook-induced drunken stupor. She is able to obtain the titular clock while the burglars drink wine and beer heavily (and illegally) at a wayside inn. (In the United States, Prohibition was in force in 1930.)

Nancy is depicted as intentionally hiding stolen evidence (the clock) from the police, and gunfire is involved in the police-robber chase. A climactic scene, inserted before the denouement and epilogue, has Nancy delighted to take the money from the Tophams and see it distributed to destitute family and friends.

=== 1959 revision ===
In the Harriet Adams rewrite, Nancy is eighteen, not sixteen, and is also depicted as a less impulsive, less headstrong girl of Edward Stratemeyer's and Mildred Benson's vision, to a milder, more sedate and refined girl— "more sugar and less spice", with an extensive wardrobe and a more charitable outlook. Helen now appears older, perhaps in preparation for her eventual "write-out" after Volume 4 of the revised series (no explanation is made in the original series) to introduce Bess and her cousin George. Readers have noted two figures illustrated in the same vein as the cousins appear in a 1959 illustration at a girls' camp). Racial stereotypes are omitted. Action is increased significantly and is faster-paced. Greater detail is given to develop Nancy and her home.

Relatives of Josiah Crowley are concerned that the selfish nouveau riche social-climbing heirs presumptive, the snobbish Tophams, have taken him into their home and do not let him visit other family members, including the Turner and Hoover sisters. When Crowley dies, promises of being included in his will appear moot as the will, held by the Tophams, leaves everything to them. Nancy is prompted to help the Crowley kin by her affection for Crowley's distant niece, little Judy, who is being raised by the elderly Turner sisters.

While looking for the Hoover sisters, Nancy happens upon their farm during a downpour and shelters with them to dry off because her convertible top malfunctioned. In the original version, the sisters wanted to improve their hatchery and dressmaking skills; here, Allison Hoover wants to take singing lessons.

Nancy's encounter with the undeserving Topham sisters now centers around a torn evening dress instead of a broken vase, as in the original story. Nancy catches up with the thieves when they stop to dine, instead of drinking illegal-era alcohol.

The final scene, the reading of the actual will that disinherits the Tophams, focuses on the delight of rewarding the deserving Crowley kin, instead of Nancy's desire to down-class the snobbish Topham family.

== Artwork ==
The 1930s edition was published with the white-spine dust jacket, with artwork by Russell H. Tandy, and four glossy black-and-white interior illustrations, also by Tandy. The first edition is readily distinguished from later editions by its lack of a silhouette on the front cover, and blank end pages. However, a few printings occurred (through 1932) before these trademarks were added to the series.

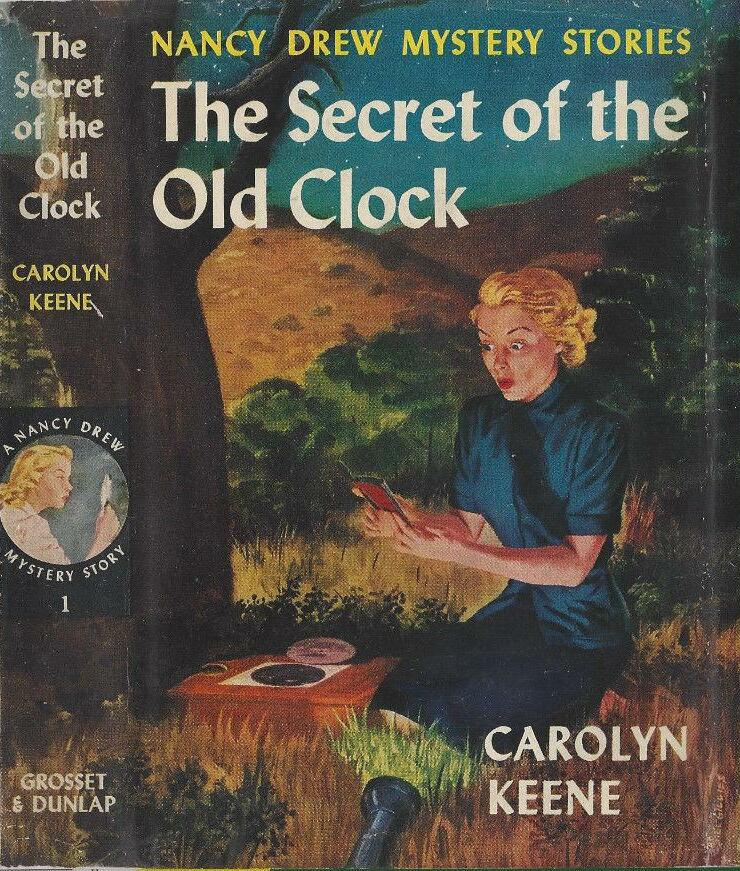
1950 cover art by Bill Gillies

In 1937, three of the illustrations were eliminated, leaving only a frontispiece, and additional information and illustration were added to the dust jacket. In 1943, the interior frontispiece art was updated to conform to current 1940s style. In 1950, the dust jacket was revamped as a wraparound jacket, with the picture continuing onto the spine of the book, and with cover art by Bill Gillies that was more in keeping with 1950s style. Gillies' Nancy, modeled after his wife, looks more mature than 16 (her age in the text at the time). She wears a 1950s version of her early trademark blue suit, and is kneeling so that the length, width, and general style are indeterminate, leaving the art less dated. The scene does not exactly match the text in the story.

When the text was rewritten in 1959, five illustrations were added. The new text described the cover scene in detail. In 1960, this volume was given entirely new artwork, including eight ink drawings and a color frontispiece, which served as the jacket illustration, all by Polly Bolian, for the Reader's Club (Cameo) edition.

In 1962, the publisher eliminated dust jackets and the books were issued with the art directly on the cover with yellow spines and backs using Bill Gillies' artwork.

In 1965, the cover art was updated with an illustration by Rudy Nappi, featuring the same dress Nancy wears on Gillies' cover for The Secret of the Wooden Lady. The internal illustrations remained intact and unchanged. While binding and spine designs have changed, the book's cover, all art (except endpapers) and text remain unchanged.

== Copyright status ==
In the United States, the original text entered the public domain in 2026 (95 years after it was first published), while the revised text will not enter the US public domain until January 1, 2055. In countries with a life of author +70 years rule, the original text will pass into the public domain on January 1, 2073, because of Mildred Wirt Benson’s death in 2002, and the revised text of The Secret of the Old Clock will pass into the public domain on January 1, 2053, as Harriet Adams died in 1982.

== Adaptations ==
The 12th installment in the Nancy Drew point-and-click adventure game series by Her Interactive, named Nancy Drew: Secret of the Old Clock, is loosely based on the novel and also incorporate elements from The Hidden Staircase, The Bungalow Mystery, and The Mystery at Lilac Inn.

The story of the episode "The Curse of the Dark Storm" from the Nancy Drew television series is inspired by the novel. In the episode, Nancy and Ned find a clock hidden by Tiffany Hudson. The clock holds what Tiffany wanted Ned to have following her death.

In 2026, Marci Kay Monson and Ryan Wheatcroft respectively retold and illustrated The Secret of the Old Clock as part of publisher Gibbs Smith's Mini Mysteries, a children's book series that faithfully retells classic mystery novels for modern readers 4 to 8 years old. Monson's retelling—titled The Secret of the Old Clock: A Nancy Drew Detective Story—was distributed by Simon & Schuster.
