= The Bungalow Mystery =

Nancy Drew 4, published 1930

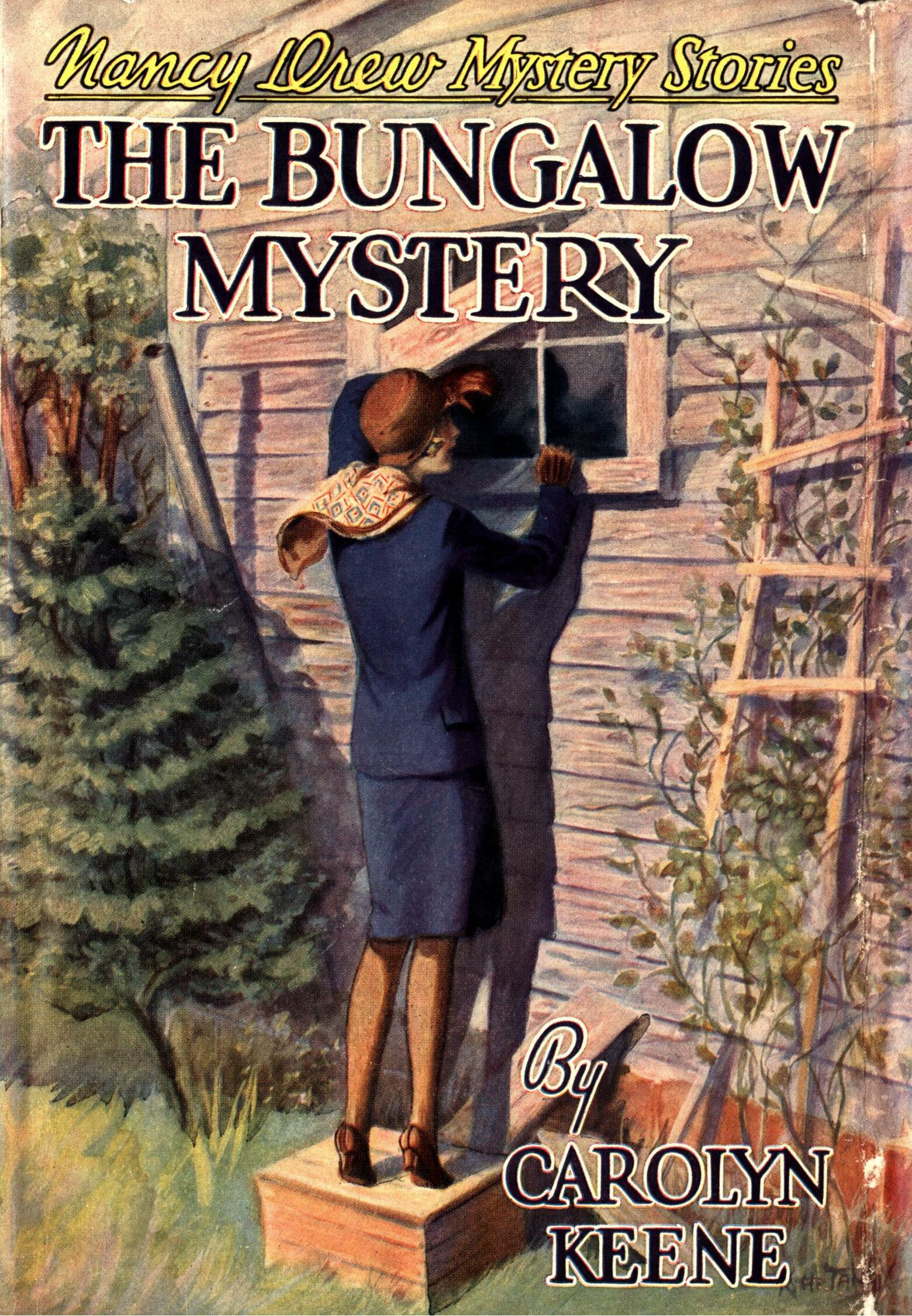
- Original edition cover
- Author: Carolyn Keene
- Original title: Nancy Drew Mystery Series #3
- Illustrator: Russell H. Tandy
- Series: Nancy Drew Mystery Stories
- Genre: Juvenile literature
- Publisher: Grosset & Dunlap
- Publication date: April 29, 1930 (original); December 1, 1960 (revised edition)
- Publication place: United States
- Media type: Print (Hardback & Paperback)
- Pages: 210 (1930–1959); 180
- ISBN: 0-448-09503-3
- OCLC: 19117010
- Preceded by: The Hidden Staircase
- Followed by: The Mystery at Lilac Inn

The Bungalow Mystery is the third volume in the Nancy Drew Mystery Stories series written under the pseudonym Carolyn Keene. It was the last of three books in the "breeder set" trilogy, released in 1930, to test-market the series.

It was the final volume edited by Edward Stratemeyer before his death. His daughter, Harriet Stratemeyer Adams, extensively revised the novel in 1960.

== Plot summaries ==
=== 1930 edition ===
Laura Pendleton rescues Nancy Drew and her friend Helen, who can't swim, when their rowboat capsizes during a sudden, severe storm on Moon Lake. The girls from River Heights befriend the orphaned Laura, who has come to the area to meet her new guardian, Jacob Aborn. Mr. Aborn seems somewhat boorish to the River Heights girls, and Nancy, upon returning home, receives a phone call from Laura, who is desperate to escape from her "evil" guardian. He expects her to do household chores and cook, which seems natural, but when he demands her furs and jewels, she calls Nancy for help. Laura escapes, and this leads Nancy back to the Aborn house, spying on a mysterious bungalow in the woods that he frequents. Nancy eventually enters the bungalow but is quickly captured by Stumpy Dowd. He ties her up, intending to leave her there. However, she soon escapes, exposing an impostor who had intended to steal all of Laura's stocks and investments, as well as her jewels.

=== 1960 revision ===
The plot is similar, but the mystery takes longer to develop; unusual, in that revised versions of Nancy Drew typically reduce detail and speed up the action. Nancy and Helen meet Laura after she rescues them on the lake; the girls are on vacation while Helen and her aunt plan the former's upcoming wedding. The girls meet Laura's guardians, Mr. and Mrs. Jacob Aborn, more dramatically: Bleached-haired Mrs. Aborn arrives at the hotel in disarray after having a flat tire in the same storm that caught the girls on the lake. Nancy finds the Aborns gauche but friendly. Nancy is called home to aid injured Hannah Gruen; as in the original, she encounters a tree on the road, but this time a brother and sister appear, and help her.

Upon returning home, Nancy looks after Hannah and takes over the housekeeping chores. Carson Drew assigns her to investigate a long list of individuals suspected of involvement in investment-securities fraud. Nancy tackles this by dressing more maturely (the first time she implements an appearance change to sleuth in the series chronology) and going door-to-door for charity as a ruse to meet the suspects. This subplot adds time and depth to the story.

Laura contacts Nancy surreptitiously to ask for her help, and then escapes from her locked room at the Aborn residence to seek refuge at the Drews'. Mrs. Aborn had ordered Laura to hand over valuable jewels, but she carried them to Nancy's house.

The rest of the mystery unfolds similarly to the 1930 edition, although Nancy fixes Laura up on a date with her friend Don Cameron, and she goes to investigate the Aborn lake house under the ruse of being on vacation back at the same hotel from the opening chapters. A feature fixture that appears vaguely in other volumes is introduced here: Nancy carries a suitcase in her trunk that contains clothing appropriate for outdoor wear, an evening dress with accessories, and swimwear, plus cosmetics, etc. The main difference in the new edition's final chapters is that the Aborns are acting as impostors together as a couple; Jacob Aborn's wife was on vacation and Stumpy closely resembled Jacob Aborn, allowing for the substitution. They are the couple Nancy couldn't locate in River Heights, who committed the banking crimes her father was investigating. Laura discovers that the real Aborns are wonderful people who would be caring guardians. To reward Nancy for helping her and rescuing her valuables, Laura presents the sleuth with her mother's favorite ring—an aquamarine, a reminder that their friendship began on water.

== Artwork ==
The original 1930 artwork—Nancy peeking into the abandoned bungalow—was created by Russell H. Tandy, who also designed the frontispiece and three internals for the original version. In 1937, the three internals were omitted. In 1943, Tandy executed a completely new pen-and-ink drawing for the frontispiece instead of updating earlier illustrations.

In 1950, Bill Gillies created new cover artwork, showing Nancy spying on Stumpy Dowd. This artwork was retained for the 1960 revision, which also added a frontispiece and five pen-and-ink internal illustrations.

In 1965, the cover was updated by Rudy Nappi to show Nancy dressed in a matronly dress, contrasting with the current "mod" look, and spying on the bungalow in the woods. These illustrations are all in print today.

== Reception ==
By 2000, The Bungalow Mystery had sold 1.5 million copies in the US market.

== Adaptations ==
The 12th installment in the Nancy Drew point-and-click adventure game series by Her Interactive, named Nancy Drew: Secret of the Old Clock, is loosely based on the novel and also incorporate elements from The Secret of the Old Clock, The Hidden Staircase, and The Mystery at Lilac Inn.

The elements from this story include the girl, Emily Crandall, who is the replacement character for Laura Pendleton; Emily's "questionable" guardian, Jane Willoughby (a culmination character of the fake Mr. and Mrs. Aborn), Emily's mother (who is named Gloria Crandall née Dowd in the game instead of Marie Pendleton), and Jim Archer, who is only a family friend instead of being Helen Corning's fiancé as in the revised version of the book. Gloria's maiden name Dowd is also a reference to the Dowds, who are the criminals in the book. Also, the style of Richard Topham's school is in the style of a bungalow. Finally, the storyline of this book is one of the two main stories in the game like Emily/Laura needing to protect her mother's jewels. The other one being the storyline from The Secret of the Old Clock.

A part of this book, the Road Construction sign and trying to cross the bridge with planks, was seen in the Hardy Boys Nancy Drew episode, "The Mystery of the Diamond Triangle".
