= Nancy Drew and the Hidden Staircase (2019 film) =

2019 American teen mystery comedy film

- Theatrical release poster
- Directed by: Katt Shea
- Written by: Nina Fiore; John Herrera
- Based on: Nancy Drew by Edward Stratemeyer; The Hidden Staircase by Carolyn Keene (Mildred Wirt Benson)
- Produced by: Ellen DeGeneres; Jeff Kleeman; Chip Diggins
- Starring: Sophia Lillis; Sam Trammell; Linda Lavin
- Cinematography: Edd Lukas
- Edited by: Richard Nord
- Music by: Sherri Chung
- Production companies: A Very Good Production; Red 56
- Distributed by: Warner Bros. Pictures
- Release date: March 15, 2019
- Running time: 89 minutes
- Country: United States
- Language: English
- Budget: $17 million
- Box office: $624,549

Nancy Drew and the Hidden Staircase is a 2019 American teen mystery comedy film, based on the book The Hidden Staircase by Carolyn Keene. It was directed by Katt Shea, with a screenplay by Nina Fiore and John Herrera, and served as a reboot of the Nancy Drew film series. The movie, produced by A Very Good Production and Red 56 and distributed by Warner Bros. Pictures, stars Sophia Lillis in the role of amateur detective Nancy Drew, as she investigates a haunted house. It also stars Zoe Renee, Mackenzie Graham, Laura Slade Wiggins, Sam Trammell, and Linda Lavin in supporting roles. The same book had been adapted for a film of the same title in 1939.

Nancy Drew and the Hidden Staircase was released in the United States on March 15, 2019, by Warner Bros. Pictures. The film received positive reviews from critics, despite being a box-office bomb.

== Plot ==
After her mother's death, 16-year-old sleuth Nancy Drew and her father Carson relocate from Chicago to rural River Heights. While she struggles to fit in, Carson is active in local politics, fighting the development of a train line through the town. A local thug named Willie Wharton threatens Nancy one night to try to scare her father into backing down.

A bully named Derek Barnes edits a video of Nancy's friend Bess to embarrass her. To get back at him, Nancy rigs his shower at the gym which dyes his whole body blue. Nancy embarrasses him in front of everyone and he runs out with his shirt off.

While performing community service as punishment for the prank, Nancy meets Flora, an elderly woman needing help with an apparent haunting in her home. Excited by the mystery, she stays overnight at Flora's home, along with Flora's niece Helen (who is also Derek's girlfriend). That night, strange things begin to happen, with lights going out and then exploding, cabinet doors and drawers opening, and a cloaked figure appearing and warning Nancy to give up her mystery.

The next day, Nancy believes that someone broke in and tried scaring them out. She and Helen investigate, and they find a secret passage that leads outside, revealing how the "ghost" entered the house. The secret passage also contains props the intruder used to simulate a haunting, such as a rigged fuse box to manipulate the lights in the house. The rest of the strange phenomenon is explained by a rig that emits concentrated nutmeg through the house's air conditioning, which triggers dangerous hallucinations.

Later, Nancy realizes her father, who is staying out of town on a business trip, has not checked in with her or her aunt Hannah recently. She calls her father's friend Nate, who tells her that Carson's meeting is at a campsite and reception must be spotty. Nancy is not convinced, as Carson had told her he would be staying at a hotel.

Worried that something has happened to her father, Nancy and Helen head to Carson's hotel. They discover that he never checked out, and his cell phone is still in his room. Security footage from the previous night reveals Carson was ambushed and kidnapped by Wharton. Nancy's friends Bess and George find out he is the same man who bought the nutmeg used at Flora's house, and Nancy realizes Carson is being kept in the secret passage there.

Nancy and Helen head to Flora's house, where they discover Wharton and Nate holding Carson and Flora hostage. It is revealed that Wharton and Nate were working together to sabotage the anti-train movement, and that they intended to force Flora to sell her house so the line could be built through her property. When Nancy's investigation proved that the house was not haunted, they were forced to use other means to secure the land. Nancy and Helen work together to save Carson and Flora from their captors, who are then arrested by the police.

The next day at school, Nancy, George, and Bess welcome Helen into their circle of friends, and together they plan their next adventure at the Lilac Inn.

== Cast ==
- Sophia Lillis as Nancy Drew
- Zoe Renee as George Fayne
- Mackenzie Graham as Bess Marvin
- Laura Slade Wiggins as Helen Corning
- Sam Trammell as Carson Drew
- Linda Lavin as Flora
- Andrea Anders as Hannah Gruen
- Jesse C. Boyd as Willie Wharton
- Jay DeVon Johnson as Sheriff Marchbanks
- Andrew Matthew Welch as Deputy Patrick
- Jon Briddell as Nate
- Josh Daugherty as Mr. Barnes
- Evan Castelloe as Derek

== Production ==
On April 20, 2018, it was reported that Sophia Lillis would star in the film adaptation of Nancy Drew and the Hidden Staircase, which would be produced by Ellen DeGeneres, Jeff Kleeman, and Chip Diggins for Warner Bros. Pictures. Wendy S. Williams served as executive producer. In June, other casting was announced which included Zoe Renee as George, Mackenzie Graham as Bess, Laura Slade Wiggins as Helen, Sam Trammell as Carson, Linda Lavin as Flora, and Andrea Anders as Hannah, along with Jay DeVon Johnson, Andrew Matthew Welch, Jon Briddell, Josh Daugherty, Evan Castelloe, and Jesse C. Boyd. Principal photography on the film took place that same month in Monroe, Georgia.

=== Music ===
The score of the film was composed by Sherri Chung. Emily Bear composed and sings the songs "More than Just a Girl" and "Daylight".

== Release ==
=== Marketing ===
On January 18, 2019, DeGeneres announced exclusively that the film would be released in theaters on March 15; she also debuted a trailer. On February 19, 2019, Warner Bros. Pictures released a short clip from the film. In addition, DeGeneres interviewed Lillis on her talk show to promote the film.

=== Box office ===
As of August 2020, Nancy Drew and the Hidden Staircase grossed $623,088 at the box office, and a further $322,939 with home video sales.

=== Critical response ===
On Rotten Tomatoes, the film has an approval rating of 76%, based on 25 reviews, with an average rating of 6/10. The website's consensus reads, "Elevated by a well-cast Sophia Lillis, Nancy Drew and the Hidden Staircase leads audiences into a genially entertaining new take on the venerable character." On Metacritic, the film has a score of 55 out of 100, based on reviews from 10 critics, indicating "mixed or average reviews".

Peter Debruge of Variety praised the "consistently clever script" saying it "isn't nearly as interested in the mystery as it is in Nancy Drew herself, or in the circle of characters and relationships that surround her. And that’s the smart way to approach such a case, since the movie was clearly intended to be more than a one-off." He also praises Lillis for her performance and says she is "the freshest thing to happen to Nancy Drew in decades, making it clear that casting was the solution that has so often eluded this series in its jump from page to screen in the past."

=== Accolades ===
Nancy Drew and the Hidden Staircase was nominated for Best DVD or Blu-ray Release at the 45th Saturn Awards.
