= Penny Parker =

Heroine of children's book series by Mildred Benson

The Penny Parker Mystery Stories
- Author: Mildred Benson
- Country: United States
- Language: English
- Genre: Detective; Mystery novel
- Publisher: Cupples & Leon
- Published: 1939–1947
- Media type: Print (Hardcover)
- No. of books: 17

Penny Parker Mystery Stories is a series of young adult mystery novels by Mildred A. Wirt, with 17 titles published by Cupples & Leon from 1939 to 1947. It served as an emulator to the popular Nancy Drew Mystery Stories that Wirt was then ghostwriting for the Stratemeyer Syndicate.

As of December 2022, the Penny Parker stories are in development with Shady Hill Films as a series of feature-length episodes called The Penny Parker Mysteries.

== Plot ==
Penny Parker is a 17-year-old high school student living in Riverview with her widowed father Anthony Parker, the owner and publisher of the local newspaper Riverview Star. Since her mother died when she was very young, Penny was raised by her father and housekeeper Mrs. Weems to develop a strong, plucky personality that they often try — mostly unsuccessfully — to rein in.

Penny often becomes embroiled into mysteries and adventure through her father's work, or out of her own curiosity. She is often aided by her best friend Louise Sidell, who holds a meeker personality, and occasionally Jerry Livingston or Salt Sommers who are, respectively, a reporter and photographer for her father's paper.

== Background ==
While initially publishing few short stories during her teen years, Mildred Wirt worked as a reporter since college, first working at The Daily Iowan under editor George Gallop. In 1928, she married Associated Press correspondent Asa Wirt. In addition to her work for the Stratemeyer Syndicate since 1926, Wirt published similar titles individually on her own accord. With some written under her own name and some under pseudonyms, these books afforded her the creative freedom not available from writing for the Stratemeyer series.

Between 1935 and 1939, Wirt authored eight one-off titles for publisher Cupples & Leon under their "Mystery Stories for Girls" banner. In 1939, Wirt launched her own series aimed at capitalizing on the success of Stratemeyer product Nancy Drew, for which she had ghostwritten all but three titles. While Parker and Drew share some core common traits, holding her own creative freedom allowed Wirt to incorporate more realistic elements absent from the Drew stories, such as Penny still attending high school and facing financial burden from her expensive habits and the upkeep of her unreliable car.

The series ended in 1947, the same year in which Wirt's husband died following a long illness. She came to favor Parker over all other series she wrote, including Nancy Drew. Her obituary quoted her as saying in 1993, "I always thought Penny Parker was a better Nancy Drew than Nancy is.".

=== Publishing History ===
Cupples & Leon published and distributed the series from its inception until the series ended. In 1958, the company reissued the first four books with new cover artwork, and light revisions from Wirt, who had since remarried George Benson. These revisions did not continue. Benson retired from writing novels after her second husband's death the following year, focusing on journalism and her interests in aviation and archaeology.

In 1980, when Wirt testified in a highly-publicized court case between the Stratemeyer Syndicate and Grosset & Dunlap, the latter was reportedly interested in either republishing or reviving the Penny Parker series should they lose the rights to publishing Nancy Drew (which had all been rewritten by the Syndicate by this point). However, since the publisher ultimately gained the right to keep the Drew titles originally published by them, these plans never came to fruition.

In 2010 to 2011, Halcyon Press reissued the complete 17-book series in Kindle format as The Penny Parker Mystery Series volumes I and II. In 2012, Wildside Press reprinted numbers 3–17 of the series in the Penny Parker Megapack. Individual titles are also available in Kindle format.

== Titles ==
1. Tale of the Witch Doll (1939, 1958)
2. The Vanishing Houseboat (1939, 1958)
3. Danger at the Drawbridge (1940, 1958)
4. Behind the Green Door (1940, 1958)
5. Clue of the Silken Ladder (1941)
6. The Secret Pact (1941)
7. The Clock Strikes Thirteen (1942)
8. The Wishing Well (1942)
9. Saboteurs on the River (1943)
10. Ghost Beyond the Gate (1943)
11. Hoofbeats on the Turnpike (1944)
12. Voice from the Cave (1944)
13. The Guilt of the Brass Thieves (1945)
14. Signal in the Dark (1946)
15. Whispering Walls (1946)
16. Swamp Island (1947)
17. The Cry at Midnight (1947)

There are extant notes for an 18th book, which was never completed.

== Characters ==
Penny Parker — a high-school student with a skill at reporting and getting involved in mystery. Her impulsiveness can get her into hot water. She is the daughter of Anthony Parker. She is introduced in Tale of the Witch Doll and appears in all seventeen books.

Anthony Parker — Penny's widowed father and the owner of The Riverview Star. He gives her much freedom but rather disapproves of her sleuthing. Introduced in Tale of the Witch Doll, he appeared in every book.

Mrs. Maude Weems — the Parker family housekeeper; since the death of Mrs. Parker, she has cared for Penny as her own. Like Penny's father, she disapproves of the girl's sleuthing. Mrs. Weems makes her first appearance in Tale of the Witch Doll and appears in fifteen other books.

Louise Sidell — Penny's "closest friend", Louise is more cautious and less athletic than her chum. Though often reluctant to join Penny, she almost always gives in. She enjoys teasing Penny about Jerry Livingston. Louise debuted in Tale of the Witch Doll and appears in sixteen books overall (all but Guilt of the Brass Thieves).

Jerry Livingston — a "crack reporter" on The Riverview Star, Jerry serves as a love interest for Penny. Showing up in fourteen books, Jerry's first appearance is a brief one in Tale of the Witch Doll.

Salt Sommers — a photographer on The Riverview Star and part-time airplane spotter, he is a good friend of Penny's. Salt appears in eleven books, debuting in Danger at the Drawbridge.

Mr. DeWitt (sometimes spelled Dewitt) — the Star's gruff but competent city editor. He is introduced in Tale of the Witch Doll and appears in thirteen books overall.

=== Character notes ===
- Penny and her father are the only members of the main cast to appear in every book. Salt misses six, Mr. DeWitt misses four, Jerry misses three, and Louise and Mrs. Weems each miss one.
- Salt is the only main cast member not introduced in the first book, Tale of the Witch Doll. He does not appear until the third installment of the series, Danger at the Drawbridge.
- Penny has blonde hair and blue eyes in most of the stories and is considered slim and athletic. However, she is said to have “auburn” hair in Saboteurs on the River. She is revealed to be fifteen years old in Voice from the Cave.
- Louise is a brunette, and described as plump. Her age is never revealed.
- In Danger at the Drawbridge, Salt is described as having a deep scar on his left cheek.
- In Saboteurs on the River, Louise says she is going to be a nurse.
- Louise has a younger brother, Ted, who is only mentioned in the first book.
- Jerry is absent for two books (Hoofbeats on the Turnpike and Signal in the Dark) on military leave. Though it is not explicitly stated, it is presumed that he is also on leave during The Guilt of the Brass Thieves, considering the succession of the books.
