= Kay Tracey =

Book series featuring girl detective

- Cover of The Strange Echo, 1934
- Author: Frances K. Judd
- Language: English
- Series: The Kay Tracey Mystery Stories
- Genre: Mystery
- Publisher: Cupples & Leon
- Publication date: 1934-1942
- Publication place: United States
- Media type: Print
- Pages: 206

The Kay Tracey Mysteries were published under the name Frances K. Judd, a house pseudonym of the Stratemeyer Syndicate, a book packager. The series was conceived as a response to the popularity of the Nancy Drew Mystery Stories and likewise features a teenage girl detective. While the original entries in the series lasted only from 1934 to 1942, the books were updated, revised, and have been re-issued numerous times, most recently by Bantam Books in the 1980s, and have been translated into Swedish and French. Many critics see Kay Tracey as markedly inferior to Nancy Drew, but some find the series to be significant as one of a number of series that provided girls with a feminist role model prior to third-wave feminism.

== Character ==
Kay Tracey is a 16-year-old amateur sleuth who lives with her mother and her older cousin Bill, a lawyer, in the fictional town of Brantwood. Kay is depicted as unfailingly intelligent and courageous; she lives in "a constant shower of praise." Unlike Nancy Drew, the character on whom Kay Tracey was modeled, Kay is a student in Carmont High School. Like the Dana Girls, fictional sister sleuths created by the Stratemeyer Syndicate around the same time as Kay Tracey, Kay deals continually with a jealous schoolmate, Ethel Eaton, who often interferes in Kay's cases. Kay is often aided in solving mysteries by her two best friends, twins Wilma and Betty Worth, and occasionally her boyfriend, Ronald Earle.

== Series history ==
Written by four women from 1934 to 1942, the Kay Tracey Mystery Stories were created in order to capitalize on the success of the Nancy Drew Mystery Stories. The series has been reprinted numerous times, often with changes in artwork, format, and series numbering. The series was most recently re-issued in the 1980s.

=== Authorship ===
Meet clever Kay Tracey, who, though only sixteen, solves mysteries in a surprising manner. Working on clues which she assembles, this surprising heroine evolves the solution to cases that have baffled professional sleuths.

From the jacket to The Shadow on the Door, 1934

The series was created and supervised by Harriet Stratemeyer Adams, with the actual stories being written by four women over the series' history: Elizabeth Mildred Duffield Ward, Mildred Wirt Benson, Edna Stratemeyer Squier (Adams's sister), and Anna Perot Rose Wright. Ward was responsible for the first two titles in the series; volumes three through 12 as well as volume 14 were written by Benson. Wright wrote the last four volumes. While Squier contributed only one volume, The Forbidden Tower (later dropped from the series), she wrote the plot outlines for nearly all the volumes in the series.

Adams and Squier exercised tight control over the series, ensuring that all outlines were extremely detailed. At one point Benson cited this level of detail as a reason for the abrupt writing style of some of the titles, writing to Adams that "I do think that the last Kay Tracey story had a slightly hurried and abrupt tone, although I spent fully as much time and thought on the manuscript as usual.... Recent plots seem to be running somewhat long on detail, and I had difficulty in getting all of the scenes into the story even by cutting some of them short." Adams and Squier continued, however, to supervise every detail of the books; in particular, they expressed concern over the way that Benson characterized the title heroine and her friends. As Squier wrote to Benson at one point, "Kay and her chums at times speak too sarcastically and audaciously for growing girls. The story has a boyish ring throughout which we will temper to conform to more girlish ideals."

=== Publication history ===
The Kay Tracey Mystery Stories have been reprinted multiple times in a number of different formats and with different artwork. The series was originally published by Cupples & Leon. These editions featured a glossy frontispiece and a full color illustration on a yellow dustjacket. Later runs of the dustjackets were red and blue as well as yellow.

The series was later updated and revised, first in 1951 and 1952 by Doubleday's Garden City Books, although the only title to be substantially re-worked was the first volume, The Secret of the Red Scarf. During this time, wrap-around style dust jackets, that is, jackets where the cover art continued over to the spine, in full-color, were introduced. A new frontispiece in pen-and-ink was included. A spine symbol of Kay, apparently cheering, was introduced on the jackets, as was a binding symbol on the book spine, which was a picture of Kay peeking from behind a curtain. The volumes were slightly revised in most cases, mainly to updated slightly outmoded vernacular, and to re-sequence the books. Three titles – The Forbidden Tower, The Mystery of the Swaying Curtains, and The Shadow on the Door – were dropped from the series for reasons which are unclear.

The series was re-issued in digest size paperbacks by Doubleday/Books, Inc. in the late 1950s, and the titles were again re-sequenced. From 1960 to 1964, eight titles were released by Berkley Medallion/Berkley Highland in paperback. Six books were released in 1978 by Lamplight in picture cover format with artwork very similar to the Garden City books. In the 1980s, Bantam re-issued six of the titles in the series (re-numbered again), and at least seven titles were printed in the United Kingdom in 1984, again with new artwork.

=== Titles ===
The Kay Tracey Mystery Stories were renumbered repeatedly; below is a complete list of volumes in original publication order with the original numbering by Cupples & Leon. A 19th and 20th titles were planned for the series, but never came to fruition, as the series was canceled in 1942.

- 1. The Secret of the Red Scarf, 1934
- 2. The Strange Echo, 1934
- 3. The Mystery of the Swaying Curtains, 1935
- 4. The Shadow on the Door, 1935
- 5. The Six-Fingered Glove Mystery, 1936
- 6. The Green Cameo Mystery, 1936
- 7. The Secret at the Windmill, 1937
- 8. Beneath the Crimson Briar Bush, 1937
- 9. The Message in the Sand Dunes, 1938
- 10. The Murmuring Portrait, 1938
- 11. When the Key Turned, 1939
- 12. In the Sunken Garden, 1939
- 13. The Forbidden Tower, 1940
- 14. The Sacred Feather, 1940
- 15. The Lone Footprint, 1941
- 16. The Double Disguise, 1941
- 17. The Mansion of Secrets, 1942
- 18. The Mysterious Neighbors, 1942

== Critical assessment ==
While the Kay Tracey books were intended to be similar to the Nancy Drew series, Kay Tracey was never as popular a character as Nancy Drew. Various critics have attempted to explain how a series so superficially similar should have been so much less successful.

Some commentators have cited the stories themselves and the style in which they were written as a reason for the series' comparative lack of success. The series is written at a much more break-neck pace than other series books of the time; their style has been called "formula-writing at its most flaccid." Others have compared the series to comic books, arguing that the stories are "lurid, but too cartoonish to be frightening."

Others have pointed to the character of Kay Tracey herself. The character has been described as much less focused than Nancy Drew on rational detective methods. While a Nancy Drew mystery at least "tells readers that Nancy works by logical reasoning," Kay "lurches from coincidence to happenstance." Some call Kay a "Nancy Drew imposter." Anne Macleod and others argue that the series was less long-lasting than Nancy Drew, despite its superficial similarities, because "the stories fail to support the kind of authority and autonomy that Nancy enjoys without question." Kay lacks her own car, but must instead borrow her cousin Bill's, and her authority is "undercut by her clear identification as a schoolgirl." Kay lives with her mother, not her father; while Kay's mother does not interfere in Kay's mystery-solving, she "carries non-interventionism to the point of idiocy" and fails to provide the series with the cachet that Carson Drew provided for Nancy.

In general, however, critics often see Kay Tracey as simply one of a number of girls' series that are important because they provided girl readers with role models, particularly girls who grew up before third-wave feminism.
