= The Clue of the Velvet Mask =

Nancy Drew 30, published 1953

- Author: Carolyn Keene
- Language: English
- Series: Nancy Drew Mystery Stories
- Genre: Juvenile literature
- Publisher: Grosset & Dunlap
- Publication date: 1953, 1969
- Publication place: United States
- Media type: Print (hardback & paperback)
- Pages: 192 pp
- ISBN: 0-448-09530-0
- OCLC: 38500097
- Preceded by: The Mystery at the Ski Jump
- Followed by: The Ringmaster's Secret

The Clue of the Velvet Mask is the thirtieth volume in the original Nancy Drew Mystery Stories series. It was Mildred Benson's final ghostwrite for the series. The plot and story take place largely in Nancy's hometown of River Heights. Nancy tries to solve a mystery about a gang of event thieves robbing homes during parties, lectures, musicals, and other social occasions planned or catered by Lightner's Entertainment Company. Much of the original story contains elements of dramatic crime dramas; the villains are darker in tone than many other entries in the series.

== Plot summary - 1953 edition ==
As the story opens, Nancy and friends attempt to thwart suspicious, masked party-goers from reaching valuable objets d'art on display. At the party, Nancy finds an odd, black velvet hood, which she retains as a clue; most of the guests are wearing simpler, smaller masks as the evening is very warm. Her acquaintance, Linda, who is an employee of the Lightner company, is suspected of wrongdoing. At subsequent Lightner events, Nancy encounters other thieves, and is nearly suffocated by an evil pair of crooks. Nancy and George rent wigs to switch identities; however, George is kidnapped, her disguise removed, is put under the influence of hypnotic, mind-altering drugs, and threatened. This results in a timid, frightened characterization; paralyzed by fear, George refuses to help in the investigation and urges Nancy to stop.

Nancy focuses on the executive assistant at Lightner's, Mr. Tombar, while she attempts to decode mysterious numbers written on the lining of the mask. She realizes that the numbers actually mark dates of events at which robberies took place, and starts attending each event in person as detective and as favor to Mr. Lightner. She encounters thieves at a wedding, a musicale, where they nearly smother her, and a lecture. Finally, Nancy attends another masquerade as a coat-check girl, and she stops a robbery in process, capturing a female member of the gang. She and Bess investigate the ramshackle Blue Iris Inn in the nearby countryside, trying to find out why Peter Tombar owns the property and what secrets it hides. On a hunch, she and Bess take an impromptu visit while talking with the recovering George Fayne, and fall victim to the evil Velvet gang. They are grabbed by two of the men. Both the girls scream, but the men clap hands over their mouths. The prisoners are dragged into the cellar, and bound and gagged. Only paranoid George knows where they are, and can identify the clothing last worn by Nancy. She must overcome her mental breakdown and get on the case when the girls fail to return.

Crime noir elements feature heavily in this book, and Ned Nickerson is prominently featured as a true partner in crime solving. Nancy is accosted by a woman in the opening chapters, comes face to face with a thief at a wedding reception, and is nearly suffocated when a pair of thieves wrap her face-down in a bedspread. George Fayne is drugged and a victim of criminal threat, and Ned is involved in two physical confrontations as well. Finally, Nancy and Bess are kidnapped, blindfolded, and abused verbally (this refers to an out-of-print version of the story).

== 1969 revision ==
Nancy's haircolor is changed to titian, George's from black to brown, and the story eliminates subplots and extraneous descriptive vocabulary, including non-essential scenes and passages, including descriptive and humorous passages where Nancy works undercover as a file clerk and finds the work unappealing. Additionally, the revised version removes questionable (in 1969) descriptive elements of George's drugged status and hypodermics. Strangely, the revision also eliminates the importance of George's recovery; although she leads investigators to the scene of the kidnapping, Mr. Drew is nearly as instrumental in finding Nancy as George. Nancy and Bess have been caught spying by the Velvet gang, and are bound and gagged, helpless prisoners. George's discovery of a dress button Nancy has planted at the scene is downplayed. In the original version, Nancy has changed clothes, so only George knows what Nancy and Bess were wearing when they disappeared.

== Other editions ==
This book was the first promotional release for the 1959 debut of the Nancy Drew Reader's Club. The covers of volumes released in this group are two-toned pastels, featuring full color jackets and frontispieces, as well as eight double-page drawings by artist Polly Bolian. Bolian depicts Nancy as a strawberry-blond, but with the short tousled "Audrey Hepburn" hairstyle worn by many young women at the time, and tailored, preppy 1950s ensembles. These editions had internal references to other volumes removed, and contain no clues of sequencing. Bolian adapts, with less action, the same scene as the original frontispiece, for the cover art; Nancy and Bess, in vivid 1950s shirtwaist dresses, spy on Mr. Tombar from a ruined garden.

== Artwork ==
The original volume was published in 1953, and was the first book to feature cover art by the artist Rudy Nappi. Nappi would go on to illustrate the covers of many Hardy Boys and all of the Nancy Drew series from 1953 to 1979. During his long term of employment, Nappi eventually updated cover artwork for books he originally illustrated. The original artwork shows Nancy in a conservative Spanish dancer's gown, on a mansion terrace. She is watching a man climb a trellis, while a masquerade is depicted through the French windows of the house. This art was also used on picture cover editions, from 1962 to 1969. The only interior illustration, the frontispiece, shows Nancy and Bess about to be kidnapped while spying at the Blue Iris Inn.

The cover of the 1969 revised version, still in print, depicts Nancy carrying the accessories from her costume, underneath a large image of a head wearing the black velvet domino. This edition also contains five plain pen and ink illustrations.

The "capture" scene frontispiece, from the original 1953 edition, was chosen by several book-binding companies to be used as the cover illustration on re-bound or library bound editions of many Nancy Drew titles.

Note: This is a condensed plot synopsis of separate print editions of a novel; all information referenced in this article comes directly from the source material. Mildred Benson is credited as the author on her Wikipedia page.
