= Mildred Benson =

American writer (1905–2002)

Mildred Wirt Benson
- Benson in the late 1990s
- Born: Mildred Augustine; July 10, 1905; Ladora, Iowa, United States
- Died: May 28, 2002 (aged 96); Toledo, Ohio, United States
- Education: University of Iowa
- Occupations: Writer; Journalist
- Spouses: Asa A. Wirt (m. 1928; died 1947) George Benson (m. 1950; died 1959)
- Children: 1
- Writing career
- Pen name: Carolyn Keene; Alice B. Emerson; Frances K. Judd; Joan Clark
- Years active: 1925–2002
- Genres: Children's fiction Mystery
- Notable work: Nancy Drew
- Notable awards: Agatha Award

Mildred Augustine Wirt Benson (July 10, 1905 – May 28, 2002) was an American journalist and writer of children's books. She wrote some of the earliest Nancy Drew mysteries and created the detective's adventurous personality. Benson wrote under the Stratemeyer Syndicate pen name Carolyn Keene from 1929 to 1953 and contributed to 23 of the first 30 Nancy Drew mysteries, which were bestsellers.

== Early life ==
Mildred Benson was born Mildred Augustine on July 10, 1905, in Ladora, Iowa, to Lillian and Dr. J. L. Augustine. Benson earned her degree in English from the University of Iowa in 1925 in just three years. She later returned to the university, and in 1927, became the first student there to earn a master's degree in journalism.

== Writing career ==
Benson began her career selling short stories to magazines such as St. Nicholas and Lutheran Young Folks. During her college years, she worked at The Daily Iowan under editor George Gallup, and after receiving her undergraduate degree, for the society pages of the Clinton Herald.

In addition to her work with the Stratemeyer Syndicate, Benson wrote many other series both in her name and under other pseudonyms from the 1930s to the 1950s. She ultimately wrote under a dozen names and published more than 130 books. In 1930 and 1931, Benson wrote the Ruth Darrow series. Taking flying lessons and flying her own aircraft, Ruth wins a national cross-country race, lands on an aircraft carrier, helps the Forest Service in fighting forest fires, and alerts the Coast Guard of an immigrant-smuggling scheme. The series has been highlighted as unusual for its time, for both its generally authentic aeronautical lore, and the consistent and outspoken advocacy of women's abilities and mechanical competence.

From 1939 to 1947, Benson wrote the Penny Parker books, which were published under her own name. Parker was the daughter of a newspaper editor who sought to become a reporter herself, often becoming involved in mysteries and dangerous situations. Parker was modeled after both the Nancy Drew character and Benson herself, but Benson had creative control of the character and her stories that she did not have for the Nancy Drew series. Benson would later cite Parker as her favorite of the characters she wrote, and considered her to be "a better Nancy Drew than Nancy is."

Benson began working at the Toledo Blade in 1944, and continued there for 58 years. After the death of her second husband in 1959, Benson focused on journalism. In the 1990s, she began writing a weekly column for the Toledo Blade titled "On the Go". She continued this and writing obituaries full-time until a few months before her death.

=== Stratemeyer Syndicate ===
In the spring of 1926, literary publisher Edward Stratemeyer wrote an ad looking for ghostwriters for the Stratemeyer Syndicate. Benson applied, mentioning that she had plans to move to New York City, where Stratemeyer's offices were located. At his request, Benson sent Stratemeyer some of her work, with which he was impressed. While vacationing, she met Stratemeyer in New York in July and was offered to undertake the Ruth Fielding series. Under the pseudonym of Alice B. Emerson, Benson wrote Ruth Fielding and Her Great Scenario. Stratemeyer credited Benson's writing for reviving sales of the Fielding series.

Syndicate ghostwriters took the outlines supplied by Stratemeyer and wrote the novel based on that outline. After her initial meeting with Stratemeyer, Benson never saw him again; the work was done through correspondence. As with all Syndicate ghostwriters, under the terms of her contract, Benson was paid a flat fee of $125 to $250 for each Stratemeyer-outlined text, the equivalent of three months' pay for a newspaper reporter at that time. Ghostwriters signed away all rights to their texts and any claim to the Syndicate pseudonym used. Writers were, however, permitted to reveal that they wrote for the Syndicate. The Syndicate protected their pseudonyms to preserve series continuity as contributors to the series came and went.

In 1929, Stratemeyer developed a new series of detective novels with Benson in mind as the ghostwriter. He initially named the heroine Stella Strong, though upon selling the series to Grosset & Dunlap, they chose the alternative name Nan Drew and lengthened the name to Nancy Drew. While Stratemeyer supplied the outlines of the first four novels for Benson, she developed Nancy's spunky, plucky personality, and her daring, adventurous spirit. Benson sought to make the heroine an unusually liberated woman for her time. She later said about writing the initial books, "I always knew the series would be successful. I just never expected it to be the blockbuster that it has been. I'm glad that I had that much influence on people."

Shortly after finishing work on The Mystery at Lilac Inn, and only a few weeks after the launch of the series, Stratemeyer died. Under the terms of his will, all Syndicate ghostwriters, including Benson, were sent one-fifth of the equivalent of the royalties the Syndicate had received for each book series to which they had contributed. Stratemeyer's daughters, Harriet Adams and Edna Stratemeyer, attempted to sell the company as per his wishes, but were unable to find a buyer due to the Great Depression. They ultimately continued their father's work, and kept correspondence with Benson. Though Benson briefly quit the Nancy Drew series, she continued writing the Fielding books until the series was cancelled by its publisher in 1934. Upon returning to the Nancy Drew series in 1934, Adams and Stratemeyer convinced her to also write the Kay Tracey and Dana Girls series they had developed. The Dana Girls, which also used the Carolyn Keene pseudonym, had been written by The Hardy Boys ghostwriter Leslie McFarlane until he quit following the initial four books.

Benson continued writing for the Syndicate until the early 1950s, when the Syndicate underwent management changes. Beginning in 1959, Adams revised and updated the Nancy Drew books written by Benson. Adams also made changes to Nancy's personality that had been crafted by Benson, making her less assertive and spunky. In 1980, Grosset & Dunlap called Benson as a witness during a lawsuit against the Syndicate for contracting new titles with their competitor Simon & Schuster. Benson's testimony revealed her identity to the public as a contributor to the Nancy Drew mystery stories. After the death of her sister in 1973, Adams claimed she had written the series since her father's passing; she had received considerable publicity for this especially since both The Hardy Boys and Nancy Drew were adapted for television in the late 1970s. Since the revelation and subsequent research into Syndicate files, Benson has been acknowledged the creator of the original Nancy Drew along with Edward Stratemeyer. In 2001, Benson received a Special Edgar Award from the Mystery Writers of America for her contributions to the Nancy Drew series.

Benson's favorite Nancy Drew story was The Hidden Staircase, the second mystery in the series. Whenever asked, she would gladly autograph copies of the Nancy Drew books, but only the titles she actually wrote.

== Personal life ==
In 1928, she married Asa Wirt, a correspondent for the Associated Press. The couple had a daughter, Margaret "Peggy" Wirt, who was born in 1936. Asa Wirt died in 1947, following a long illness, during which Mildred took care of him. In 1950, she married George A. Benson, her editor at the Toledo Blade newspaper. He died in 1959.

Benson was also known as a great adventurer. She made numerous trips to Central America, witnessing archaeological excavations and visiting Mayan sites. After her second husband's death, Benson obtained her pilot's license, and continued flying for several years.

Benson died in Toledo at the age of 96 on May 28, 2002.

== Selected bibliography ==
=== Non-series ===
As Mildred A. Wirt or Mildred Benson:

- Sky Racers, 1935
- Carolina Castle, historical fiction within a frame story
- Courageous Wings, 1937
- Linda, 1940
- Pirate Brig, historical fiction, published 1950 by Scribners but written earlier.
- Dangerous Deadline, published by Dodd, Mead & Co. in 1950, a winner of the Boys' Life—Dodd, Mead Prize Competition, and reprinted by Scholastic Book Services.
- Quarry Ghost 1959, UK edition, 1960, Kristie at College

=== Ruth Darrow (as Mildred A. Wirt) ===
- 1 Ruth Darrow in the Air Derby, 1930
- 2 Ruth Darrow in the Fire Patrol, 1930
- 3. Ruth Darrow in Yucatán, 1931
- 4. Ruth Darrow in the Coast Guard, 1931

=== Madge Sterling (as Ann Wirt) ===
- 1. The Missing Formula, 1932
- 2. The Deserted Yacht, 1932
- 3. The Secret of the Sundial, 1932

=== A Mystery Book/Story for Girls series, Cupples & Leon (as Mildred A. Wirt) ===
- The Twin Ring Mystery, 1935
- The Clue at Crooked Lane, 1936
- The Hollow Wall Mystery, 1936
- The Shadow Stone, 1937
- The Wooden Shoe Mystery, 1938
- Through the Moon-Gate Door, 1938
- Ghost Gables, 1939
- Painted Shield, 1939

=== Penny Nichols (as Joan Clark) ===
- 1. Penny Nichols Finds a Clue, 1937
- 2. Penny Nichols and the Mystery of the Lost Key, 1936
- 3. Penny Nichols and the Black Imp, 1936
- 4. Penny Nichols and the Knob Hill Mystery, 1939

=== Penny Parker (as Mildred A. Wirt) ===
- 1. Tale of the Witch Doll, 1939
- 2. The Vanishing Houseboat, 1939
- 3. Danger at the Drawbridge, 1940
- 4. Behind the Green Door, 1940
- 5. Clue of the Silken Ladder, 1941
- 6. The Secret Pact, 1941
- 7. The Clock Strikes Thirteen, 1942
- 8. The Wishing Well, 1942
- 9. Saboteurs on the River, 1943
- 10. Ghost Beyond the Gate, 1943
- 11. Hoofbeats on the Turnpike, 1944
- 12. Voice from the Cave, 1944
- 13. Guilt of the Brass Thieves, 1945
- 14. Signal in the Dark, 1946
- 15. Whispering Walls, 1946
- 16. Swamp Island, 1947
- 17. The Cry at Midnight, 1947
- 18. Unpublished Title, would have been 1948

=== Connie Carl (as Joan Clark) ===
- 1. Connie Carl at Rainbow Ranch, 1939
- 2. Connie Carl on Skis, would have been 1939 (made into Penny Parker #4)
- 3. Untitled Third volume, would have been 1939

=== Dan Carter Cub Scout (as Mildred A. Wirt) ===
- 1. Dan Carter Cub Scout, 1949
- 2. Dan Carter and the River Camp, 1949
- 3. Dan Carter and the Money Box, 1950
- 4. Dan Carter and the Haunted Castle, 1951
- 5. Dan Carter and the Great Carved Face, 1952
- 6. Dan Carter and the Cub Honor, 1953

=== The Boy Scout Explorers series, Cupples & Leon (as Don Palmer) ===
- At Treasure Mountain, 1955
- At Emerald Valley, 1955
- At Headless Hollow, 1957

=== Stratemeyer Syndicate Series ===
==== Nancy Drew (as Carolyn Keene) ====
- 1. The Secret of the Old Clock, 1930
- 2. The Hidden Staircase, 1930
- 3. The Bungalow Mystery, 1930
- 4. The Mystery at Lilac Inn, 1930
- 5. The Secret at Shadow Ranch, 1931
- 6. The Secret of Red Gate Farm, 1931
- 7. The Clue in the Diary, 1932
- 11. The Clue of the Broken Locket, 1934
- 12. The Message in the Hollow Oak, 1935
- 13. The Mystery of the Ivory Charm, 1936
- 14. The Whispering Statue, 1937
- 15. The Haunted Bridge, 1937
- 16. The Clue of the Tapping Heels, 1939
- 17. The Mystery of the Brass-Bound Trunk, 1940
- 18. The Mystery at the Moss-Covered Mansion, 1941
- 19. The Quest of the Missing Map, 1942
- 20. The Clue in the Jewel Box, 1943
- 21. The Secret in the Old Attic, 1944
- 22. The Clue in the Crumbling Wall, 1945
- 23. The Mystery of the Tolling Bell, 1946
- 24. The Clue in the Old Album, 1947
- 25. The Ghost of Blackwood Hall, 1948
- 30. The Clue of the Velvet Mask, 1953

==== Kay Tracey (as Frances K. Judd) ====
- 3. The Mystery of the Swaying Curtains, 1935
- 4. The Shadow on the Door, 1935
- 5. The Six-Fingered Glove Mystery, 1936
- 6. The Green Cameo Mystery, 1936
- 7. The Secret at the Windmill, 1937
- 8. Beneath the Crimson Briar Bush, 1937
- 9. The Message in the Sand Dunes, 1938
- 10. The Murmuring Portrait, 1938
- 11. When the Key Turned, 1939
- 12. In the Sunken Garden, 1939
- 14. The Sacred Feather, 1940

==== Dana Girls (as Carolyn Keene) ====
- 5. The Secret at the Hermitage, 1936
- 6. The Circle of Footprints, 1937
- 7. The Mystery of the Locked Room, 1938
- 8. The Clue in the Cobweb, 1939
- 9. The Secret at the Gatehouse, 1940
- 10. The Mysterious Fireplace, 1941
- 11. The Clue of the Rusty Key, 1942
- 12. The Portrait in the Sand, 1943
- 14. The Clue in the Ivy, 1952
- 15. The Secret of the Jade Ring, 1953
- 16. Mystery at the Crossroads, 1954

==== Ruth Fielding (as Alice B. Emerson), a 30-book series ====
- 23. Ruth Fielding and her Great Scenario, 1927
- 24. Ruth Fielding at Cameron Hall, 1928
- 25. Ruth Fielding Clearing Her Name, 1929
- 26. Ruth Fielding in Talking Pictures, 1930
- 27. Ruth Fielding and Baby June, 1931
- 28. Ruth Fielding and Her Double, 1932
- 29. Ruth Fielding and Her Greatest Triumph, 1933
- 30. Ruth Fielding and Her Crowning Victory, 1934

==== Doris Force (as Julia K. Duncan), a four-book series ====
- 1. Doris Force at Locked Gates, 1931
- 2. Doris Force at Cloudy Cove, 1931
