= The Mystery at Lilac Inn =

Nancy Drew 4, published 1930

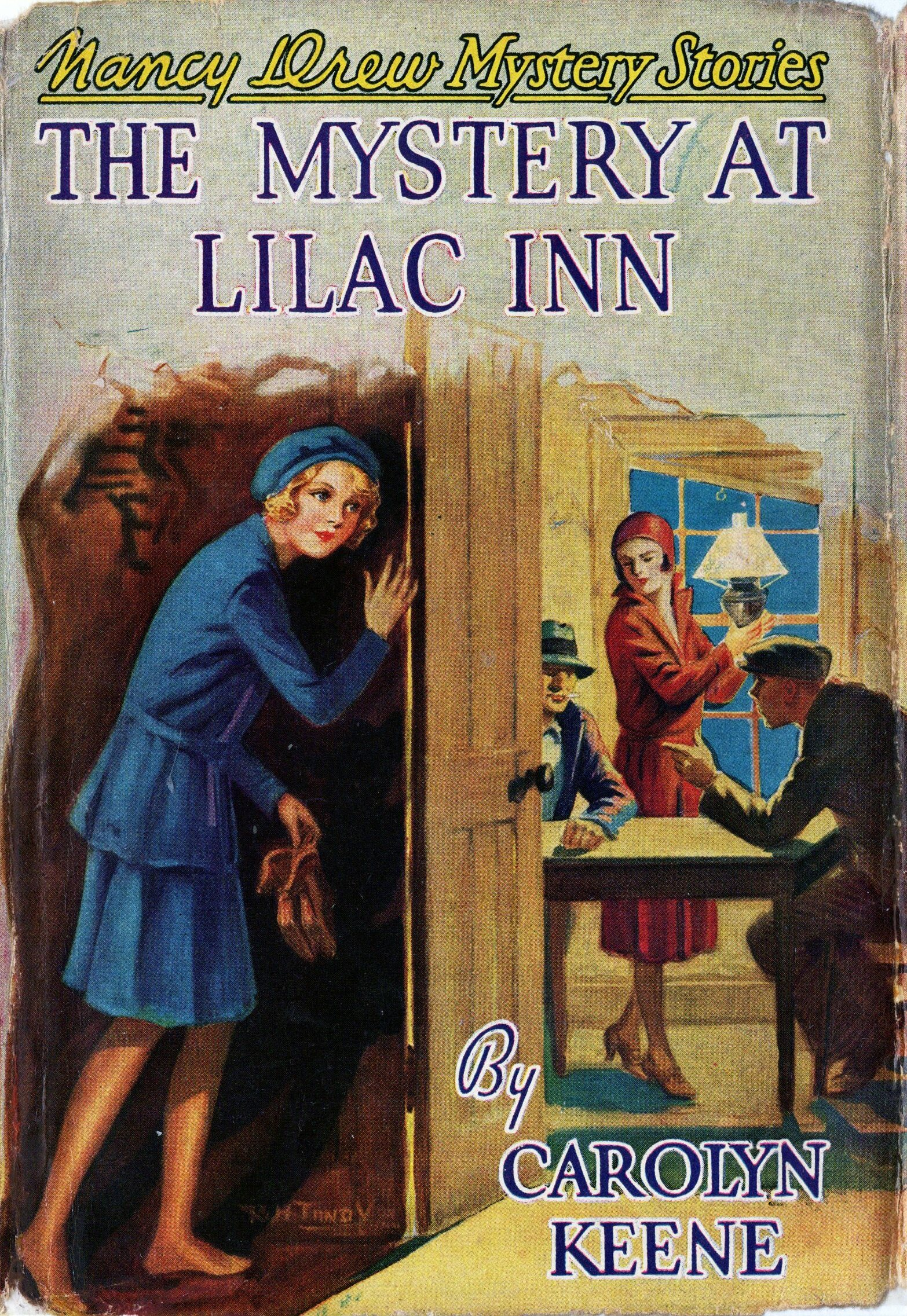
- Original edition cover
- Author: Carolyn Keene
- Illustrator: Russell H. Tandy
- Language: English
- Series: Nancy Drew Mystery Stories
- Genre: Juvenile literature
- Publisher: Grosset & Dunlap
- Publication date: October 1930 (original); 1961 (revised edition)
- Publication place: United States
- Media type: Print (hardback & paperback)
- Preceded by: The Bungalow Mystery
- Followed by: The Secret at Shadow Ranch
- Text: The Mystery at Lilac Inn at Wikisource

The Mystery at Lilac Inn is the fourth volume in the Nancy Drew Mystery Stories series. It was first published in 1930 under the pseudonym Carolyn Keene. Mildred Wirt Benson was the ghostwriter of the 1930 edition.

In 1961, Harriet Stratemeyer Adams extensively revised the novel, creating a completely different story. The original omitted the lead characters from much of the action, the titular inn was only a place where a crime was committed with minor investigatory follow-up, and a domestic help subplot was out of place in 1961. Ethnic slurs and opinions were removed.

== Plot summaries & controversy ==
=== 1930 edition ===
The story involves Nancy Drew helping her friend Emily Crandall find out who stole her heirloom jewels. Emily's guardian, Mrs. Jane Willoughby, unwisely removes them from a safe deposit box and carries them with her while lunching at Lilac Inn, only to have her handbag stolen while the diners are distracted by a car crash. In the meantime, Nancy must hire a temporary maid in the absence of Mrs. Gruen, her housekeeper. Nancy uncovers the thief, Mary Mason, one of the applicants for the position, as having been sent to Lilac Inn to seek employment, but not actually working there. Nancy finds the hideout of the crooks, but is caught. She is bound and gagged and left aboard the gang's sinking cabin cruiser to die, but is rescued by the river patrol. In the end, Nancy captures the jewel thief, exonerates the guardian, and returns her orphaned friend's fortune to her.

=== 1961 edition ===
Nancy Drew and her friend Helen are visiting Lilac Inn, recently renovated for Nancy's friend, Emily Willoughby's, wedding. Nancy discovers that an impersonator is forging her signature to rack up bills back in River Heights. Emily tells her that there have been sightings of apparitions in the lilac grove. Stood up for a scuba date with Emily's best man, Nancy is attacked while solo diving. Emily's inheritance is stolen during a blackout. Nancy experiences an explosion and cabin fire, an attack by the ghostly woman in the grove, and repeated negative interactions with inn staffer Maud Potter. Nancy impersonates the apparition only to come face to face with it, who looks just like Nancy. The ”apparition“ is revealed to be an actress looking for money at Lilac Inn and revenge on Nancy's father for putting her in jail. Like in the original, Nancy is captured by the gang, this time left tied up aboard a damaged submarine, but is again rescued by the harbor patrol.

=== Racism ===
The novel was extensively revised in 1961, partially due to elements of racism in the original novel. In the 1930 edition, Nancy uses racial stereotyping to describe potential replacement housekeepers whom she has rejected (they are black, Irish, and Scottish, respectively). Mary Mason, the antagonist, is described as an "impudent," "dark-complexioned" girl whom Nancy only realizes is involved in the crime after seeing her at an exclusive, upscale dress shop that Nancy frequents, where she comments, "Surely a girl in her circumstances cannot afford to buy dresses at such a place as this."

== Artwork ==
The book was printed with a navy jacket and four glossy illustrations, all by artist Russell H. Tandy.

In 1950, the cover art was updated with work by artist Bill Gillies. The text was completely rewritten by Harriet Stratemeyer Adams in 1961. The cover art was changed again to reflect the new story, this time by artist Rudy Nappi, and internal plain paper illustrations were added. Only the first two printings of this volume were available in a dust jacket. The book's text and artwork remained the same when the publisher switched to picture-cover illustrated binding editions in 1962.

R.H. Tandy illustrated Nancy spying on the criminals in the original cover art, along with a frontispiece and three internal illustrations showing various elements of the story. He updated the frontispiece in 1943. In 1950, the dust jacket art was changed to show an updated version of Nancy with the crooks behind her. This art was not retained for the story revision in 1961, as the scene is eliminated by a completely different story. Rudy Nappi illustrates a ghostly picture of two girls illuminated by glowing lights in the cuff of their long-sleeved gowns. (The 1961 cover art appears to feature both Nancy, facing, and a mysterious dark-haired girl. In actuality, Nancy has her back to the reader, and is the dark-haired girl in the foreground; the other girl is actually Nancy's impostor.)

== Adaptations ==
The 12th installment in the Nancy Drew point-and-click adventure game series by Her Interactive, named Nancy Drew: Secret of the Old Clock, is loosely based on the novel and also incorporate elements from The Secret of the Old Clock, The Hidden Staircase, and The Bungalow Mystery.

In the Nancy Drew television series, the Lilac Inn was renovated by Tiffany Hudson before her death.
