= The Hidden Staircase =

1930 book in the Nancy Drew Mystery Stories series

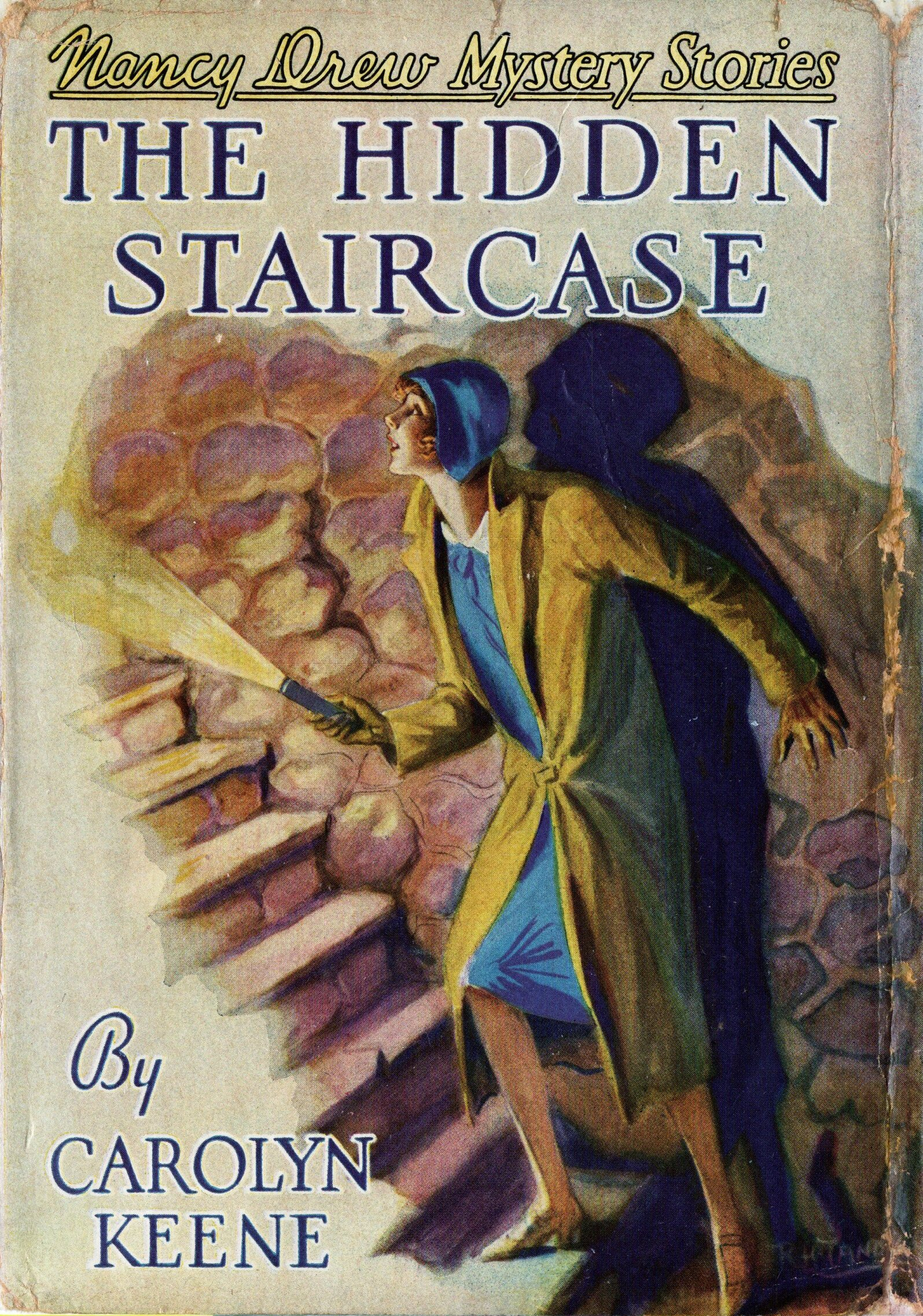
- The original dust jacket for The Hidden Staircase
- Author: Carolyn Keene
- Illustrator: Russell H. Tandy
- Cover artist: Russell H. Tandy
- Language: English
- Series: Nancy Drew Mystery Stories
- Genre: Mystery
- Publisher: Grosset & Dunlap
- Publication date: April 28, 1930 (original); May 15, 1959 (revised edition)
- Publication place: United States
- Media type: Print (hardback & paperback)
- Pages: 210(1930-1959); 180
- ISBN: 0-448-09502-5
- OCLC: 17335741
- Preceded by: The Secret of the Old Clock
- Followed by: The Bungalow Mystery

The Hidden Staircase is the second volume in the Nancy Drew Mystery Stories series written under the pseudonym Carolyn Keene, published in 1930 and revised in 1959. The original text was written by Mildred Wirt Benson, who said that it was her personal favorite of the Nancy Drew Books she wrote.

The novel was adapted as a Warner Bros. film, Nancy Drew and the Hidden Staircase, in 1939. Another adaptation of the book from Warner Bros. was released on March 15, 2019.

== Summaries ==
=== 1930 original edition, 25 chapters ===
At the beginning of the original edition of The Hidden Staircase Nancy is home alone while her father and their housekeeper, Hannah Gruen, are both out for the day. The doorbell rings and Nancy is introduced to the "rude visitor," Nathan Gombet, who has come to see Carson Drew about some papers. When his persistence irritates and insults Nancy, she grows impatient and angrily tells him to leave and threatens to call the police.

Soon after, Nancy is surprised at her house by Allie Horner, whom she aided in The Secret of the Old Clock. Allie knows Nathan Gombet by reputation because he tried to steal eggs from her farm. When Carson Drew arrives home, he explains his history with Gombet: Gombet signed over his land to build a railroad and then decided after the construction that he had been cheated out of money.

The following day, Abigail Rowen introduces Nancy to the Turnbull sisters, Rosemary and Floretta. They ask Nancy to help them learn the cause of the mysterious "hauntings" of their mansion in Cliffwood, several miles from River Heights. The sisters explain that numerous valuable items have gone missing from their Civil War-era mansion, but they cannot understand how any person could have entered the locked home during these different instances to commit the thefts.

After a gap of a few days in which Nancy visits with Helen Corning (a recurring friend in the earliest books in the series) Nancy stays overnight with the Turnbull sisters for a week to determine the source of their problems. She goes alone and has her own bedroom. Before she leaves, her father gives her a revolver from his desk to protect herself. He explains that he will be out of town on business in Chicago for a few days but no more than a week. They decide that when he knows the day of his arrival back in River Heights, Nancy will pick him up at the train station to discuss her findings at the Turnbull mansion.

Before Nancy leaves for Cliffwood, she receives a threatening letter telling her to stay away from the Turnbull mansion. While she is there more items are stolen and at one point they find a couple of canaries flying about the mansion. When Nancy notices a stone mansion across a hill which is almost identical to the Turnbull Mansion, the Turnbull sisters tell her that both mansions were built at the same time by distant relatives of theirs, two brothers who eventually became rivals during the Civil War. Likewise, they explain that none other than Nathan Gombet owns the other stone mansion, and he has even asked to purchase their house.

Armed with this knowledge, Nancy is certain that Nathan Gombet is the culprit behind the thefts and is determined to prove it. Meanwhile, her father, who sent a telegram to Nancy to pick him up on a certain day at the station for their meeting, disembarks to find Nathan Gombet waiting for him. Nathan confuses Carson and leads him to believe that Nancy has had an accident near Gombet's mansion and is waiting there, in trouble. Distraught and believing Gombet, Carson Drew rides back to Gombet's mansion, where he is then held prisoner. Nancy never receives the telegram from Carson Drew and worries that something is wrong since she cannot reach him.

Late one night, once the Turnbull sisters are asleep, and convinced that there is some passage between the two mansions, Nancy ventures out to Gombet's mansion in the dark, rainy night, armed with her revolver and a flashlight. While she is running through the rain, she sees Gombet walking toward the Turnbull mansion. She decides that this is her only opportunity to get into his house and resists her urge to follow him.

After sneaking through a cellar window of Gombet's house, Nancy is almost discovered twice by his servant. Upon the second search by Gombet's servant, Nancy is narrowly saved from discovery but ends up locked in an upstairs room. In the closet of this room, Nancy finds a knob and after pulling it, discovers a hidden staircase. The stone staircase, as it turns out, leads to a large tunnel that splits off at various points, all of which lead into different rooms in the Turnbull mansion.

The next morning, Nancy and the Turnbull sisters go to the sheriff, who brings the police force to Gombet's mansion. They find Nathan Gombet and the cell where he is holding Carson Drew as prisoner and arrest Gombet.

=== 1959 revised edition, 20 chapters ===
At the beginning of The Hidden Staircase, Nancy's friend Helen Corning calls her about a possible mystery to be solved. Helen introduces Nancy to Mrs. Flora Turnbull and Mrs. Rosemary Hayes. Helen is the great-granddaughter of Miss Flora and great-niece of Aunt Rosemary. Miss Flora believes that their home, Twin Elms, is haunted. Just after Nancy agreed to help solve the mystery of Twin Elms, a man named Nathan Gomber tells Nancy that her father, Carson Drew, is in great danger. Gomber represents a client and other landowners who are dissatisfied with the proceeds of land purchases for a new railroad. Mr. Drew tells Nancy to go to Twin Elms with Helen and help Miss Flora and Mrs. Hayes, as he will be traveling to Chicago during the first part of Nancy's stay at the old estate, and will join her later.

After an enjoyable dance with her former prom date, Nancy and her father inspect the railroad construction near the river but are forced to swim to safety when a runaway truck nearly runs them down. Nancy and Helen pack their bags and head off to Twin Elms, with Helen announcing the news of her engagement to her boyfriend Jim Archer over the weekend, en route. At Twin Elms, Miss Flora explains her theory of a ghost and explains the disappearance of items both precious and of little value, and strange things happening, such as music playing with no explanation. A chandelier moving by itself, and a mask held up in the windows over the next few days lead Nancy to investigate the interior and exterior of the Colonial house thoroughly. Nathan Gomber, coincidentally, is trying to buy the historic home despite protests from the Turnbull family. Although an adjoining estate with a twin home is available for purchase, it is run down and not of interest to Gomber.

In the meantime, Nancy's father fails to return from Chicago, and after tracing him to the train station, she is led to believe from eyewitness accounts that he has possibly been drugged and kidnapped. Nancy continues to search for clues to her father's whereabouts and also to solve the mystery of the intruder at Twin Elms, helped by a night watchman and discovery of a secret room. She and Helen decide to investigate the neighboring estate for clues to a secret entrance since the house was built with the same design as Twin Elms.

Upon their arrival at the realtor, Nancy is horrified to discover Nathan Gomber has just purchased the neighboring estate. Mr. Dodd agrees to lend the girls a key since Gomber has not taken possession, and they make a daytime visit to Riverview Manor. Nancy finds a secret panel to an underground passage and staircase. The tunnel leads to another staircase. But at the top of the stairs is a man who stops Nancy and Helen. Nancy discovers a missing property owner, hidden staircases and passages inside Twin Elms; with police help, she finds her father imprisoned in a room off the tunnel. Nathan Gomber is found out and arrested.

== Reception ==
By 2000, 1.8 million copies of The Hidden Staircase had been sold in the US market.

== Adaptations ==
The novel was adapted as a Warner Bros. film, Nancy Drew and the Hidden Staircase, in 1939. Another adaptation of the book from Warner Bros. was released on March 15, 2019.

The 12th installment in the Nancy Drew point-and-click adventure game series by Her Interactive, named Nancy Drew: Secret of the Old Clock, is loosely based on the novel and also incorporate elements from The Secret of the Old Clock, The Bungalow Mystery, and The Mystery at Lilac Inn.

A reference to the book is made in the pilot episode of the Nancy Drew television series, with Nancy finding a missing girl behind a hidden staircase. Later in the first season, in an episode named "The Hidden Staircase", Nancy returns to the old warehouse where she found the staircase.
