= Nancy Drew =

Fictional character in a juvenile mystery series

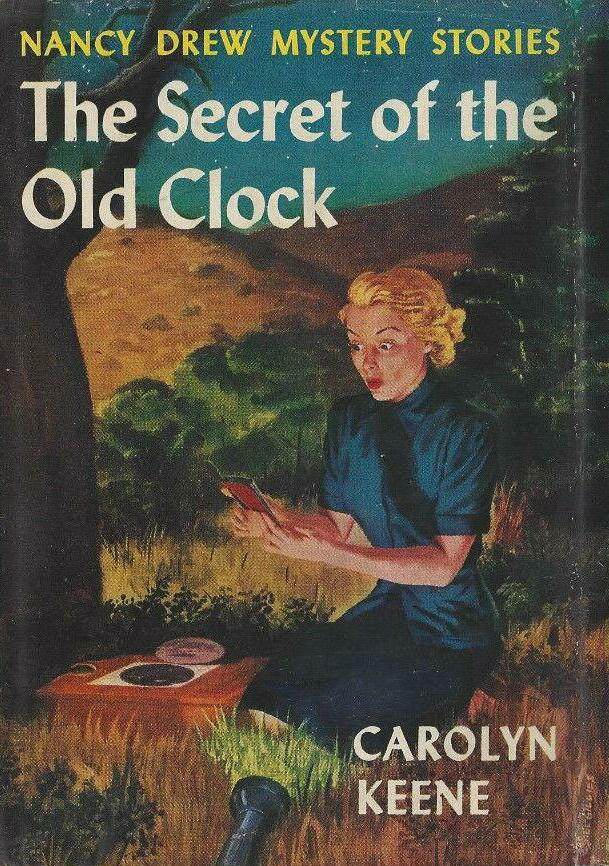
- Cover of the 1953 version of The Secret of the Old Clock, the first Nancy Drew mystery
- First appearance: The Secret of the Old Clock (1930)
- Created by: Edward Stratemeyer
- Portrayed by: Bonita Granville (1938–1939 films); Pamela Sue Martin (1977 TV series); Janet Louise Johnson (1977 TV series); Tracy Ryan (1995 TV series); Maggie Lawson (2002 TV film); Emma Roberts (2007 film); Sophia Lillis (2019 film); Kennedy McMann (2019 TV series)
- Voiced by: Lani Minella; Claire Boynton; Brittany Cox

In-universe information
- Occupation: Detective
- Family: Carson Drew (father)
- Nationality: American

Nancy Drew is a fictional character appearing in several mystery book series, movies, video games, and TV shows as a teenage amateur sleuth. The books are ghostwritten by a number of authors and published under the collective pseudonym Carolyn Keene. Created by Edward Stratemeyer, the founder of the book-packaging firm Stratemeyer Syndicate, as the female counterpart to his Hardy Boys series, the character first appeared in 1930 in the Nancy Drew Mystery Stories series, which lasted until 2003 and consisted of 175 novels. Over the decades, the character has evolved in response to changes in American culture and tastes. Beginning in 1959, the books were extensively revised and shortened, partly to lower the printing costs, with arguable success. In the revision process, the heroine's original character was changed to be less unruly and violent. In the 1980s, an older and more professional Nancy emerged in a new series, The Nancy Drew Files, that included romantic subplots for the sleuth. Launched in 2004, the Nancy Drew: Girl Detective series features Nancy driving a hybrid electric vehicle and using a cell phone. In 2012, the Girl Detective series ended, and a new series, Nancy Drew Diaries, was launched in 2013. Illustrations of the character evolved over time to reflect contemporary styles.

The Nancy Drew franchise has been adapted into other forms of media with varied success. As of April 2020, the character has been adapted into six feature films, three television series, four television pilots, 34 video games produced by the brand HeR Interactive, and two comic-book series. Film and television adaptations of the character have been met with mixed reviews, and the video games by HeR Interactive have often been lauded. The character proves continuously popular worldwide; at least 80 million copies of the books have been sold, and the books have been translated into over 45 languages.

A cultural icon, Nancy Drew is cited as a formative influence by several women, from Supreme Court Justices Sandra Day O'Connor and Sonia Sotomayor to former Secretary of State Hillary Rodham Clinton and former First Lady Laura Bush. Feminist literary critics have analyzed the character's enduring appeal, arguing variously that Nancy Drew is a mythic heroine, an expression of wish fulfillment, or an embodiment of contradictory ideas about femininity.

== Characteristics ==
Nancy Drew is a fictional amateur detective. She is originally depicted as a blonde-haired and blue-eyed 16-year-old high school graduate, but in later editions is rewritten as a titian-haired and blue-eyed 18-year-old graduate and detective. In the series, she lives in the fictional town of River Heights with her father, attorney Carson Drew, and their housekeeper, Hannah Gruen. Carson is very successful in his job, and is often called away on business for days or even weeks at a time, leaving Nancy on her own—and when this happens, he is always shown to have complete faith and trust in Nancy's ability to look after herself, and to solve mysteries. Nancy for her part is very proud of her father and his work, and is unshakable in her respect and admiration for him. She loses her mother at the age of ten in the original versions and at the age of three in the later version. This loss is reflected in her early independence—running a household since the age of ten with Hannah clearly identified as a servant in the earlier series, who is however later referred to as a surrogate parent. As a teenager, she spends her time solving mysteries; some she stumbles upon, and some begin as cases of her father's.

In the opening volumes, Nancy's closest friend is the somewhat flighty but fun-loving Helen Corning, but this character is quickly supplanted by the fifth book by her two long-term closest friends, cousins Elizabeth "Bess" Marvin and George Fayne. Bess is delicate and feminine, while George is a tomboy. The two are very much opposites, although both are both loyal to Nancy, and usually end up assisting her in the solving of whatever mystery is at hand—Bess much more so than Helen, who only appears occasionally in later volumes. Nancy is also often joined by her boyfriend Ned Nickerson, a student at Emerson College, who is introduced in the seventh book.

Nancy is often described as a super girl. In the words of Bobbie Ann Mason, she is "as immaculate and self-possessed as a Miss America on tour. She is as cool as a Rock Star and as sweet as Betty Crocker." Nancy is well-off, attractive, and amazingly talented:

At sixteen, she 'had studied psychology after and in school, and was familiar with the power of suggestion and association.' Nancy was a fine painter, spoke French, and had frequently run motorboats. She was a skilled driver who, at sixteen, 'flashed into the garage with a skill born of long practice.' The prodigy was a sure shot, an excellent swimmer, a skillful oarsman, an expert seamstress, a gourmet cook, and a fine bridge player. Nancy brilliantly played tennis and golf and rode like a cowboy. Nancy danced like Ginger Rogers and could administer first aid like the Mayo brothers.

Nancy never lacks money, and in later volumes of the series often travels to faraway locations, such as France in The Mystery of the 99 Steps (1966), Lima in The Clue in the Crossword Cipher (1967), Nairobi in The Spider Sapphire Mystery (1968), Istanbul in "The Mysterious Mannequin" (1970), Austria in Captive Witness (1981), Japan in The Runaway Bride (1994), Costa Rica in Scarlet Macaw Scandal (2004), and Alaska in Curse of The Arctic Star (2013). Nancy is also able to travel freely about the United States, thanks in part to her car, which is a blue roadster in the original series and a blue convertible in the later books. Despite the trouble and presumed expense to which she goes to solve mysteries, Nancy never accepts monetary compensation; however, by implication, her expenses are often paid by a client of her father's as part of the costs of solving one of his cases.

The character of Nancy Drew has gone through many permutations over the years. The Nancy Drew mystery series was revised beginning in 1959, with commentators agreeing that Nancy's character changed significantly from the original Nancy of the books written in the 1930s and 1940s. Observers also often see a difference between the Nancy Drew of the original series, the Nancy of The Nancy Drew Files, and the Nancy of Girl Detective series. Nevertheless, some find no significant difference among the permutations of Nancy Drew, finding Nancy to be simply a good role model for girls.

Despite revisions, "What hasn't changed, however, are [Nancy's] basic values, her goals, her humility, and her magical gift for having at least nine lives. For more than six decades, her essence has remained intact." Nancy is a "teen detective queen" who "offers girl readers something more than action-packed adventure: she gives them something original. Convention has it that girls are passive, respectful, and emotional, but with the energy of a girl shot out of a cannon, Nancy bends conventions and acts out every girl's fantasies of power."

Other commentators see Nancy as "a paradox—which may be why feminists can laud her as a formative 'girl power' icon and conservatives can love her well-scrubbed middle-class values."

== Creation ==
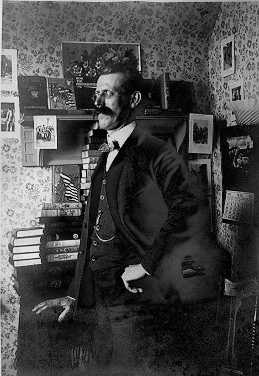
Edward Stratemeyer conceived the character and wrote plot outlines but hired Mildred Wirt Benson to ghostwrite the first volumes in the series under the pseudonym Carolyn Keene.

The character was conceived by Edward Stratemeyer, founder of the Stratemeyer Syndicate. In 1926, Stratemeyer created the Hardy Boys series (although the first volumes were not published until 1927), which was such a success that he decided on a similar series for girls, featuring an amateur girl detective as the heroine. While Stratemeyer believed that a woman's place was in the home, he was aware that the Hardy Boys books were popular with girl readers and wished to capitalize on girls' interest in mysteries by offering a strong female heroine.

Stratemeyer initially pitched the new series to Hardy Boys publishers Grosset & Dunlap as the "Stella Strong Stories," adding that "they might also be called 'Diana Drew Stories,' 'Diana Dare Stories,' 'Nan Nelson Stories,' 'Nan Drew Stories,' or 'Helen Hale Stories.'" Editors at Grosset & Dunlap preferred "Nan Drew" of these options, but decided to lengthen "Nan" to "Nancy". Stratemeyer accordingly began writing plot outlines and hired Mildred Wirt, later Mildred Wirt Benson, to ghostwrite the first volumes in the series under the pseudonym Carolyn Keene. Subsequent titles have been written by several ghostwriters under the same pseudonym.

The first four titles were published in 1930 and were an immediate success. Exact sales figures are not available for the years before 1979. Still, an indication of the books' popularity can be seen in a letter that Laura Harris, a Grosset and Dunlap editor, wrote to the Syndicate in 1931: "Can you let us have the manuscript as soon as possible, and no later than July 10? There will only be three or four titles brought out then, and Nancy Drew is one of the most important."

The 6,000 copies that Macy's ordered for the 1933 Christmas season sold out within days. In 1934, Fortune featured the Syndicate in a cover story and singled Nancy Drew out for particular attention: "Nancy is the greatest phenomenon among all the fifty-centers. She is a best seller. How she crashed a Valhalla that had been rigidly restricted to the male of her species is a mystery even to her publishers."

== History ==
=== 1930–1959: Early stories ===
The earliest Nancy Drew books were published as dark-blue hardcovers with the titles stamped in orange lettering with dark-blue outlines and no other images on the cover. The covers went through several changes in the early years: leaving the orange lettering with no outline and adding an orange silhouette of Nancy peering through a magnifying glass; then changing to a lighter blue board with dark blue lettering and silhouette; then changing the position of the title and silhouette on the front with black lettering and a more "modern" silhouette.

Nancy Drew is depicted as an independent-minded 16-year-old who has already completed her high school education (16 was the minimum age for graduation at the time). While the first four books of the series are noted for their strong continuity and sense of passing seasons and time, it is lost throughout the series with changes like Nancy's hair color being changed to titian. Her age is changed from 16 to 18 in book 31, The Ringmaster's Secret (1953), with no in-universe explanation. Affluent (her father is a successful lawyer), she maintains an active social, volunteer, and sleuthing schedule, as well as participating in athletics and the arts, but is never shown as working for a living or acquiring job skills. Nancy is affected neither by the Great Depression—although many of the characters in her early cases need assistance as they are poverty-stricken—nor World War II.

Nancy lives with her lawyer father, Carson Drew, and their housekeeper, Hannah Gruen. Some critics prefer the Nancy of these volumes, largely written by Mildred Benson. Benson is credited with "[breathing] ... a feisty spirit into Nancy's character." The original Nancy Drew is sometimes claimed: "to be a lot like [Benson] herself – confident, competent, and totally independent, quite unlike the cardboard character that [Edward] Stratemeyer had outlined."

This original Nancy is frequently outspoken and authoritative, so much so that Edward Stratemeyer told Benson that the character was "much too flip, and would never be well received." The editors at Grosset & Dunlap disagreed, but Benson also faced criticism from her next Stratemeyer Syndicate editor, Harriet Adams, who felt that Benson should make Nancy's character more "sympathetic, kind-hearted and lovable." In Benson's words, Adams repeatedly asked Benson to "make the sleuth less bold ... 'Nancy said' became 'Nancy said sweetly,' 'she said kindly,' and the like, all designed to produce a less abrasive, more caring character." Many readers and commentators, however, admire Nancy's original outspoken character.

A prominent critic of the Nancy Drew character, at least the Nancy of these early Nancy Drew stories, is mystery writer Bobbie Ann Mason. Mason contends that Nancy owes her popularity largely to "the appeal of her high-class advantages." Mason also criticizes the series for its racism and classism, arguing that Nancy is the upper-class WASP defender of a "fading aristocracy, threatened by the restless lower classes." Mason further contends that the "most appealing elements of these daredevil girl sleuth adventure books are (secretly) of this kind: tea and fancy cakes, romantic settings, food eaten in quaint places (never a Ho-Jo's), delicious pauses that refresh, old-fashioned picnics in the woods, precious jewels, and heirlooms ... The word dainty is a subversive affirmation of a feminized universe." At the bottom, says Mason, the character of Nancy Drew is that of a girl who can be "perfect" because she is "free, white, and sixteen" and whose "stories seem to satisfy two standards – adventure and domesticity. But adventure is the superstructure, domesticity the bedrock."

Others argue that "Nancy, despite her traditionally feminine attributes, such as good looks, a variety of clothes for all social occasions, and an awareness of good housekeeping, is often praised for her seemingly masculine traits ... she operates best independently, has the freedom and money to do as she pleases, and outside of a telephone call or two home, seems to live for solving mysteries rather than participating in family life."

=== 1959–1985: Continuation of Mystery Stories, revisions at Grosset & Dunlap ===
At the insistence of publishers Grosset & Dunlap, the Nancy Drew books were revised starting in 1959 to make them more modern and eliminate racist stereotypes. Although Harriet Adams felt that these changes were unnecessary, she oversaw a complete overhaul of the series, as well as writing new volumes in keeping with the new guidelines laid down by Grosset & Dunlap.

The series did not so much eliminate racial stereotypes, however, as eliminate non-white characters. For example, in the original version of The Hidden Window Mystery (1956), Nancy visits friends in the South whose African-American servant, "lovable old Beulah ... serves squabs, sweet potatoes, corn pudding, piping hot biscuits, and strawberry shortcake." The house mistress waits until Beulah has left the room and then says to Nancy, "I try to make things easier for Beulah, but she insists on cooking and serving everything the old-fashioned way. I must confess, though, that I love it." In the revised 1975 version, Beulah is changed to Anna, a "plump, smiling housekeeper".

Many other changes were relatively minor. The new books were bound in yellow with color illustrations on the front covers. Nancy's age was raised from 16 to 18, her mother was said to have died when Nancy was three, rather than ten, and other small changes were made. Housekeeper Hannah Gruen, sent off to the kitchen in early stories, became less a servant and more a mother surrogate.

Critics saw this Nancy of the 1950s, 1960s, and 1970s as an improvement in some ways, a step back in others: "In these new editions, an array of elements had been modified ... and most of the more overt elements of racism had been excised. In an often overlooked alteration, however, the tomboyish nature of the text's title character was also tamed." Nancy becomes much more respectful of male authority figures in the 1950s, 1960s, and 1970s, leading some to claim that the revised Nancy becomes too agreeable and less distinctive: "In the revised books, Nancy is relentlessly upbeat, puts up with her father's increasingly protective tendencies, and, when asked if she goes to church in the 1969 The Clue of the Tapping Heels, replies, 'As often as I can."

Harriet Adams continued to oversee the series until she died in 1982. After her death, Adams' protégés, Nancy Axelrad and Lilo Wuenn, and her three children oversaw the Nancy Drew books and other Stratemeyer Syndicate series production. In 1985, the five sold the Syndicate and all rights to Simon & Schuster. Simon & Schuster turned to book packager Mega-Books for new writers. These books continued to have the characters solve mysteries in the present day while still containing the same basic formula and style of the books during the Syndicate.

=== 1986–1997: Files, Super Mystery, and On Campus ===
The Nancy Drew Files showcased a more mature character version and romance elements, as seen on the cover of Hit and Run Holiday (1986). Here, Nancy is in swimwear, in proximity to an attractive young man rather than a clue.

In 1985, as the sale of the Stratemeyer Syndicate to Simon & Schuster was finalized, Simon & Schuster wanted to launch a spin-off series that focused on more mature mysteries and incorporated romance into the stories. To test whether this would work, the final two novels before the sale, The Bluebeard Room and The Phantom of Venice, were used as backdoor pilots for the new series.

The books read are drastically different from the preceding novels of the past 55 years. For example, The Phantom of Venice (1985) opens with Nancy wondering in italics, "Am I or am I not in love with Ned Nickerson?" Nancy begins dating other young men and acknowledges sexual desires: "'I saw [you kissing him] ... You don't have to apologize to me if some guy turns you on.' 'Gianni doesn't turn me on! ... Won't you please let me explain.'"

The next year, Simon & Schuster launched the first Nancy Drew spin-off, titled The Nancy Drew Files. However, after the above-mentioned two Mystery Stories books, as implied in The Double Horror of Fenley Place, Nancy appears to be dating Ned again and the series continues without any reference to Nancy dating other guys in The Bluebeard Room or in The Phantom of Venice.

The Nancy Drew character in the Files series has earned mixed reviews among fans. Some, including sex-positive feminists, contend that Nancy's character becomes "more like Mildred Wirt Benson's original heroine than any [version] since 1956." Others criticize the series for its increasing incorporation of romance and "[dilution] of pre-feminist moxie."

One reviewer noticed, "Millie [Mildred Wirt Benson] purists tend to look askance upon the Files series, in which fleeting pecks bestowed on Nancy by her longtime steady, Ned Nickerson, give way to lingering embraces in a Jacuzzi." Cover art for Files titles, such as Hit and Run Holiday (1986), reflects these changes; Nancy is often dressed provocatively, in short skirts, shirts that reveal her stomach or cleavage, or a bathing suit. She is often pictured with an attentive, handsome boy in the background and frequently appears aware of and interested in that boy.

The books emphasize character relationships, with Nancy Drew and Ned Nickerson becoming more of an on-off couple and having other love interests that span multiple books. However, at the end of the last book in the series, statements imply that Nancy keeps dating Ned. The end of the book Murder on Ice strongly implies that Nancy and Ned engage in sexual intercourse (at the very least, they go into a Jacuzzi together). Nancy also becomes more vulnerable, being often chloroformed into unconsciousness, or defenseless against chokeholds.

Furthermore, the minor thefts of the original books are replaced by murders and murder attempts, and Nancy is frequently in mortal danger. In an extreme example, in the book Deadly Doubles, the fate of an entire nation and millions of lives are at stake, a character is tortured and strangled off-screen, and Nancy and her allies are nearly killed on five separate occasions.

The Files also launched its spin-off. A crossover spin-off series with The Hardy Boys, titled the Super Mystery series, began in 1988. These books were in continuity with the similar Hardy Boys spin-off, The Hardy Boys Casefiles.

In 1995, Nancy Drew finally goes to college in the Nancy Drew on Campus series. These books read more similar to soap opera books, such as the Sweet Valley High series. The On Campus books focus more on romance plots and also center around other characters; the mysteries are merely used as subplots.

By reader request, Nancy broke off her long-term relationship with boyfriend Ned Nickerson in the second volume of the series, On Her Own (1995). Similar to the Files series, reception for the On Campus series was also mixed, with some critics viewing the inclusion of adult themes such as date rape as "unsuccessful". Carolyn Carpan commented that the series was "more soap opera romance than mystery" and that Nancy "comes across as dumb, missing easy clues she wouldn't have missed in previous series". The series was also criticized for focusing more on romance than on grades or studying, with one critic stating that the series resembled collegiate academic studying in the 1950s, where "women were more interested in pursuing ... the 'MRS' degree."

In 1997, Simon & Schuster announced a mass cancellation of Nancy Drew and Hardy Boys spin-offs, except for younger children. The Files series ran until the end of 1997, while both the Super Mystery and On Campus series ran until the beginning of 1998.

=== 2003–2012: Girl Detective and graphic novels ===
In 2003, publishers Simon & Schuster ended the original Nancy Drew series and began featuring Nancy's character in a new mystery series, Girl Detective. The Nancy Drew of the Girl Detective series drives a hybrid car, uses a mobile phone, and recounts her mysteries in the first person. Since the series is set in the 21st century, several technologies and pop-culture references exist. Many applaud these changes, arguing that Nancy has not changed at all other than learning to use a cell phone. Others praise the series as more realistic; Nancy, these commentators argue, is now a less perfect and therefore more likable being, one whom girls can more easily relate to – a better role model than the old Nancy because she can be emulated, rather than a "prissy automaton of perfection." (This is more a description of the Nancy of the 1959 revision, rather than the ‘unruly’ original).

Some, mostly fans, vociferously lament the changes, seeing Nancy as a silly, air-headed girl whose trivial adventures (such as discovering who squished the zucchini in 2004's Without a Trace) "hold a shallow mirror to a pre-teen's world." Leona Fisher is typical of these, trying to argue that the new series portrays an increasingly white River Heights, partially because "the clumsy first-person narrative voice makes it nearly impossible to interlace external authorial attitudes into the discourse," while it continues and worsens "the implicitly xenophobic cultural representations of racial, ethnic, and linguistic others" by introducing what she calls gratuitous speculations on characters' national and ethnic origins. There is more of this sort of thing.

The character is also the heroine of a series of graphic novels, begun in 2005 and produced by Papercutz. The graphic novels are written by Stefan Petrucha and illustrated in manga-style artwork by Sho Murase. The character's graphic novel incarnation has been described as "a fun, sassy, modern-day teen who is still hot on the heels of criminals."

When the 2007 film was released, a non-canon novelization of the movie was written to look like the older books. A new book was written for each of the Girl Detective and Clue Crew series, which deal with a mystery on a movie set. In 2008, the Girl Detective series was re-branded into trilogies with a model on the cover. These mysteries became deeper, with the mystery often spread across three books and multiple culprits. These trilogies also met with negative fan reception due to Nancy's constant mistakes, the shortness of the books, and the lack of action. With the new trilogy format, sales began slipping. In 2010, Simon & Schuster cut back from six to four Nancy Drew books per year. In December 2011, they announced that the series was canceled along with the Hardy Boys Undercover Brothers.

=== 2013–present: Diaries ===
With the cancellation of the Girl Detective series, the Nancy Drew Diaries started in 2013. The series is described as "a classic Nancy Drew with her modern twist", following Nancy, with her friends Bess and George, solving both violent and nonviolent crimes. The series is similar to the Nancy Drew Girl Detective series, continuing the first person narration, references to modern pop culture and technology, and featuring stories with themes of environmentalism. However, this series is more targeted to readers aged 8–12 with noticeable changes. This iteration of Nancy does not navigate the world of adults like previous versions of the character. She is more looked down upon by adults and has to prove herself capable of handling a mystery. This series always includes her friends. The mysteries tend to be not as thrilling since the series is made for children 8–11 years old, but certain books are indeed similar to the original Nancy Drew series.

As of 2025, there are 26 books in the series plus one holiday special published in 2018 that also features The Hardy Boys. This is the first series to be available in three different formats: paperback, hardcover (with dust jacket), and eBooks.

== Ghostwriters ==
Consistent with other Stratemeyer Syndicate properties, the Nancy Drew novels were written by various writers, all under the pen name Carolyn Keene. Following the customs of Stratemeyer Syndicate series production, ghostwriters for the Syndicate signed contracts that have sometimes been interpreted as requiring authors to sign away all rights to authorship or future royalties. Contracts stated that authors could not use their Stratemeyer Syndicate pseudonyms independently of the Syndicate. In the early days of the Syndicate, ghostwriters were paid a fee of $125, "roughly equivalent to two months' wages for a typical newspaper reporter, the primary day job of the syndicate ghosts."

During the Great Depression, this fee was lowered to $100 and eventually $75. All royalties went to the Syndicate, and all correspondence with the publisher was handled through a Syndicate office. The Syndicate was able to enlist the cooperation of libraries in hiding the ghostwriters' names; when Walter Karig, who wrote volumes eight through ten of the original Nancy Drew Mystery Stories, tried to claim rights with the Library of Congress in 1933, the Syndicate instructed the Library of Congress not to reveal the names of any Nancy Drew authors, a move with which the Library of Congress complied.

The Syndicate's process for creating the Nancy Drew books consisted of creating a detailed plot outline, drafting a manuscript, and editing the manuscript. Edward Stratemeyer and his daughters Harriet Adams and Edna Stratemeyer Squier wrote most of the outlines for the original Nancy Drew series until 1979. Volume 30, The Clue of the Velvet Mask (1953), was outlined by Andrew Svenson. Usually, other writers wrote the manuscripts. Most of the early volumes were written by Mildred Wirt Benson. Other volumes were written by Walter Karig, George Waller, Jr., Margaret Scherf, Wilhelmina Rankin, Alma Sasse, Charles S. Strong, Iris Vinton, and Patricia Doll.

Later titles were penned by Nancy Axelrad, Sharon Wagner, and James Duncan Lawrence, and according to Book Riot, Carol Gorman, Ellen Steiber, and Alison Hart Edward "each wrote several Nancy Drews in the 1980s and '90s." Stratemeyer edited the first three volumes, and Harriet Adams edited most subsequent volumes until she died in 1982. Starting in 1959, the earlier titles were revised, largely by Adams. From the late 1950s until she died in 1982, Adams herself wrote the manuscripts for most of the books.

After Adams' death, series production was overseen by Nancy Axelrad (who also wrote several volumes). The rights to the character were sold in 1984, along with the Stratemeyer Syndicate itself, to Simon & Schuster. Book packager Mega-Books subsequently hired authors to write the main Nancy Drew series and a new series, The Nancy Drew Files.

=== Legal disputes ===
In 1980, Harriet Adams switched publishers to Simon & Schuster, dissatisfied with the lack of creative control at Grosset & Dunlap and the lack of publicity for the Hardy Boys' 50th anniversary in 1977. Grosset & Dunlap filed suit against the Syndicate and the new publishers, Simon & Schuster, citing "breach of contract, copyright infringement, and unfair competition."

Adams filed a countersuit, claiming the case was in poor taste and frivolous and that, as the author of the Nancy Drew series, she retained the rights to her work. Although Adams had written many of the titles after 1953 and edited others, she claimed to be the author of all of the early titles. She had rewritten the older titles and was not their original author. When Mildred Benson was called to testify about her work for the Syndicate, Benson's role in writing the manuscripts of early titles was revealed in court with extensive documentation, contradicting Adams' claims to authorship. The court ruled that Grosset & Dunlap had the right to publish the original series as they were in print in 1980 but did not own characters or trademarks. Furthermore, any new publishers chosen by Adams were completely within their rights to print new titles.

== Illustrations ==
Nancy Drew has been illustrated by many artists over the years, and her look has been constantly updated. The Stratemeyer Syndicate and the books' publishers have exercised control over how Nancy is depicted. Some aspects of Nancy's portrayal have remained relatively constant through the decades. Her most characteristic physical depiction is that she is shown holding a flashlight.

=== 1930–1949: Russell H. Tandy ===
Commercial artist Russell H. Tandy was the first artist to illustrate Nancy Drew. Tandy was a fashion artist and infused Nancy with a contemporary fashion sensibility: her early style is that of a flatfoot flapper: heeled Mary Janes accompany her blue flapper skirt suit and cloche hat on three of the first four-volume dust jackets. As styles changed over the next few years, Nancy began to appear in glamorous frocks, with immaculately set hair, pearls, matching hats, gloves, and handbags. By the 1940s, Nancy wore simpler, tailored suits and outfits; her hair was often arranged in a pompadour. In the post-war era, Tandy's Nancy is shown hatless, wearing casual skirt and blouse ensembles, and carrying a purse, like most teens of the late 1940s.

Tandy drew the inside sketches for the first 26 volumes of the series and painted the covers of the first 26 volumes except for volume 11 – the cover artist for volume 11 is unknown. Tandy read each text before sketching, so his early covers were closely connected to specific plot scenes. He also hand-painted the cover lettering and designed the original Nancy Drew logo: a silhouette of Nancy bending slightly and looking at the ground through a magnifying glass.

Tandy often portrays Nancy Drew with confident, assertive body language. She never appears "shocked, trepidatious, or scared." Nancy is shown either boldly in the center of the action or actively, but secretively, investigating a clue. She is often observed by a menacing figure and appears to be in imminent danger, but her confident expression suggests to viewers that she is in control of the situation.

Tandy's home was struck by fire in 1962, and most of his original paintings and sketches were destroyed. As a result, the Tandy dust-jackets are considered valuable by collectors.

=== 1950–1952: Bill Gillies ===
Beginning with Tandy in 1948 and continuing into the early 1950s, Nancy's appearance was updated to follow the prevailing styles. In postwar opulence, a trend emerged for young adults to have their casual style instead of dressing in the same styles as more mature adults, and Nancy became less constrained. Sweater or blouse and skirt ensembles and a pageboy hairstyle were introduced in 1948 and continued with new artist Bill Gillies. They updated ten covers and illustrated three new jackets from 1950 to 1952. Using Gillies's wife for a model, Nancy reflects the conservative 1950s, with immaculately waved hair and a limited wardrobe – she wears a similar sweater, blouse, and skirt ensembles, in different combinations, on most of these covers. Gillies also designed the modern-era trademark as a spine symbol used for decades: Nancy's head in profile, looking through a quizzing glass.

In the later Tandy period (1946 – 1949) and throughout the 1950s, Nancy is depicted less frequently in the center of the action. The Ghost of Blackwood Hall shows an assertive Nancy leading more timid friends up the front steps of the haunted house and marks a transition to later illustrations. From 1949 forward, she is likely to observe others, often hiding or concealing herself. Her mouth is often open in surprise, and she hides her body from view. Although Nancy "expresses surprise, she is not afraid. She appears to be a bit taken aback by what she sees, but she looks as if she is still in control of the situation."

Many of these covers feature Nancy poised to observe a clue, spy on criminal activity, or display her discoveries to others involved in the mystery. Only occasionally is she shown in action, such as running from the scene of a fire, riding a horse, or actively sleuthing with a flashlight. At times she is only involved in the action as her hiding place has been discovered by others. In most cases, more active scenes are used for the frontispiece, or in books after 1954, illustrations throughout the text drawn by uncredited illustrators.

=== 1953–1979: Rudy Nappi ===
Joseph Rudolf "Rudy" Nappi, the artist from 1953 to 1979, illustrated a more average teenager. Nappi was asked by Grosset & Dunlap's art director to update Nancy's appearance, especially her wardrobe. Nappi gave Nancy Peter Pan collars shirtwaist dresses, a pageboy (later a flip) haircut, and the occasional pair of jeans. Nancy's hair color was changed from blonde to strawberry-blonde, reddish-blonde, or titian by the end of the decade. The change was long rumored to have resulted from a printing ink error. Still, it was considered so favorable that it was adopted in the text for books published after 1959 and by illustrator Polly Bolian for volumes she created for a special book club in 1959–60.

In 1962, all Grosset & Dunlap books became "picture covers", books with artwork and advertising printed directly on their covers, as opposed to books with a dust jacket over a tweed volume. The change was to reduce production costs. Several of the 1930s and 1940s cover illustrations were updated by Nappi for this change, depicting a Nancy of the Kennedy era, though the stories themselves were not updated.

Internal illustrations, dropped in 1937, were returned to the books beginning in 1954 as pen and ink line drawings, mostly by uncredited artists but usually corresponding with Nappi's style of drawing Nancy on the covers. Nappi followed trends initiated by Gillies and often illustrated Nancy wearing the same clothing more than once, including a mustard shirtwaist dress.

Unlike Tandy, Nappi did not read the books before illustrating them; his wife read them and provided him with a brief plot summary before Nappi began painting. Nappi's first cover was for The Clue of the Velvet Mask, where he began a trend of portraying Nancy as "bobby-soxer ... a contemporary sixteen-year-old. This Nancy was perky, clean-cut, and extremely animated. In the majority of his covers, Nancy looks startled – which, no doubt, she was." Nancy's style is considered conservative and remains so during the psychedelic period.

Although she wears bold colors and prints, or the background colors are shades of electric yellow, shocking pink, turquoise, or apple green, her clothing is high-necked and with long hemlines. Earlier Nappi covers show Nancy in poses similar to those in the covers by Tandy and Gillies; for many updated covers, he simply updated the characters' color scheme, clothing style, and hairstyles but retains their original poses in similar settings. Later Nappi covers show only Nancy's head or part of her body, surrounded by spooky or startling elements or clues from the story. These Nappi covers would later be used for the opening credits of the television production, with photos of Pamela Sue Martin inserted on the book covers.

Often, "Nancy's face wears the blank expression of one lost in thought," making her appear passive. On the cover of The Strange Message in the Parchment (1977), for example, in contrast to earlier covers, Nancy "is not shown in the midst of danger or even watching a mystery unfold from a distance. Instead, Nancy is shown thinking about the clues"; in general, Nancy becomes less confident and more puzzled.

=== 1980–2000s: Ruth Sanderson, Paul Frame, and others ===
Nancy is shown in danger on the cover of The Case of the Vanishing Veil (1988) and other covers from the 1980s. Unlike in earlier covers from the series, she is not completely in control of the situation.

Ruth Sanderson and Paul Frame provided cover art, and interior illustrations for the first Nancy Drew paperbacks published under the Wanderer imprint. Other artists, including Aleta Jenks and others whose names are unknown, provided the cover art, but no interior illustrations, for later paperbacks. Nancy is portrayed as "a wealthy, privileged sleuth who looks pretty and alert ... The colors, and Nancy's facial features, are often so vivid that some of the covers look more like glossy photographs than paintings."

Nancy is frequently portrayed pursuing a suspect, examining a clue or observing the action. She is often also shown in peril: being chased, falling off a boat, or hanging by a rope from rafters. These covers are "characterized by frenetic energy on Nancy's part; whether she is falling, limbs flailing, an alarmed look on her face, or running, hair flying, body bent, face breathless. Nancy does not have any control over the events that are happening in these covers. She is shown to be a victim, being hunted and attacked by unseen foes." Nancy is sometimes pursued by a visibly threatening foe, as on the cover of The Case of the Vanishing Veil (1988).

The covers of The Nancy Drew Files and Girl Detective series represent further departures from Tandy's bold, confident character. The Nancy portrayed on the covers of The Nancy Drew Files is "a markedly sexy Nancy, with a handsome young man always lurking in the background. Her clothes often reveal an ample bustline, and her expression is mischievous."

In the Girl Detective series, Nancy's face is depicted on each cover in fragments. Her eyes, for example, are confined to a strip across the top of the cover, and her mouth is near the spine, in a box, separate from her eyes. The artwork for Nancy's eyes and mouth is taken from Rudy Nappi's cover art for the revised version of The Secret of the Old Clock.

In the Diaries series, Erin McGuire made all of the cover illustrations. They depict Nancy sleuthing in the book-specific locations, much like the original series. She looks younger, and the art style is more appealing to its target demographic of children. She is always alone on the cover, usually in pursuit of a suspect.

== Books ==
The longest-running series of books to feature Nancy Drew is the original Nancy Drew series, whose 175 volumes were published from 1930 to 2003. Nancy also appeared in 124 titles in The Nancy Drew Files and became the heroine of the Diaries series. Various other series feature the character, such as the Nancy Drew Notebooks and Nancy Drew on Campus. While Nancy Drew is the central character in each series, continuity is preserved only within one series, not between them all; for example, in concurrently published titles in the Nancy Drew series and the Nancy Drew on Campus series, Nancy is respectively dating her boyfriend Ned Nickerson and broken up with Ned Nickerson.

The two exceptions are the series Super Mystery (also called A Nancy Drew and Hardy Boys Super Mystery), which ran concurrently with the Files and shares continuity with those stories and the then-running Hardy Boys Casefiles, and in 2007, a new A Nancy Drew and Hardy Boys Super Mystery series shared continuity with the Girl Detective series. The Hardy Boys also appeared in the special holiday book of the Diaries series.

In 2023, the history of the Nancy Drew franchise was chronicled in What is the Story of Nancy Drew?, a children's nonfiction book written by Dana Meachen Rau and illustrated by Dede Putra, with an unabridged narration performed by Jorjeana Marie.

=== Public domain in the United States ===
On January 1, 2026, the first four books of the Nancy Drew detective series written in 1930 entered the public domain.

=== International publications ===
The main Nancy Drew series, The Nancy Drew Files, and the Girl Detective books have been translated into a number of languages besides English. Estimates vary from between 14 and 25 languages. Nancy Drew books have been published in many European countries (especially in Nordic countries and France) as well as in Latin America and Asia. The character of Nancy Drew seems to be more popular in some countries than others. Nancy Drew books have been in print in Norway since 1941 (the first country outside the United States), in Denmark since 1958, in France since 1955, and in Italy since 1970 by Arnoldo Mondadori Editore. Other countries, such as Estonia, have only recently begun printing Nancy Drew books.

Nancy's name is often changed in translated editions: in France, she is known as Alice Roy; in Sweden, as Kitty Drew; in Finland, as Paula Drew; and in Norway, the book series has the name of Frøken Detektiv (Miss Detective), though the heroine's name is still Nancy Drew inside the books. In Germany, Nancy is a German law student named Susanne Langen. George Fayne's name is even more frequently changed, to Georgia, Joyce, Kitty, or Marion. Cover art and series order is often changed as well, and in many countries, only a limited number of Drew books are available in translation.

== Films ==
=== Bonita Granville ===
In 1937, Warner Bros. bought the rights to the Nancy Drew book series from the Stratemeyer Syndicate, for a reported $6,000. Warner Bros. wanted to make a series of B-films based on the character, to serve as a companion to their popular Torchy Blane B-film series, which starred Glenda Farrell, Barton MacLane, and Tom Kennedy. Adams sold the rights to Jack L. Warner without an agent or any consultation; thus, she sold all and any film rights to Warner Bros., a move she would later regret and that would later come into question by her publishers.

From 1938 to 1939, four films in the series were released. All of them were directed by William Clemens, written by Torchy Blane writer Kenneth Gamet, and featured the same primary cast: Bonita Granville as Nancy Drew, John Litel as Carson Drew, and Frankie Thomas as Ted Nickerson (changed from Ned Nickerson). Renie Riano and Frank Orth also appeared in some of the films as Effie Schneider and Captain Tweedy, respectively.

The four are as follows:

- Nancy Drew... Detective (November 1938; loosely based on The Password to Larkspur Lane)
- Nancy Drew... Reporter (February 1939)
- Nancy Drew... Trouble Shooter (June 1939)
- Nancy Drew and the Hidden Staircase (September 1939; loosely based on The Hidden Staircase)

The series was announced by Warner Bros. in April 1938; production of the first film, Nancy Drew Gets the Passport, was set to begin production in June, directed by John Farrow with a screenplay from Robertson White. However, for unclear reasons, Farrow and White were replaced by Clemens and Gamet, and production was delayed to August. The first two films did well enough to allow Warner Bros. to expand the budgets for the third and fourth films; in early 1939, they announced the green-lighting of an additional four films, which would have brought the total up to eight.

After the second film, Warner Bros. assigned the third film, originally titled Nancy Drew Steps Out, to Eddie Anderson and Charles Perry; like White, they were replaced under unclear circumstances. Gamet was once again rehired to write for the series and completed writing the eight films. In late 1939, Warner Bros. decided to eliminate their double feature setup, thus canceling the Nancy Drew film series. Although it was initially announced that the Nancy Drew series would be converted into two-reelers, Warner Bros. canceled those plans days later. Gamet had at least written the fifth and sixth film, and the fifth may have been produced. Frankie Thomas stated that he believes he and Granville had made five films, not four, while Harriet Adams wrote in August 1939 to Mildred Wirt, the ghostwriter of the books at the time, that "three have been shown in this area, and I have just heard that a fifth is in production." In addition, Gamet had reportedly written a sixth film.

Critical reaction to these films was mixed. Some found that the movies do not "depict the true Nancy Drew", in part because Granville's Nancy "blatantly used her feminine wiles (and enticing bribes)" to accomplish her goals. The films also portray Nancy as childish and easily flustered, a significant change from her portrayal in the books. Just as with the critics, both ghostwriter Mildred Wirt and editor Harriet Adams were also divided on the films' reception. Adams did not like the films and resented the studio for its treatment of the character; she did, however, keep a personalized autographed photo from Granville on her office desk for many years according to her employees and may have used John Litel's portrayal of Carson Drew to revamp the character when she revised the books in the 1960s and 1970s. Contrary to Adams, Benson was said to have liked the films of the time, despite them being different from the character she wrote.

To promote the film, Warner Bros. created a Nancy Drew fan club that included a set of rules such as "must have steady boy friend, in the sense of a 'pal'" and must "take part in choosing own clothes." These rules were based on some research Warner Bros. had done on the habits and attitudes of "typical" teenage girls. Granville was the "honorary president" of the fan club, and a kit for the club came with autographed pictures of her.

The series became somewhat of a cult success after the films started appearing on cable channels such as Turner Classic Movies. The films were arguably ones in which all five cast members were notable for in their careers. Granville recalled making the films fondly and later called Nancy Drew... Trouble Shooter her favorite of the four. She and Litel would later reunite for the 1947 film The Guilty, produced by Granville's husband Jack Wrather.

=== Emma Roberts ===
A new film version of Nancy Drew had been in the works at Warner Bros. since the mid-1990s. However, nothing came to fruition until the mid-2000s. On June 15, 2007, Warner Bros. Pictures released a new film titled Nancy Drew, with Emma Roberts starring as Nancy, Max Thieriot as Ned Nickerson, and Tate Donovan as Carson Drew; Andrew Fleming directed and cowrote the film with Tiffany Paulsen, while Jerry Weintraub produced. This film sees Nancy move to Los Angeles with her father on an extended business trip and pick the house of a murdered movie star as their house to solve the cold case.

As with the earlier Drew films, reactions were mixed. Some see the film as an updated version of the basic character: "Although it has been glammed up for the lucrative tween demographic, the movie retains the best parts of the books, including, of course, their intelligent main character." Others find the movie "jolting" because Nancy's "new classmates prefer shopping to sleuthing, and Nancy's plaid skirt, penny loafers, and magnifying glass make her something of a dork, not the town hero she was in the Midwest." Before the release of the 2007 film, Roberts, Fleming, and Weintraub had signed on for two Nancy Drew sequels, but these films were never made.

=== Sophia Lillis ===
On April 20, 2018, Warner Bros. announced they were making a new Nancy Drew film series, starring Sophia Lillis as Nancy. The first film was adapted from The Hidden Staircase, with Ellen DeGeneres and Wendy Williams among the producers.

== Television ==
=== The Hardy Boys/Nancy Drew Mysteries ===
The first and most successful attempt at bringing Nancy Drew to life on television was The Hardy Boys/Nancy Drew Mysteries, which ran from 1977 to 1979 on ABC. Future Dynasty star Pamela Sue Martin starred as Nancy, with Jean Rasey and George O'Hanlon, Jr. as friends George and Ned, and William Schallert as Carson Drew.

The first season originally alternated with the Hardy Boys; the Hardy Boys was met with success, but the Drew episodes were met with mixed results. In the second season, the format shifted to present the Hardy Boys as the more prominent characters, with Nancy Drew mostly a character in crossover episodes.

The three "solo" episodes made that season featured Susan Buckner in the role of George, and focused on more bizarre cases. After the thirteenth episode, Martin left the series, citing the changes made to the character and show. 19-year-old Janet Louise Johnson replaced Martin for her final four appearances, all of which were crossover episodes. When the series came back for a third season, Nancy Drew was dropped from the series, with it now focusing completely on the Hardy Boys; ABC canceled the series soon after this change.

Though the Nancy Drew aspect of the show received mixed reception, it is regarded as the most faithful adaptation of the character, with Martin often regarded by many fans as the best actress to portray her. The series was also faithful in its tone of smaller mysteries, such as haunted houses or theft.

=== Nancy Drew (1995 TV series) ===
The second Nancy Drew series, Nancy Drew aired in first-run syndication from September to December 1995. Produced by Nelvana, Tracy Ryan starred as Nancy Drew, who is now a 21-year-old criminology student, moving to New York City and living in an upscale apartment complex called the "Callisto". Nancy solves various mysteries with Bess (Jhene Erwin), a gossip columnist at The Rag, and George (Joy Tanner), a mail carrier and amateur filmmaker. Scott Speedman recurs as Ned Nickerson, who works on charity missions in Africa. This Nancy Drew series was again partnered with a series based on The Hardy Boys, with Ryan appearing in two episodes of the latter series as Nancy.

The show was based on The Nancy Drew Files series, and the three stars were used on several of the series' covers to promote the show. Both shows were cancelled midway through their first seasons due to low ratings. The poorly-syndicated half-hour shows aired in a slot outside of prime time on the newly launched The WB and UPN networks. The entire series has since been released on DVD, and has appeared on several online streaming sites, including the Retro Rerun YouTube channel.

==== List of episodes ====
| # | Episode Title | Directed by | Written by | Air date |
|---|---|---|---|---|
| 1 | "Welcome to the Callisto" | Alex Chapple | Laura Phillips | September 23, 1995 |
| 2 | "Happy Birthday, Nancy" | Jon Cassar | Laura Phillips (story); Renata Bright (teleplay) | September 30, 1995 |
| 3 | "Exile" | Jon Cassar | Laura Phillips | October 7, 1995 |
| 4 | "Asylum" | Don McCutcheon | Dennise Fordham and Nadine van der Velde (story); Renata Bright (teleplay) | October 14, 1995 |
| 5 | "The Ballad of Robin Hood" | Stacey Stewart Curtis | Dennise Fordham | October 21, 1995 |
| 6 | "Bridal Arrangements" | Eleanore Lindo | Anna Rehak and Nadine van der Velde (story); Nadine van der Velde (teleplay) | October 28, 1995 |
| 7 | "The Death and Life of Billy Feral" | Bruce McDonald | Laura Phillips | November 4, 1995 |
| 8 | "Double Suspicion" | Jon Cassar | Dawn Ritchie | November 11, 1995 |
| 9 | "The Stranger by the Road" | Jon Cassar | Elizabeth Baxter | November 18, 1995 |
| 10 | "Photo Finish" | Don McCutcheon | Lawrence Shore and Johnathan Levine | November 25, 1995 |
| 11 | "Who's Hot, Who's Not" | Alex Chapple | Laura Phillips | December 2, 1995 |
| 12 | "Fashion Victim" | Don McCutcheon | Elizabeth Baxter | December 9, 1995 |
| 13 | "The Long Journey Home" | Ron Oliver | Jeffrey Frohner | December 16, 1995 |

=== Nancy Drew (2002 film) ===
On December 15, 2002, ABC aired Nancy Drew, starring Maggie Lawson and produced by Lawrence Bender. The movie was intended to be a pilot for a possible weekly series, which would see Nancy and her friends going off to college in a modern setting and Nancy pursuing a journalism degree. Like the 1930s films, this pilot also took a more mature turn, with the mystery being a drug bust and Nancy having a falling out with her father. The pilot aired as part of the Wonderful World of Disney series, with additional scripts being ordered and production contingent on the movie's ratings and reception. The series was passed at ABC, and UPN also passed after Lawson was cast in another ABC series.

=== Nancy Drew (2019 TV series) ===
The third television series, Nancy Drew, premiered on The CW on October 9, 2019. Developed by Josh Schwartz and Stephanie Savage, this series stars Kennedy McMann as Nancy Drew, with co-stars including Leah Lewis as George and Scott Wolf as Carson Drew. This series revolves around Nancy as she heads off to college, only to have to stay back for another year after finding herself the prime suspect in a murder investigation. Like other adaptations of the character, it has received mixed reviews.

Much like fellow CW series Riverdale, the adaptation features serialized, soap opera-esque storylines. In addition to including more mature elements such as sex and violence, the series relies on supernatural elements, such as ghosts and extrasensory perception. In addition, it greatly diverges from several of the source material's formula (e.g. race and personality changes of the main characters; Nancy, Bess, and George not being friends; Ned/"Nick" is a former criminal and an older, secret boyfriend), location (e.g. the main setting being the fictional seaside town of Horseshoe Bay, Maine, instead of the fictional Midwestern city of River Heights), and background (e.g., Carson Drew is not Nancy's biological father, Nancy's adoptive mother dying when she was an older teenager instead of a child).

=== Failed TV attempts ===
In March 1957, CBS greenlit a pilot for a television series based on the books for the 1957–58 television season, which was produced by Private Secretary writer Arthur Hoffe. At that time, it was reported that Robin Morgan and Natalie Trundy were under consideration for the role of Nancy. However, by late May, 17-year-old former RKO contract actress Jan Norris was cast in the role of Nancy. CBS initially did not make a decision on the project for the fall schedule, instead opting to roll it to midseason or the 1958–59 season. An initial pilot was produced in April, though the network was reportedly unsatisfied with the results and replaced Hoffe with Mama producer Carol Irwin. A new pilot from Irwin was produced and directed by Don Richardson. Under Irwin, scripts were being written, but by September, CBS had lost the rights to the books and the project was abandoned.

In the 2010s and early 2020s, the 1950s pilot was believed to have been produced by Desilu based on the Warner Bros. films, and starred Roberta Shore as Nancy, Tim Considine as Ned Nickerson, and Frankie Thomas, Jr. as Carson Drew. However, this conflicts with contemporary reports. Considine and Shore were both under contract to The Mickey Mouse Club — where Considine had portrayed Frank Hardy in a serial based on The Hardy Boys books — and Thomas had retired in 1955.

In October 1989, Canadian production company Nelvana began filming for a 13-episode Nancy Drew television series called Nancy Drew and Daughter for USA Network. Margot Kidder was cast as an adult Nancy Drew, and her daughter, Maggie McGuane, was cast as Nancy's daughter. However, Kidder was seriously injured during filming of the first episode when the brakes failed on the car she was driving. The pilot was not finished, and the series was cancelled.

In October 2015, CBS announced it would be developing a new series based on an older version of Nancy. In January 2016, CBS ordered a pilot under the working title Drew, and that the character would be a non-Caucasian New York City police detective in her thirties. The pilot, written by Joan Rater and Tony Phelan, revolved around Nancy investigating the death of Bess Marvin, and reentering the NYPD after taking leave. Sarah Shahi was cast as Nancy Drew, with Vanessa Ferlito as George Fayne, Anthony Edwards as Carson Drew, Steve Kazee as Ned Nickerson, and Debra Monk as Hannah Gruen. The pilot was shot in location in New York City during March 2016, and was directed by James Strong. During this time, Phelan and Rater had another pilot, Doubt, which many television reporters often placed in competition for a series order with Drew. On May 14, 2016, it was announced that CBS decided to order Doubt, and pass on the Drew pilot, so CBS Studios could shop it to other networks for series consideration, though none did.

In October 2017, Phelan and Rater brought a redeveloped pilot to NBC, where the plot now revolved around a middle-aged Nancy who wrote her adventures into novels has to team up with her former friends to solve a murder mystery. However, the redeveloped plot never made it to pilot at the network, and Phelan and Rater have since left CBS Studios.

== Other media ==
=== Video games ===
Computer games publisher HeR Interactive began publishing an adventure game series based on the character in 1998. The games follow the popular "point-and-click format" with players playing as Nancy and using their mouse to move around a virtual environment to talk to suspects, pick up clues, solve puzzles, and eventually solve the crime. Many of the games are either directly or loosely adapted from novels in the various series, while some others are new storylines created by the company.

The series is generally designed for PC. The earliest releases were solely compatible with Microsoft Windows while later releases are also compatible with Mac OS. Some of the games have been ported to other systems, such as the Nintendo Wii and Game Boy Advance, and one was released on Interactive DVD. The games are aimed at a family audience, with the suggestion of "ages 10 and up"; most of the games have the ESRB rating of E, though Shadow at the Water's Edge and The Captive Curse are rated E10+. Lani Minella voiced the Nancy character for thirty-two games from Her Interactive from 1998 until 2015. After the release of Sea of Darkness, the company announced that Minella would not be returning to the series. She was replaced with Brittany Cox beginning with the release of Midnight in Salem in 2019.

The games and company overall have received recognition throughout its history for being a pioneer in female gaming, and have been dubbed into several different languages internationally. Her Interactive has also released two adventure game/hidden object hybrid games Lights, Camera, Curses (2008) and Resorting to Danger (2009) under the Nancy Drew Dossier series. The iOS game Nancy Drew: Codes & Clues was released in May 2016, designed for younger audiences to develop skills in computer programming.

In addition to the games created by Her Interactive, Majesco and Gorilla Systems Co. have released Nancy Drew: Deadly Secret of Olde World Park (2007) and Nancy Drew: The Mystery of the Clue Bender Society (2008) for the Nintendo DS. THQ has also released two games for the Nintendo DS, Nancy Drew: The Hidden Staircase (2008) and Nancy Drew: The Model Mysteries (2010).

=== Comics and graphic novels ===
Papercutz and Dynamite Entertainment had both published authorized Nancy Drew comics and graphic novels.

List of Nancy Drew comics and graphic novels published by Papercutz

| Title | Author(s) | Illustrator | Year(s) of Publication | Notes |
|---|---|---|---|---|
| Nancy Drew: Girl Detective | Stefan Petrucha | Sho Murase | 2005-2010 | The twenty-one volume graphic novel series combines new plots and elements from the original mystery novels. The last two volumes feature Nancy Drew solving cases with the Dana girls, the protagonists of another mystery novel series also written under the pseudonym of Carolyn Keene. |
| Nancy Drew and the Clue Crew | Sarah Kinney, Stefan Petrucha | Stan Goldberg | 2012 | A three-issue comic adaptation of Nancy Drew and the Clue Crew. |

The Papercutz adaptations are no longer in print while Dynamite Entertainment released five Nancy Drew graphic novels, four of which are unique plots that crossover with The Hardy Boys.

List of Nancy Drew graphic novels published by Dynamite Entertainment

| Title | Author | Illustrator | Year of Publication | Notes |
|---|---|---|---|---|
| Nancy Drew and the Hardy Boys: The Big Lie | Anthony Del Col | Werther Dell'Edera | 2017 | The six-issue series is a hardboiled noir take on the title characters, and finds Nancy Drew as a femme fatale-esque character helping Frank and Joe Hardy clear their names in the murder of their father, Fenton Hardy. |
| Nancy Drew: The Palace of Wisdom | Kelly Thompson | Jenn St-Onge | 2018 | The five-issue series follows Nancy Drew as she returns to Bayport after receiving a mysterious letter. She reunites with her friends-Bess Marvin, George Fayne, and Frank and Joe Hardy-to solve the murders of women, the clues pointing to a club called The Palace of Wisdom. Helping in the investigation is Pete Vega, a young Black man who had sent Nancy the letter because his mother, Mariana, is one of the victims. When Bayport's racist police refused to investigate Mariana's death, Pete hopes Nancy will close the case and help bring closure for all the victims' loved ones. |
| Nancy Drew and the Hardy Boys: The Mystery of the Missing Adults | Scott Bryan Wilson | Bob Solanovic | 2019 | Similar to Nancy Drew and the Clue Crew, the eponymous sleuths are depicted as children as they investigate the mysterious disappearance of their parents and teachers. |
| Nancy Drew and the Hardy Boys: The Death of Nancy Drew | Anthony Del Col | Joe Eisma | 2020 | In this six-issue sequel to Nancy Drew and the Hardy Boys: The Big Lie, the girl detective has successfully proven the Hardy brothers innocent of patricide. On the other hand, Nancy herself is forced to stage her own murder when someone makes an attempt on her life. Returning the favor, Frank and Joe aid their friend in identifying who wants her dead. |
| Nancy Drew Omnibus Vol. 1 | Stefan Petrucha | Sho Murase | 2021 | A graphic novel containing the first three volumes of the comic series originally published by Papercutz. It remains unknown whether the rest of the Papercutz series will be reissued, and the omnibus is the first Dynamite Entertainment-published Nancy Drew graphic novel not to crossover with The Hardy Boys. |

=== Musicals ===
In 2018, Jeremy Desmon and Jeff Thomson were commissioned to compose Nancy Drew: The Musical, a planned theatrical reboot set in the future, depicting the eponymous sleuth as having married her boyfriend, Ned Nickerson, and having a family with him. Now a mother and a grandmother, the elderly Nancy Drew has been estranged from her daughter Diana Nickerson and granddaughter Nancy Nickerson. A chance to mend fences arises when all three generations of Drew women go on a cruise and solve a mystery together.

In 2023, it was announced that another musical adaptation titled Nancy Drew and the Mystery at Spotlight Manor is being made. The piece is set to feature original music composed by Alan Menken and Nell Benjamin, a book by Sarah Kernochan, with James Lapine directing.

As of 2025, there have been no further updates regarding the two planned Nancy Drew musicals.

== Merchandising ==
A number of Nancy Drew products have been licensed over the years, primarily in the 1950s, 1960s, and 1970s.

=== Dolls ===
In 1967 Madame Alexander produced a Nancy Drew doll. The doll carried binoculars and camera and was available in two outfits: with a plaid coat or a dress and short jacket. Harriet Adams disapproved of the doll's design, believing Nancy's face to be too childish, but the doll was marketed nonetheless. Various Nancy Drew coloring, activity, and puzzle books have also been published, as has a Nancy Drew puzzle. A Nancy Drew Halloween costume and a Nancy Drew lunchbox were produced in the 1970s as television show tie-ins.

=== Board games ===
In 1957, Parker Brothers released The Nancy Drew Mystery Game, an authorized board game in which two to four players compete to locate the titular girl detective's current whereabouts as she investigates a case.

As of 2022, Canadian games manufacturer Outset Media, in partnership with Simon & Schuster, had also released authorized Nancy Drew board games and jigsaw puzzles.

A 1,000-piece jigsaw puzzle shows a gallery of Nancy Drew book covers when completed.

Nancy Drew Collector is a card game set at a premiere auction of Nancy Drew novels. To play the game, two to four participants must answer "Yes" or "No" questions, each outbidding the others on their favourite Nancy Drew books.

Nancy Drew Mysteries Board Game requires deduction skills and is played similarly to the British-made Cluedo. With thirty-five possible solutions, the objective of the game is for three to six players to deduce the following:

- Which mystery needs solving
- Who is the Nancy Drew character in trouble
- What tool has been used in the investigation
- Which of the suspects has committed the crime
- What crime has been committed

== Cultural impact ==
According to commentators, the cultural impact of Nancy Drew has been enormous. The immediate success of the series led directly to the creation of numerous other girls' mysteries series, such as The Dana Girls mystery stories and the Kay Tracey mystery stories, and the phenomenal sales of the character Edward Stratemeyer feared was "too flip" encouraged publishers to market many other girls' mystery series, such as the Judy Bolton Series, and to request authors of series such as the Cherry Ames Nurse Stories to incorporate mystery elements into their works. The Nancy Drew Mystery Stories series and other girls' series books faced criticism for the formulaic nature of their plots and the poor quality of the actual books.

Many prominent and successful women cite Nancy Drew as an early formative influence whose character encouraged them to take on unconventional roles, including U.S. Supreme Court Justices Sandra Day O'Connor, Ruth Bader Ginsburg, and Sonia Sotomayor; TV personalities Oprah Winfrey and Barbara Walters; singers Barbra Streisand and Beverly Sills; mystery authors Sara Paretsky and Nancy Pickard; scholar Carolyn Heilbrun; actresses Ellen Barkin and Emma Roberts; former Secretary of State Hillary Rodham Clinton; former First Lady Laura Bush; and former president of the National Organization for Women Karen DeCrow. When the first Nancy Drew conference was held, at the University of Iowa, in 1993, conference organizers received a flood of calls from women who "all had stories to tell about how instrumental Nancy had been in their lives, and about how she had inspired, comforted, entertained them through their childhoods, and, for a surprising number of women, well into adulthood."

Nancy Drew's popularity continues unabated: In 2002, the first Nancy Drew book published, The Secret of the Old Clock, alone sold 150,000 copies that year, good enough for top-50 ranking in children's books, and other books in the series sold over 100,000 copies each. Sales of the hardcover volumes of the original Nancy Drew series alone has surpassed sales of Agatha Christie titles, and newer titles in the Girl Detective series have reached The New York Times bestseller lists. Entertainment Weekly ranked her seventeenth on its list of "The Top 20 Heroes" ahead of Batman, explaining that Drew is the "first female hero embraced by most little girls ... [Nancy lives] in an endless summer of never-ending adventures and unlimited potential." The magazine goes on to cite Scooby-Doo's Velma Dinkley as well as Veronica Mars as Nancy Drew's "copycat descendants".

Many feminist critics have pondered the reason for the character's iconic status. Nancy's car, and her skill in driving and repairing it, are often cited. Melanie Rehak points to Nancy's famous blue roadster (now a blue hybrid) as a symbol of "ultimate freedom and independence". Not only does Nancy have the freedom to go where she pleases (a freedom other, similar characters such as The Dana Girls do not have), but she is also able to change a tire and fix a flawed distributor, prompting Paretsky to argue that in "a nation where car mechanics still mock or brush off complaints by women Nancy remains a significant role model."

Nancy is also treated with respect: her decisions are rarely questioned and she is trusted by those around her. Male authority figures believe her statements, and neither her father nor Hannah Gruen, the motherly housekeeper, "place ... restrictions on her comings and goings." Nancy's father not only imposes no restrictions on his daughter, but trusts her with both her own car and his gun (in the original version of The Hidden Staircase [1930]), asks her advice on a frequent basis, and accedes to all her requests. Some critics, such as Betsy Caprio and Ilana Nash, argue that Nancy's relationship with her continually approving father is satisfying to girl readers because it allows them to vicariously experience a fulfilled Electra complex.

Unlike other girl detectives, Nancy does not go to school (for reasons that are never explained, but assuming because she has finished), and she thus has complete autonomy. Similar characters, such as Kay Tracey, do go to school, and not only lose a degree of independence but also of authority. The fact of a character's being a school-girl reminds "the reader, however fleetingly, of the prosaic realities of high-school existence, which rarely includes high adventures or an authoritative voice in the world of adults."

Some see in Nancy's adventures a mythic quality. Nancy often explores secret passages, prompting Nancy Pickard to argue that Nancy Drew is a figure equivalent to the ancient Sumerian deity Inanna and that Nancy's "journeys into the 'underground'" are, in psychological terms, explorations of the unconscious. Nancy is a heroic figure, undertaking her adventures not for the sake of adventure alone, but in order to help others, particularly the disadvantaged. For this reason, Nancy Drew has been called the modern embodiment of the character of "Good Deeds" in Everyman.

In the end, many critics agree that at least part of Nancy Drew's popularity depends on the way in which the books and the character combine sometimes contradictory values, with Kathleen Chamberlain writing in The Secrets of Nancy Drew, "For over 60 years, the Nancy Drew series has told readers that they can have the benefits of both dependence and independence without the drawbacks, that they can help the disadvantaged and remain successful capitalists, that they can be both elitist and democratic, that they can be both child and adult, and that they can be both 'liberated' women and Daddy's little girls." As another critic puts it, "Nancy Drew 'solved' the contradiction of competing discourses about American womanhood by entertaining them all."

== See also ==
- The Hardy Boys
- Judy Bolton
- Trixie Belden
