= Rudy Nappi =

American artist (1923–2015)

Joseph Rudolph Nappi, working as Rudy Nappi (February 12, 1923 – March 13, 2015) was an American illustrator. According to the National Museum of American Illustration, Nappi was "a well-known commercial illustrator and widely considered one of the greatest pulp fiction artists of his time." Nappi created the cover art for many mid-20th century Nancy Drew and Hardy Boys series titles. Nappi's original artwork is "avidly collected."

== Life and work ==
Nappi was born in Orangetown, New York. After serving in the Army Air Corps in World War II, Nappi used the benefits of the G.I. Bill to go to school at the Art Students League of New York, and then showed his portfolio to a pulp fiction publisher who hired him.

He was then contracted to create the cover art for Nancy Drew No. 30, The Clue of the Velvet Mask, in 1953 for Grosset & Dunlap and ended up creating cover art for over 150 Grosset & Dunlap titles over three decades, including Nancy Drew, Hardy Boys, and one Bobbsey Twins. Nappi created the original covers for Hardy Boys Nos. 32–58, and 64 Hardy Boys cover artworks in total. Similarly, in addition to creating the covers for newly issued Nancy Drew titles, he created updated images for existing titles. His personal favorite was the cover of Number 4, The Mystery at Lilac Inn. Nappi did not read the books but his wife Peggy did, and she provided a synopsis from which he created an image.

Much of his cover artwork was done using oil paint on board. Other Nappi clients were Scholastic (including their imprint Little Apple), Harlequin, Mills & Boon, Avon Books, Signet Books, Pocket Books, Pyramid and Belmont. Magazine work included pictures for Two-Fisted Detective Tales, Confessions Illustrated and Shock Illustrated. Nappi also created art for Norcross and Marion Heath greeting cards, and decorations for Keller Charles household goods.
