= Zotz =

Zotz may refer to:

- Zotz (surname)
- Zotz!, a 1962 film based on a 1947 novel by Walter Karig
- Zotz (candy), a fizzing hard candy
- El Zotz, an archaeological site in Guatemala
- The month Zotz or Sotz of the Haab' Pre-Columbian Maya calendar

== See also ==
- Camazotz, bat god in Maya mythology
- Zot!, comic book created by Scott McCloud
- Zot!, sound reported in B. C. (comic strip) when the anteater lashes his tongue at ants
