= The Greek Symbol Mystery =

Nancy Drew 60, published 1981

- First edition
- Author: Carolyn Keene
- Cover artist: Ruth Sanderson
- Language: English
- Series: Nancy Drew stories
- Genre: Detective, Mystery novel
- Publisher: Wanderer Books
- Publication date: May 19, 1981
- Publication place: United States
- Media type: Print (hardback & paperback)
- Pages: 171
- ISBN: 0-207-14586-5
- OCLC: 27501930
- Preceded by: The Secret in the Old Lace
- Followed by: The Swami's Ring

The Greek Symbol Mystery is the 60th volume in the Nancy Drew Mystery Stories series. It was originally published in paperback in 1981 by the Wanderer imprint of Simon & Schuster. The original edition had a cover and six interior illustrations by Ruth Sanderson. The cover art was later revised by Garin Baker in 1986 for the last Wanderer printing, and again by Linda Thomas in 1989 for the Minstrel printing.

== Places ==
Some real places in Greece mentioned in this book are:

- Loutraki
- Monastiraki
- Flea Market
- Skyros Hotel
- The Harbour of Piraeus
- The Theaters of Herodotus Atticus
- Acropolis
- Corfu Island
- Lycabettus Hill
- Plaka

== Characters ==
INA version:

- Nancy Drew
- Carson Drew: Nancy's father
- Hannah Gruen: Drew family housekeeper
- Bess Marvin: Nancy's best friend
- George Fayne: Nancy's best friend and Bess's first cousin
- Ned Nickerson: Nancy's boyfriend
- Burt Eddleton: George's boyfriend
- Dave Evans: Bess's boyfriend
- Helen Nicholas: Nancy's friend (not to be confused with Helen Corning)
- Mrs. Jeanette Thompson: Nancy's neighbor who sends money to the Papadapoulos family
- Dimitri Georgiou: NY Photini Agency manager
- Vatis: lawyer, owner of the law firm Vatis & Vatis
- Isakos: Vatis's friend
- Constantine Nicholas: Helen's cousin
- Diakos: villain
- Alexis: Coast Guard
- Mousiadis: Nancy's father's friend
- Fotis: ship captain
- Stella Anagnost: Constantine's girlfriend who works at the jewelry store where Nancy sees the mysterious golden mask
- Papadopoulos family: Mrs. Papadopoulos and her children: Maria, Michali, Anna
- Peter Scourles: Vatis & Vatis employee

== Adaptation ==
The 31st installment in the Nancy Drew point-and-click adventure game series by Her Interactive, named Nancy Drew: Labyrinth of Lies, is loosely based on the novel.
