= List of Nancy Drew characters =

This is a list of characters in the Nancy Drew series. They are all characters who have appeared in a Nancy Drew book, film, or television show.

== Characters by Surname ==
=== B ===
- John Boonton is the brother of Anna Marvin, and Louise Fayne.
- Peter Boonton is the great-uncle of George and Bess.

=== D ===
- Carson Drew is an attorney, and father to Nancy.
- Nancy Drew is a young woman with an interest in solving mysteries. She has been portrayed across many ages. In the series Nancy Drew and the Clue Crew she is shown as a precocious eight-year old, becoming interested in mystery solving for the first time. In the series Nancy Drew On Campus, she is attending Wilder University.

=== F ===
- Louise Booton Fayne is the mother of George. She grew up on a farm in Ohio.
- George Fayne is the best friend of Nancy Drew.
- Scott Fayne is the youngest Fayne sibling.
- Sebastien Fayne is the oldest Fayne sibling.

=== G ===
- Peter Goodwin was introduced in the novel New Lives, New Loves, as a new love interest for Nancy Drew.
- Hannah Gruen is the Drew's live in housekeeper.

=== H ===
- Raymond Hill is the executive vice president of the Smith’s Ferry branch of the River Heights National Bank.

=== J ===
- Emma Jemitt was introduced in The Sign of the Twisted Candles as the adopted mother of Carol Wipple.
- Frank Jemiit was introduced in The Sign of the Twisted Candles as the adopted father of Carol Wipple.

=== K ===
- Leslie King was introduced in the 1995 novel, New Lives, New Loves, as the roommate to Bess Marvin.

=== M ===
- Anna Boonton Marvin is the mother of Bess.
- Elizabeth "Bess" Marvin is the best friend of Nancy Drew. In the series, Nancy Drew On Campus #1, Bess attends Wilder University with Nancy and George. While there is sexually assaulted at a fraternity party.
- Pam Miller is introduced in the 1995 novel, New Lives, New Loves, as the roommate of George Fayne. She is African-American, and athletic.

=== N ===
- Ned Nickerson is the boyfriend of Nancy Drew. He attends Emerson College, and plays football for the college team. In the 2020 comic series, Nancy Drew & The Hardy Boys: The Death of Nancy Drew, Ned is elected as Mayor of River Heights.

=== R ===
- Max Redd is introduced in the 2024 novel, What Disappears in Vegas.... He is the younger brother of Xavier, and plotted the kidnapping and attempted murder of Veronica.
- Xavier Leroy Redd is introduced in the 2024 novel, What Disappears in Vegas.... He is the owner of an extreme sports complex in Chicago, and is married to Veronica.
- Veronica Elena Redd (née Vasquez) was introduced in the 2024 novel, What Disappears in Vegas.... She is the Latina cousin of Bess and George. She became interested in extreme sports when she met Xavier.

=== S ===
- Effie Schneider is the niece of Hannah Gruen, she was introduced in Password to Larkspur Lane.
- Asa Sidney first appeared in the 1933 novel The Sign of the Twisted Candles. Asa Sidney is a 100-year old inventor. He is uncle of Louise Fayne and Anna Marvin. Asa was born in Liverpool-on-Tyne, (Note: Liverpool isn't actually located on the Tyne, but the book made the geographic error, so that is what's listed here.) England, and as a young boy he was sent to work for a chandler. For the first year, he carried wood and stoked fires to melt tallow. He was promoted to stirring and skimming hot grease. Under an agreement with his parents, Asa was to live with his employer until he turned 18-years old. At that time, he was to receive a new suit of clothes, money and a certificate as a candle maker. When he was 15-years old, he developed his first invention. It was a candle pierced lengthwise with four-holes, so the melted tallow would run down, instead of spilling over the candlestick. His employer took credit for the invention, and Asa ran away determined to get to America. He offered to work his way across the ocean, and the captain of a freighter took him up on the offer. In exchange, Asa worked as a helper in the galley. He found steady work in America, making candles.
- Carol Sidney was introduced in The Sign of the Twisted Candles as the deceased daughter of Asa and Jenny.
- Helen Sidney is the daughter of Jacob Sidney.
- Jenny Sidney (née Boonton) was the wife of Asa. Feeling neglected, she left her husband.
- Jacob Sidney is the nephew of Asa.
- Richard Spire is a local doctor in River Heights that makes house calls.

=== V ===
- Deanna Vasquez was introduced in the 2024 novel, What Disappears in Vegas.... She is the daughter of Elena and Rick, sister of Veronica, and cousin to Bess and George.
- Elena Vasquez was introduced in the 2024 novel, What Disappears in Vegas.... She is married to Rick, mother to Deanna and Veronica, and aunt to Bess and George.
- Rick Vasquez was introduced in the 2024 novel, What Disappears in Vegas.... He is married to Elena, and is the uncle to Bess and George.
- Kara Verbeck was introduced in the 1995 novel, New Lives, New Loves. She is assigned as Nancy Drew's roommate at Wilder University.

=== W ===
- Carol Wipple was introduced in the 1933 novel The Sign of the Twisted Candles. She is the orphaned daughter of Helen Sidney and John Boonton. She is the cousin of George and Bess. Asa Sidney left his fortune to her, and she then attended boarding school. When not at school, she splits her time living with the Fayne household, and the Marvin household.
