= The Flying Saucer Mystery =

Nancy Drew 58, published 1980

- Author: Carolyn Keene
- Cover artist: Ruth Sanderson
- Language: English
- Series: Nancy Drew Mystery Stories
- Genre: Juvenile literature
- Published: April 16, 1980
- Publisher: Wanderer Books
- Publication place: United States
- Media type: Print (hardback & paperback)
- Preceded by: The Triple Hoax
- Followed by: The Secret in the Old Lace

The Flying Saucer Mystery is the 58th volume in the Nancy Drew Mystery Stories series. It was written in 1980 under the pseudonym Carolyn Keene and published by Simon & Schuster under the Wanderer imprint. It was later republished in both Wanderer and Minstrel imprints, each time with a new cover. In 2005, Grosset & Dunlap reprinted it in the yellow hardback "glossy flashlight" format. The original edition cover and six internal illustrations were by Ruth Sanderson. These illustrations were removed in the two subsequent printings.

== Plot summary ==
Nancy Drew and her friends visit the Shawniegunk Forest in search of a mysterious flying saucer that is disturbing the locals. While they are working on this mystery, a naturalist who lives in the area asks them to help him search for a treasure left to him by his late father. They also must solve the mystery of a Native American man who mysteriously appears and disappears.

== Characters ==
INA version:

- Nancy Drew
- Carson Drew: Nancy's father
- Hannah Gruen: Nancy's family housekeeper
- Bess Marvin: Nancy's best friend
- George Fayne: Nancy's best friend, and Bess's first cousin
- Ned Nickerson: Nancy's boyfriend
- Burt Eddleton: George's boyfriend
- Dave Evans: Bess's boyfriend
- Mr Hal Drake: guide
- Mrs. Jan Drake: guide and Hal Drake's wife
- Joseph Austin (Old Joe): naturalist who lives in the forest
- Shoso: Native American who mysteriously appears and disappears
- Dr. Doyle: veterinarian
- Dr. Caffrey: Carson Drew's friend
- Dr. Halpern: chemical expert
- Dr. York: scientist
- Prof. Hendriks: botany expert
- Colonel Akon
- Major Tanner

=== Animals ===
- Susan B: Nancy's horse
- Goalpost: Ned's horse
- Trixie: Old Joe's dog
- Kitty: Old Joe's wildcat
