= Walter Karig =

American writer (1898-1956)

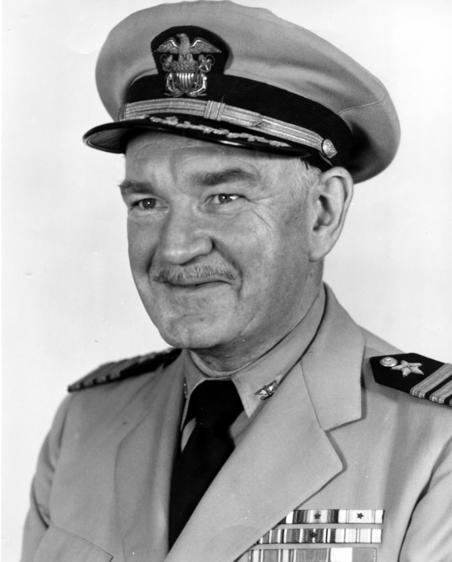
- United States Navy photograph of Captain Walter Karig, housed at the Harry S. Truman Presidential Library and Museum
- Born: November 13, 1898; New York City, U.S.
- Died: September 30, 1956 (aged 57); Bethesda, Maryland, U.S.
- Writing career
- Language: English
- Genre: Mystery
- Subject: Nancy Drew

Walter Karig (November 13, 1898 – September 30, 1956) was a prolific writer, who served as a US naval captain. Karig wrote a number of works on Allied naval operations during World War II. He also wrote scripts for the television series Victory at Sea. Besides his works on naval history, Karig was a journalist, a novelist publishing under his own name using pseudonyms too.

== Early life and education ==
Walter Karig was born in New York, New York on November 13, 1898. He was the son of Martin and Elsie (Ellis) Karig. He received his early education in schools of New York City, and studied art at the New York School of Fine Arts and Ecole Julien in Paris, France.

== Career ==
For the Stratemeyer Syndicate, Karig wrote volumes in the Perry Pierce series (2–4), Doris Force series (3–4), and Nancy Drew series (8–10). Karig did not seem to enjoy writing with the trio formula used by regular series ghostwriters. He brought back the chum Helen Corning from the earliest Nancy Drew books and featured her prolifically, while diminishing the roles of George Fayne and Bess Marvin. While one of the volumes features a detailed account of college football, his contributions to the series place a large emphasis on Nancy choosing clothing and describing articles she owns or purchases.

Karig revealed to catalogers at the Library of Congress he authored three Nancy Drew volumes, numbers 8, 9, 10, under the pseudonym of Carolyn Keene. This admission angered the series' "packager", the Stratemeyer Syndicate, who hid their ghostwriters behind syndicate-owned pen names. The publisher had no desire to reveal the true authorship of volumes in the various series. Stratemeyer's attorney threatened legal action against Karig for claiming authorship. Karig never again worked for the Stratemeyer Syndicate.

Karig wrote detective fiction under the name Keats Partick.

Among Karig's many novels is Zotz! (1947), a satirical story dealing with an archaeologist and linguist, Dr. John Jones. After deciphering an inscription on an ancient disk, Jones is imbued with deadly powers: Jones can merely point at an animal or human and they faint. If he utters the word "Zotz" while pointing his finger, the person or animal will die. Because the novel is set during World War II, there is a patriotic flavor to it. Also, much of the plot revolves around Jones' efforts to obtain an appointment to see President Franklin Roosevelt, with the hope that he can convince the President that the Allies can use his supernatural abilities to help the war effort. Karig wrote himself into the novel as a beleaguered naval officer working at a US Navy public information office, where dozens of people paraded by his desk daily trying to obtain appointments to meet with the "highest authority" in the United States government. Although Karig's novel is set in the then present, he manages to point out that humans have not changed much in millennia. Technology may have improved, but humans still have a strong desire to destroy and to kill. Thus Karig manages to blend a satire on wartime Washington D.C. bureaucracy with ethical questions related to the advent of the nuclear war.

The novel's name was inspired by Karig's meeting with a member of the Zotz family:

Some years back I met a man whose last name was Zotz. The strange name was from Austria or Bavaria where his ancestors came from. Immediately after hearing this name, it seemed a magic spell had been cast. I felt "Zotz!" possesses magic power, and thus the title of my novel was born. The meaning of this strange name was a mystery even the bearer could not solve. I tried to find more information on this. One noted family of the name was from Peoria, Illinois, one member of which, Alois Zotz, went on to found the "Deutsche Zeitung" Newspaper in America. When I finally learned that "Zotz" was the name of a Mayan bat god, I thought the proposed title of the book was perfect.

— Five Letters to Earl Brewster.

After Karig's death, director William Castle released a film version of Zotz! in 1962. The cast includes actors Tom Poston, Jim Backus, Margaret Dumont, Cecil Kellaway, and Louis Nye. The film deviates from Karig's authorial intents and becomes a vehicle for clever special effects.

During his life, Karig was a member of the New York Yacht Club. In Washington, DC, Karig was a member of the Cosmos Club, Gridiron, Carabao, National Press, and Circus Saints and Sinners.

Walter Karig died in Bethesda, Maryland, on September 30, 1956.

== Books written ==
=== Series ===
==== Battle Report (collaboration) ====
- Battle Report – Pearl Harbor to Coral Sea (1944)
- Battle Report – The Atlantic War (1946)
- Battle Report – Pacific War: Middle Phase (1947)
- Battle Report – The End of an Empire (1948)
- Battle Report – Victory in the Pacific (1949)
- Battle Report – The war in Korea (1952)

==== Nancy Drew (as Carolyn Keene) ====
- Nancy's Mysterious Letter (1932)
- The Sign of the Twisted Candles (1933)
- The Password to Larkspur Lane (1933)

==== Doris Force (as Julia K. Duncan) ====
- Doris Force at Raven Rock (1931)
- Doris Force at Barry Manor (1931)

==== Perry Pierce (as Clinton W. Locke) ====
- Who Opened the Safe? (1931)
- Who Hid the Key? (1932)
- Who Took the Papers? (1934)

=== Non-fiction ===
- Asia's Good Neighbor (1937)
- War in the Atomic Age? (1946)
- The Fortunate Islands: A Pacific Interlude (1948)
- Battle Submerged: Submarine Fighters of World War II (1951) in collaboration with Rear Admiral Harley Cope USN.

=== Detective fiction (as Keats Patrick) ===
- Death is a Tory (1935)
- The Pool of Death (1942)

=== Novels ===
- Lower Than Angels (1945)
- Zotz! (1947)
- Caroline Hicks (1951)
- Neely (1953)
- Don't Tread On Me (1954)

== See also ==
- Nancy's Mysterious Letter
