= The Clue in the Diary =

Nancy Drew 7, published 1932

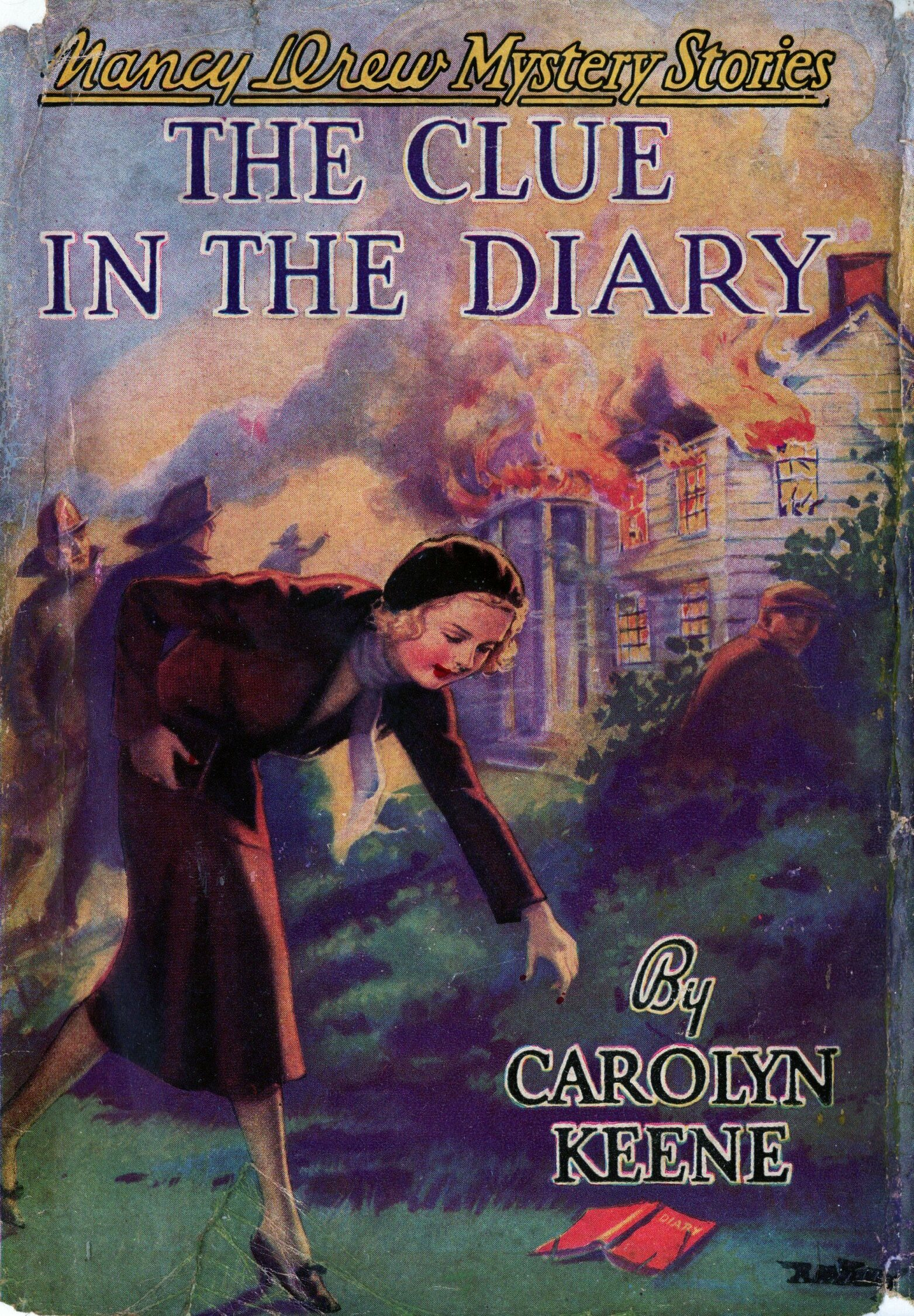
- Original edition cover
- Author: Carolyn Keene
- Illustrator: Russell H. Tandy
- Language: English
- Series: Nancy Drew Mystery Stories
- Genre: Juvenile literature
- Publisher: Grosset & Dunlap
- Publication date: 1932, 1962
- Publication place: United States
- Media type: Print (hardback & paperback)
- Pages: 174
- ISBN: 0-448-09507-6
- OCLC: 25734838
- Preceded by: The Secret of Red Gate Farm
- Followed by: Nancy's Mysterious Letter

The Clue in the Diary is the seventh volume in the Nancy Drew Mystery Stories series, and was first published in 1932 under the pseudonym Carolyn Keene. Its text was revised in 1962.

This is the last manuscript Mildred Wirt Benson wrote in her initial run. She would return for volume 11, The Clue of the Broken Locket, and remain with the series until 1948, then return for a final ghostwrite in 1953.

== Plot summary - 1932 edition ==
Nancy and her friends Bess and George, on their way home from a carnival, discuss a financially struggling Swedish immigrant, Mrs. Swenson, and her daughter, whom the girls have just helped to enjoy the carnival attractions by being their hosts for the evening.

As they are driving, a luxurious roadside estate bursts into flames. The girls park the car and make sure that no one is trapped inside. In doing so, Nancy sees someone fleeing the property, and discovers an anonymous Swedish diary on the ground. She picks up this clue, and as firefighters and gawkers arrive on the scene, she notices an attractive young man moving her car away from the flying embers. At first suspicious of Ned Nickerson, Nancy warms to him when he helps her out of a jam. Ned proves to be a good friend, and is a perennial admirer of Nancy's from then on. Meanwhile, Mrs. Swenson's husband is missing, and she identifies his diary as the one picked up at the fire. To top it all off, the owner of the burned house, Felix Raybolt, is missing, and his wife claims Joe Swenson has murdered her husband. Raybolt, it turns out, swindles inventors like Swenson out of their patents and copyrights, and used one such invention to start the fire.

== 1962 revision ==
This version tells essentially the same story, eliminating some detail and subplots, downplaying Nancy's initial response to Ned, eliminating a country club dance not essential to the plot, and adding a new subplot involving mail fraud. Adult series collectors have criticized the addition of a mail fraud subplot, taking place over only two chapters; its appearance does not advance the story and seems to serve as filler material for sections of descriptive but non-essential action deleted in the new edit. At the time of the 1962 revision, this plot device existed (and still exists) both here and in Nancy's Mysterious Letter, which is the next volume following, and serves as one of two equally important mystery plots in the story, and in The Hidden Window Mystery. Nancy struggles to decipher the diary and find the two missing men, aided by her best friends, and a new friend, the attentive Ned Nickerson.

== Artwork ==
The original edition featured an image of an immaculately dressed Nancy retrieving the title object, and four illustrations by Russell H. Tandy; he updated his own frontispiece to a pen and ink drawing for the 1943 imprint. The cover art for this volume has not changed since 1950, when the revision art was introduced by Bill Gillies, showing a very animated Nancy running after a suspect with the diary falling from her hand, a building burning behind her. The 1962 revision added internal illustrations, featuring line drawings of an immaculately dressed Nancy and chums sleuthing, and a frontispiece of Nancy in jeans spying on ruins at night. All of these drawings are present in editions published through 2009.

== See also ==
- Nancy Drew
