= The Secret in the Old Lace =

Nancy Drew 59, published 1980

Nancy Drew: The Secret in the Old Lace
- Author: Carolyn Keene
- Illustrator: Ruth Sanderson
- Cover artist: Ruth Sanderson
- Language: English
- Series: Nancy Drew stories
- Genre: Detective, mystery
- Publisher: Wanderer Books
- Publication date: October 31, 1980
- Publication place: United States
- Pages: 167
- ISBN: 0-671-41119-5
- Preceded by: The Flying Saucer Mystery
- Followed by: The Greek Symbol Mystery

The Secret in the Old Lace is the fifty-ninth volume in the Nancy Drew mystery series. It was ghostwritten by Nancy Axelrad and first published in 1980 under the pseudonym Carolyn Keene under the Wanderer imprint of Simon & Schuster. It was later republished again in both Wanderer and Minstrel imprints, each time with a new cover. In 2005, Grosset & Dunlap reprinted it in the yellow hardback "glossy flashlight" format. The original edition cover art and six internal illustrations were by Ruth Sanderson. These illustrations were removed in the two subsequent printings.

== Plot summary ==
Nancy enters a magazine competition with an answer to an old Belgian mystery of a missing nobleman. However, her manuscript is intercepted and someone else submits her same solution, so she must find out who it was and prove that the solution was indeed hers. Meanwhile, her friend Bess Marvin's mom has been sent a letter from her friend in Belgium, Madam Chambray. Madam Chambray recently bought an old house with a mystery attached, and she invites Bess, Nancy, and their friend George Fayne to come stay with her and solve the mystery. But on the way to Belgium, Nancy's suitcase is stolen. She and her friends continue to Madame Chambray's house, where the old woman tells them about a beautiful cross made of gold, diamonds, and Lapis Lazuli. It came when she bought the house and she does not know who owned it. While in Belgium working on these three mysteries, the girls are guided by their Belgian friend Hilda Permeke. They visit a lace center and learn how it is made. At a museum, Nancy is intrigued by a painting of a man on a bridge with a dark cloaked figure behind him (this painting appears on both of the covers pictured below). She later identifies the man as the missing Belgian nobleman, and solves the real-life mystery that the magazine contest was for. The valuable cross and suitcase and manuscript theft also tie in. The proof copy of this title was provided by Simon & Schuster and says Nancy's next case will be called "The Clue of the Ancient Mask". This was changed when the book went to print and the text remains the same but the title is changed to "The Greek Symbol Mystery".
