= The Swami's Ring =

1981 novel by Carolyn Keene

- First edition
- Author: Carolyn Keene
- Illustrator: Paul Frame
- Cover artist: Ruth Sanderson
- Language: English
- Series: Nancy Drew stories
- Genre: Detective, mystery
- Publisher: Wanderer Books
- Publication date: November 11, 1981
- Publication place: United States
- Media type: Print (hardback & paperback)
- Pages: 192 pp (first edition, hardback)
- ISBN: 0-671-42344-4 (first edition, hardback)
- OCLC: 7652827
- LC Class: PZ7.K23 Nan no. 61
- Preceded by: The Greek Symbol Mystery
- Followed by: The Kachina Doll Mystery

The Swami's Ring is the 61st volume in the Nancy Drew Mystery Stories series. It was first published in 1981 under the pseudonym Carolyn Keene. It was written by Nancy Axelrad.

The novel was the basis of the play Nancy Drew and the Swami's Ring by Laura Shamas, published in 1982.

== Plot summary ==
When Nancy Drew discovers an amnesia victim is carrying a royal Hindu ring, she is all the more determined to use her detective talent to identify him. At the same time, she is working on a mystery for a beautiful harpist.
