= Julia Meade =

American actress (1925–2016)

- Born: Julia Meade Kunze; December 17, 1925; Boston, Massachusetts, U.S.
- Died: May 16, 2016 (aged 90); Manhattan, New York, U.S.
- Education: Yale School of Drama
- Occupation: Actress
- Spouse(s): Oliver Worsham Rudd, Jr. (1952-1999) (his death)
- Children: 2 daughters

Julia Meade Kunze (December 17, 1925 – May 16, 2016) was an American film and stage actress who was a frequent pitch person in live commercials in the early days of television in the 1950s.

== Early years ==
Meade was born in Boston on December 17, 1925; her father sold typewriters and her mother was Caroline Meade, who was "the leading lady with Walter Hampden from 1923 to 1933."

She moved with her family to Glen Rock, New Jersey when she was 10 years old and was a member of the class of 1944 at Ridgewood High School, where she acted in school plays. She later graduated from the Yale School of Drama. Meade went to New York City and was hired as a model in 1948.

== Television ==
Meade came to public attention in 1953 as the public face of the Lincoln division of the Ford Motor Company. She did live commercials on The Ed Sullivan Show for such products as Kodak cameras and Life magazine for years, earning recognition from TV Guide as the "favorite salesgirl" of the program's host. Meade told Life magazine in 1960 that "I tackle commercials as though I were playing the queen in Hamlet".

Meade's pitch work involved doing live commercials that ran for up to five minutes, becoming most closely associated with her promotions of Lincoln automobiles, with her work for the car company described by Gerald Nachman as "part auto dealer, part chic sexpot".

Meade and Zachary Scott were co-hosts of Spotlight Playhouse, a summer anthology program on CBS in 1959.

From 1969-1971, she hosted the syndicated program Ask Julia Meade, a daily broadcast "in which she answered ... letters from the viewers" about family matters. In the mid-1970s, she had another syndicated program, Julia Meade and Friends, on cable television. She was a regular on Club Embassy on NBC in 1952 and on The Dennis James Show on ABC, 1952-1954. She also was a host of Playhouse 90 and appeared as a panelist on What's My Line? and Get the Message.

== Stage ==
Meade's work on Broadway included the 1954 production of The Tender Trap, Mary, Mary in 1962 and The Front Page in 1969. She also appeared in Roman Candle and Double in Hearts. After playing the lead in Mary, Mary for six weeks on Broadway, she went with the play's national company and acted the role for a year in Chicago, Illinois.

In 1969, Meade was a member of the cast of The Front Page that was featured on a record album produced by the Theatre Guild for mail-order distribution.

== Film ==
Meade appeared in the 1959 movie Pillow Talk, 1961's Tammy Tell Me True, 1962's Zotz!, and in Presumed Innocent in 1990.

== Recognition ==
Mead won the 1962-1963 Sarah Siddons Award for her performance in Mary, Mary.

== Death ==
Meade died at the age of 90 on May 16, 2016, in her home in Manhattan. She was married to Oliver Worsham Rudd, Jr., a commercial illustrator, from 1952 until his death in 1999. They had two daughters.

== Filmography ==
- Pillow Talk (1959) as Marie
- Tammy Tell Me True (1961) as Suzanne Rook
- Zotz! (1962) as Prof. Virginia Fenster
- My First Love (TV movie) (1988) as Chris Townsend
- Presumed Innocent (1990) as Moderator
