= The Mystery at the Ski Jump =

1952 book by Carolyn Keene

- Author: Carolyn Keene
- Language: English
- Series: Nancy Drew Mystery Stories
- Genre: Juvenile literature
- Publisher: Grosset & Dunlap
- Publication date: 1952
- Publication place: United States
- Media type: Print (hardback & paperback)
- Preceded by: The Clue of the Black Keys
- Followed by: The Clue of the Velvet Mask

The Mystery at the Ski Jump is the twenty-ninth volume in the Nancy Drew Mystery Stories series. It was first published in 1952 under the pseudonym Carolyn Keene. The actual author was ghostwriter Alma Sasse.

== Plot ==
Nancy, Bess, and George follow the trail of fur thieves to New York and into Canada. While trying to catch the thieves, Nancy must catch a woman named Mitzi Channing who is using Nancy's identity. Nancy finds out that everyone who has been buying from Mitzi is in a dreadful trap. In the climax to the mystery she is kidnapped by one of the criminals. He catches her spying on him in a wooded area. He grabs her from behind and claps his hand over her mouth to prevent her from screaming. Nancy has no chance of escaping from him. He ties her up and gags her, then carries his terrified prisoner deeper into the woods. There he leaves her in a locked cabin so she will starve. However, Nancy's friends are able to rescue her in the 11th hour.

== Publication ==
The novel was published in 1952 by Grosset & Dunlap. It was the 29th Nancy Drew novel, and was written by the ghostwriter Alma Sasse.
