= Carolyn Keene =

House pseudonym used by the Stratemeyer Syndicate

Purported signature of Carolyne Keene done by Harriet Adams

Carolyn Keene is the pseudonym of the authors of the Nancy Drew Mystery Stories and The Dana Girls mystery stories, both produced by the Stratemeyer Syndicate. In addition, the Keene pen name is credited with the Nancy Drew spin-off, River Heights, and the Nancy Drew Notebooks.

Edward Stratemeyer, the founder of the Stratemeyer Syndicate, hired writers, beginning with Mildred Wirt (later Mildred Benson), to write the manuscripts for the Nancy Drew books. The writers were paid $125 for each book and were required by their contract to give up all rights to the work and to maintain confidentiality.

Benson is credited as the primary writer of Nancy Drew books under the pseudonym Carolyn Keene. Harriet Adams (Stratemeyer's daughter) rewrote the original books and added new titles after the withdrawal of Benson.

Other ghostwriters who used this name to write Nancy Drew mysteries included Leslie McFarlane, James Duncan Lawrence, Walter Karig, Nancy Axelrad, Patricia Doll, Stan Bryon, Charles S. Strong, Alma Sasse, Wilhelmina Rankin, George Waller Jr., Margaret Fischer, and Susan Wittig Albert. Also involved in the Nancy Drew writing process were Harriet Stratemeyer Adams's daughters, who gave input on the series and sometimes helped to choose book titles; the Stratemeyer Syndicate's secretary, Harriet Otis Smith, who invented the characters of Nancy's friends Bess and George; and the editors at Grosset & Dunlap.

== Ghostwriters ==
=== Nancy Drew ===
1930–1957 (25 chapter text at Grosset & Dunlap/Stratemeyer Syndicate)
| # | Writer | Story | Year | Rev. | Revised by |
|---|---|---|---|---|---|
| 1 | Mildred Wirt Benson | The Secret of the Old Clock | 1930 | 1959 | Harriet Adams |
| 2 | Mildred Wirt Benson | The Hidden Staircase | 1930 | 1959 | Harriet Adams |
| 3 | Mildred Wirt Benson | The Bungalow Mystery | 1930 | 1960 | Patricia Doll |
| 4 | Mildred Wirt Benson | The Mystery at Lilac Inn | 1930 | 1961 | Patricia Doll |
| 5 | Mildred Wirt Benson | The Secret of Shadow Ranch | 1931 | 1965 | Grace Gote |
| 6 | Mildred Wirt Benson | The Secret of Red Gate Farm | 1931 | 1961 | Lynn Ealer |
| 7 | Mildred Wirt Benson | The Clue in the Diary | 1932 | 1962 | Harriet Adams |
| 8 | Walter Karig | Nancy's Mysterious Letter | 1932 | 1968 | Harriet Adams |
| 9 | Walter Karig | The Sign of the Twisted Candles | 1933 | 1968 | Patricia Doll |
| 10 | Walter Karig | Password to Larkspur Lane | 1933 | 1966 | Patricia Doll |
| 11 | Mildred Wirt Benson | The Clue of the Broken Locket | 1934 | 1965 | Grace Gote |
| 12 | Mildred Wirt Benson | The Message in the Hollow Oak | 1935 | 1972 | Grace Gote |
| 13 | Mildred Wirt Benson | The Mystery of the Ivory Charm | 1936 | 1974 | Priscilla Baker-Carr |
| 14 | Mildred Wirt Benson | The Whispering Statue | 1937 | 1970 | Harriet Adams |
| 15 | Mildred Wirt Benson | The Haunted Bridge | 1937 | 1972 | Priscilla Baker-Carr |
| 16 | Mildred Wirt Benson | The Clue of the Tapping Heels | 1939 | 1969 | Harriet Adams |
| 17 | Mildred Wirt Benson | Mystery of the Brass-Bound Trunk | 1940 | 1976 | Harriet Adams |
| 18 | Mildred Wirt Benson | Mystery at the Moss-Covered Mansion | 1941 | 1971 | Harriet Adams |
| 19 | Mildred Wirt Benson | The Quest of the Missing Map | 1942 | 1969 | Priscilla Baker-Carr |
| 20 | Mildred Wirt Benson | The Clue in the Jewel Box | 1943 | 1972 | Priscilla Baker-Carr |
| 21 | Mildred Wirt Benson | The Secret in the Old Attic | 1944 | 1970 | Priscilla Baker-Carr |
| 22 | Mildred Wirt Benson | The Clue in the Crumbling Wall | 1945 | 1973 | Priscilla Baker-Carr |
| 23 | Mildred Wirt Benson | Mystery of the Tolling Bell | 1946 | 1973 | Priscilla Baker-Carr |
| 24 | Mildred Wirt Benson | The Clue in the Old Album | 1947 | 1977 | Priscilla Baker-Carr |
| 25 | Mildred Wirt Benson | The Ghost of Blackwood Hall | 1948 | 1967 | Priscilla Baker-Carr |
| 26 | George Waller, Jr. | The Clue of the Leaning Chimney | 1949 | 1967 | Priscilla Baker-Carr |
| 27 | Margaret Scherf | The Secret of the Wooden Lady | 1950 | 1967 | Priscilla Baker-Carr |
| 28 | Whilemina Rankin | The Clue of the Black Keys | 1951 | 1968 | Priscilla Baker-Carr |
| 29 | Alma Sasse | Mystery at the Ski Jump | 1952 | 1968 | Ann Shultes |
| 30 | Mildred Wirt Benson | The Clue of the Velvet Mask | 1953 | 1969 | Priscilla Baker-Carr |
| 31 | Harriet Adams | The Ringmaster's Secret | 1953 | 1974 | June Dunn |
| 32 | Charles S. Strong | The Scarlet Slipper Mystery | 1954 | 1974 | Ann Shultes |
| 33 | Harriet Adams | The Witch Tree Symbol | 1955 | 1975 | Ann Shultes |
| 34 | Patricia Doll | The Hidden Window Mystery | 1956 | 1975 | Mary Fischer |
| 35 | Harriet Adams | The Haunted Showboat | 1957 | | |

1959–1979 (20 chapter text at Grosset & Dunlap/Stratemeyer Syndicate)
| # | Writer | Story | Year |
|---|---|---|---|
| 36 | Harriet Adams | The Secret of the Golden Pavilion | 1959 |
| 37 | Harriet Adams | The Clue in the Old Stagecoach | 1960 |
| 38 | Harriet Adams | The Mystery of the Fire Dragon | 1961 |
| 39 | Harriet Adams | The Clue of the Dancing Puppet | 1962 |
| 40 | Harriet Adams | The Moonstone Castle Mystery | 1963 |
| 41 | Harriet Adams | The Clue of the Whistling Bagpipes | 1964 |
| 42 | Harriet Adams | The Phantom of Pine Hill | 1965 |
| 43 | Harriet Adams | The Mystery of the 99 Steps | 1966 |
| 44 | Harriet Adams | The Clue in the Crossword Cipher | 1967 |
| 45 | Harriet Adams | The Spider Sapphire Mystery | 1968 |
| 46 | Harriet Adams | The Invisible Intruder | 1969 |
| 47 | Harriet Adams | The Mysterious Mannequin | 1970 |
| 48 | Harriet Adams | The Crooked Banister | 1971 |
| 49 | Harriet Adams | The Secret of Mirror Bay | 1972 |
| 50 | Harriet Adams | The Double Jinx Mystery | 1973 |
| 51 | Harriet Adams | Mystery of the Glowing Eye | 1974 |
| 52 | Harriet Adams | The Secret of the Forgotten City | 1975 |
| 53 | Harriet Adams | The Sky Phantom | 1976 |
| 54 | Harriet Adams | The Strange Message in the Parchment | 1977 |
| 55 | Harriet Adams | Mystery of Crocodile Island | 1978 |
| 56 | Harriet Adams | The Thirteenth Pearl | 1979 |

1979–1985 (20 chapter text at Simon & Schuster/Stratemeyer Syndicate)
| # | Writer | Story | Year |
|---|---|---|---|
| 57 | Harriet Adams | The Triple Hoax | 1979 |
| 58 | Harriet Adams | The Flying Saucer Mystery | 1980 |
| 59 | Nancy Axelrad | The Secret in the Old Lace | 1980 |
| 60 | Nancy Axelrad | The Greek Symbol Mystery | 1980 |
| 61 | Nancy Axelrad | The Swami's Ring | 1981 |
| 62 | Sharon Wagner | The Kachina Doll Mystery | 1981 |
| 63 | Nancy Axelrad | The Twin Dilemma | 1981 |
| 64 | Richard Ballard | Captive Witness | 1981 |
| 65 | Nancy Axelrad | Mystery of the Winged Lion | 1982 |
| 66 | James Duncan Lawrence | Race Against Time | 1982 |
| 67 | Richard Ballard | The Sinister Omen | 1982 |
| 68 | Sharon Wagner | The Elusive Heiress | 1982 |
| 69 | James Duncan Lawrence | Clue of the Ancient Disguise | 1982 |
| 70 | Sharon Wagner | The Broken Anchor | 1983 |
| 71 | James Duncan Lawrence | The Silver Cobweb | 1983 |
| 72 | James Duncan Lawrence | The Haunted Carousel | 1983 |
| 73 | James Duncan Lawrence | Enemy Match | 1984 |
| 74 | James Duncan Lawrence | The Mysterious Image | 1984 |
| 75 | Sharon Wagner | The Emerald-Eyed Cat Mystery | 1984 |
| 76 | Sharon Wagner | The Eskimo's Secret | 1985 |
| 77 | James Duncan Lawrence | The Bluebeard Room | 1985 |
| 78 | James Duncan Lawrence | The Phantom of Venice | 1985 |

== See also ==
- Franklin W. Dixon
