= The Secret at Shadow Ranch =

Nancy Drew 5, published 1931

The Secret of Shadow Ranch
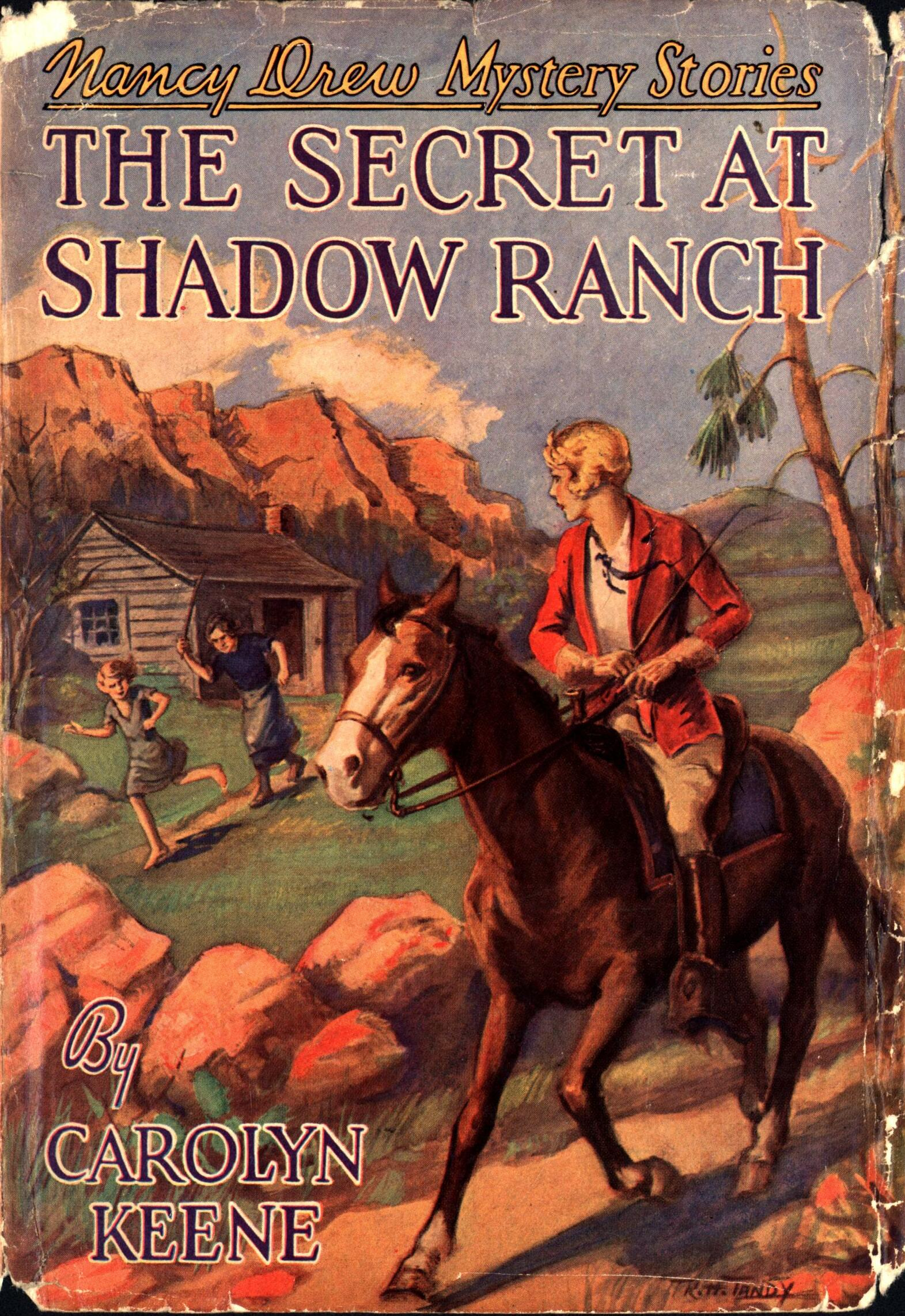
- Original edition
- Author: Carolyn Keene
- Illustrator: Russell H. Tandy
- Language: English
- Series: Nancy Drew Mystery Stories
- Genre: Juvenile literature
- Publisher: Grosset & Dunlap
- Publication date: 1931, 1965
- Publication place: United States
- Media type: Print (hardback & paperback)
- Pages: 175
- Preceded by: The Mystery at Lilac Inn
- Followed by: The Secret of Red Gate Farm

The Secret at Shadow Ranch is the fifth volume in the Nancy Drew Mystery Stories series. It was first published in 1931 under the pseudonym Carolyn Keene, and was ghostwritten by Mildred Wirt Benson. This book, as of 2001, ranks 50 on the list of All-Time Bestselling Children's Books, according to Publishers Weekly, with 2,347,750 sales since 1931.

== Plot summary - 1931 edition ==
This book introduces Nancy's best friends, Elizabeth "Bess" Marvin and George Fayne, complete opposites. George is a brave, sporty tomboy, while Bess is a girly, shopping, scaredycat. One of Bess and George's cousins, Alice Regor, traveled with Nancy to their Aunt and Uncle's ranch in Arizona where the cousins' aunt attempts to keep up a ranch she received as payment of a debt. Nancy reunites Alice with her long-lost artist father, who is suffering from amnesia. She also uncovers the mystery behind why an old mountain woman is guardian of a beautiful young girl, all the while enjoying mountain life, including horseback riding, a flash flood, being lost in the mountains overnight, and a dangerous mountain lion.

== 1965 revision ==
Nancy travels with her friends Bess and George to Shadow Ranch, near Phoenix, Arizona. The ranch is in danger of being shut down, and is threatened by a phantom horse that seems to bring destruction with it each time it appears. The girls soon become friends with the young ranch hands who help them. The discovery of a pocket watch with a hidden message about a green bottle and a pastel painting are her clues to find the lost treasure of Dirk Valentine. These clues lead her to an ancient Indian dwelling, a prisoner, a chest of gold hearts, a gang of thieves, and a lot of danger. The revised book had the title changed to "of" instead of "at," and doesn't expand the biographies of the cousins significantly. Whereas the ranch is depicted as somewhat slow, and a young doctor is interested in Nancy, the revision sees them involved in resort-town activities with men near their age.

== Artwork ==
Russell H. Tandy illustrated the original dust jacket and internal illustrations, and the frontispiece. In 1950, Bill Gillies revised the cover art, which featured Nancy on a rearing horse. The art was revised for the new story in 1965, this time by Rudy Nappi, and featuring the phantom horse.

== Adaptation ==
The tenth installment in the Nancy Drew point-and-click adventure game series by Her Interactive, named Nancy Drew: The Secret of Shadow Ranch, is based on the novel.

A mobile version for iPad, iPhone, and iPod Touch was also released under the Mobile Mysteries label.
