= The Message in the Hollow Oak =

Nancy Drew 12, published 1935

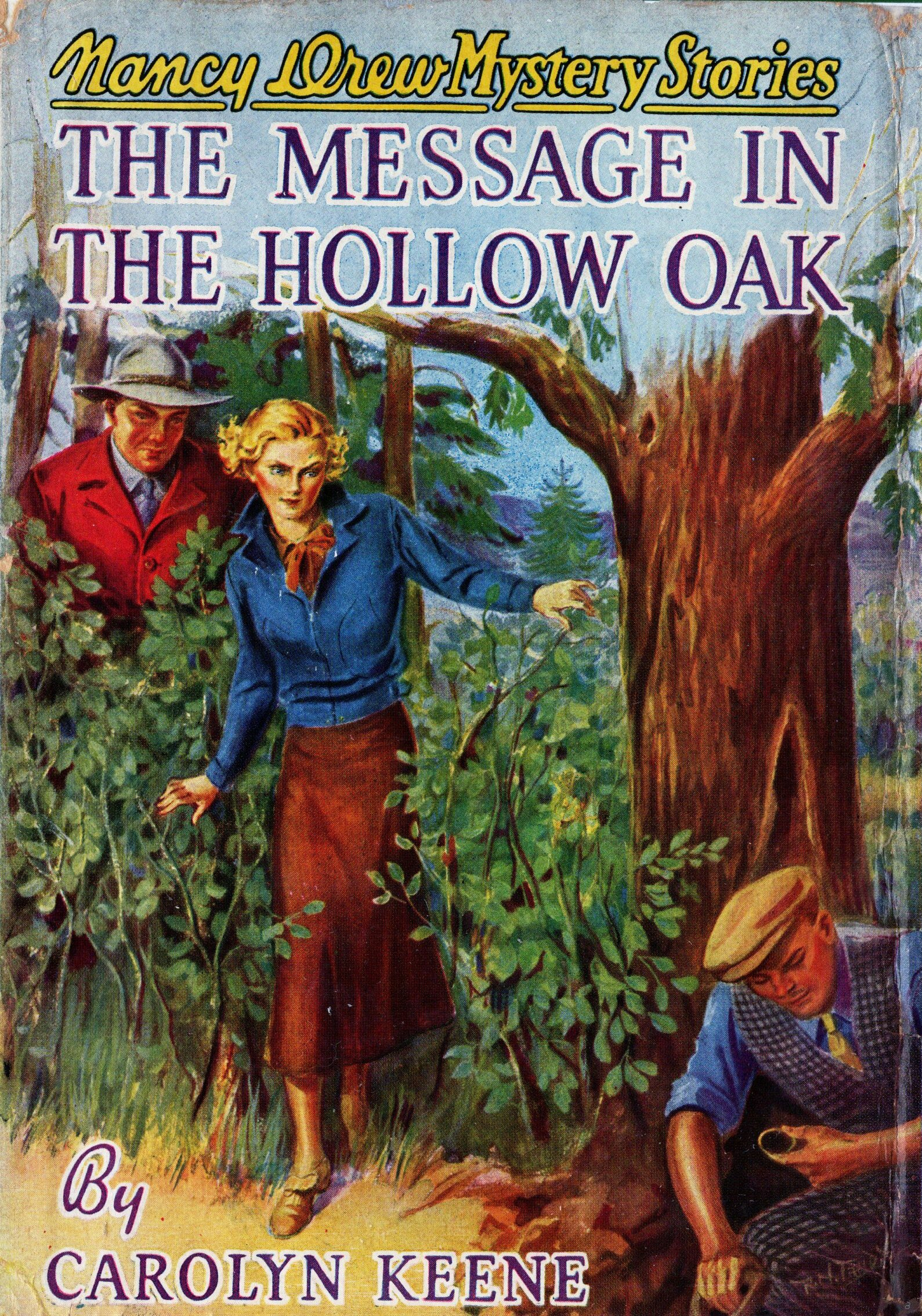
- Original edition cover
- Author: Carolyn Keene
- Illustrator: Russell H. Tandy
- Language: English
- Series: Nancy Drew Mystery Stories
- Genre: Juvenile literature
- Publisher: Grosset & Dunlap
- Publication date: 1935, 1972
- Publication place: United States
- Media type: Print (hardback & paperback)
- Preceded by: The Clue of the Broken Locket
- Followed by: The Mystery of the Ivory Charm

The Message in the Hollow Oak is the twelfth volume in the Nancy Drew Mystery Stories series. It was written under the pseudonym Carolyn Keene, and was first published in 1935.

== Plot summary – 1935 edition ==
Nancy Drew finds out that she has won a rather unusual prize in a contest, a piece of land in Canada. She takes a trip, her first outside of the United States, to see what her new property looks like.

As she is traveling by train to Canada, she meets an author named Ann Chapelle. Suddenly, the train crashes, and everything is thrown into confusion. Nancy and her two friends, Bess Marvin and George Fayne, are uninjured, but Chapelle is taken to a nearby hospital, gravely injured. When Nancy and her friends find her, Miss Chapelle tells Nancy the reason she was going to Canada, and asks a favor of her—to give a message to Miss Chapelle's grandfather, and to a lost love whom she hasn't seen since she ran away from home some years ago.

Along with this request, Nancy also has another problem: Two men have heard that there might be gold on Nancy's land, and are determined to get there first.

== 1972 revision ==
New York City detectives can't find a clue to a missionary's fortune, which is hidden in a hollow oak tree. Nancy goes to a burial site in Illinois that is connected to the mystery. She joins a college archeological dig near the Ohio River in Illinois and stays on site. Criticisms include the unlikely scenario of allowing Nancy such access and activity on the dig, since she is not enrolled in college and would not have skills or knowledge of the topic prior to her arrival.
