= The Secret of Red Gate Farm =

Nancy Drew 6, published 1931

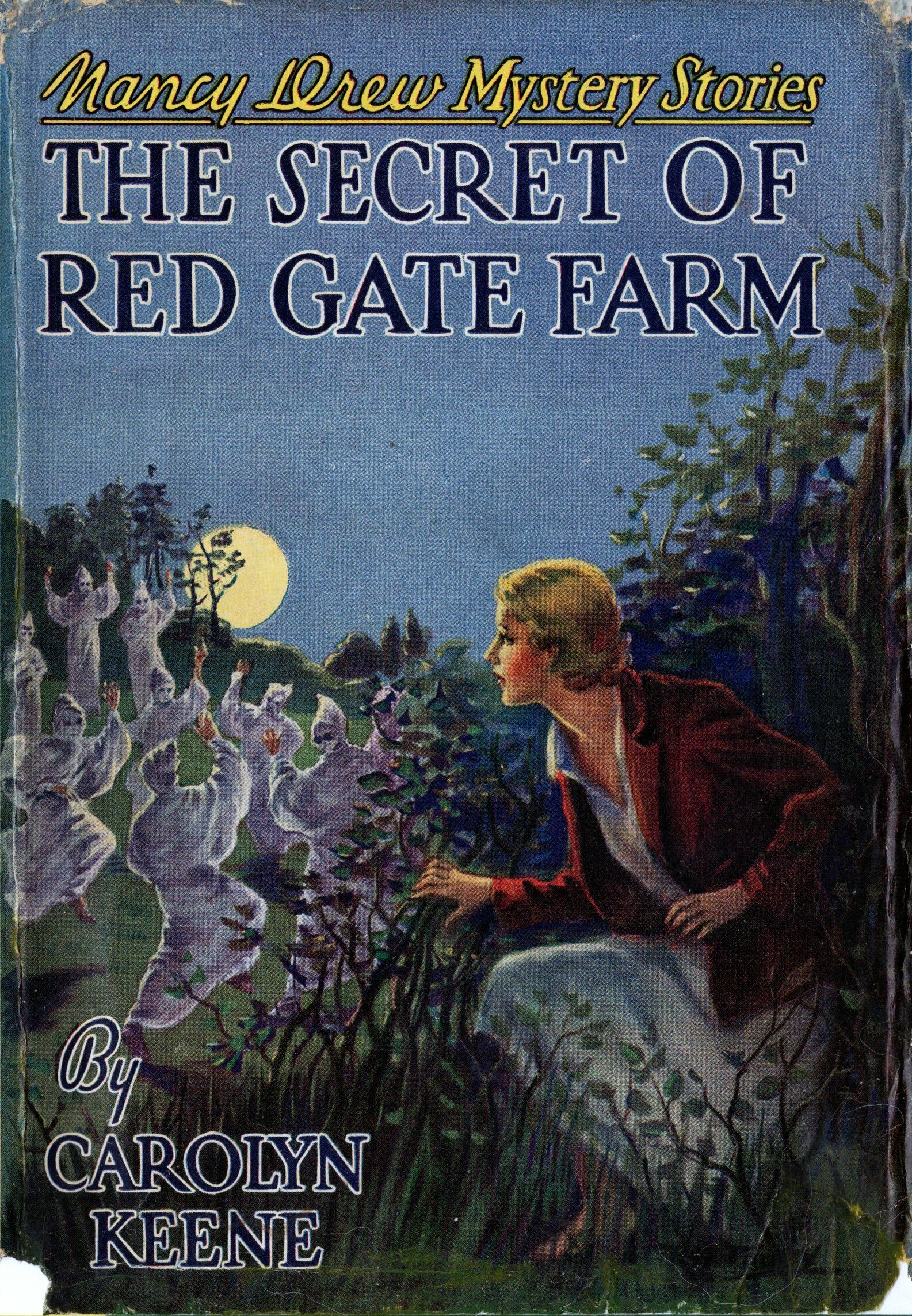
- Original edition cover
- Author: Carolyn Keene
- Illustrator: Russell H. Tandy
- Language: English
- Series: Nancy Drew Mystery Stories
- Genre: Juvenile literature
- Publisher: Grosset & Dunlap
- Publication date: 1931, 1961
- Publication place: United States
- Media type: Print (hardback & paperback)
- Pages: 188
- Preceded by: The Secret at Shadow Ranch
- Followed by: The Clue in the Diary

The Secret of Red Gate Farm is the sixth volume in the Nancy Drew Mystery Stories series, written under the pseudonym Carolyn Keene, It was first published in 1931.

== Front flyleaf ==
There is no front flyleaf for the 1989 edition of this book, which is the most recent edition.

== Plot summary - 1931 edition ==
Out on a leisurely shopping trip, Nancy, Bess and George encounter an odd French-Chinese perfume saleswoman, who is reluctant to sell a particular fragrance to Bess. On a return train trip to River Heights, they ponder her odd behavior and encounter the malnourished Millie (Joanne in the later versions of the book) Byrd, who is on her way to "the city" to seek employment. Millie becomes acquainted with the girls, and when Nancy accompanies her to a job interview, she uncovers a mysterious code in the office. Millie's grandmother, owner of Red Gate Farm, welcomes the trio and Millie to her farm where they plan to vacation as paid boarders, and assist with waiting on other boarders.

Once on the farm, Nancy uncovers a strange group called The Black Snake Colony—a "nature cult"—who are tenants on an outlying portion of Mrs. Byrd's farm. Accused of passing counterfeit money, Nancy shares details of the odd colony and the codes obtained in the office building with Federal agents. Nancy, Bess, George, and Millie go undercover disguised in the white robes and hoods worn by the cult members, and join them in their cave hideaway. This volume also serves to further develop the Bess and George characters, and their affectionate yet sometimes antagonistic relationship.

== 1961 revision ==
For the 1961 version of the book, the plot elements did not change much. Millie's name is now Joanne. George is bitten by a snake, and one of the federal agents is the son of a boarder at Red Gate Farm. Al Sniggs, gruff right-hand man of Maurice Hale, is now named Al Snead.

== Artwork ==
The original cover art and four illustrations were executed by R.H. Tandy. He updated his own frontispiece to pen and ink in 1943. In 1950, Bill Gillies introduced new art which was prominently featured in promotions and advertisements, as well as on one-half of Rudy Nappi's endpaper design, introduced in 1953. The iconic image is of Nancy spying on a cave from behind a tree. Because the story is nearly the same as the original version, the art was retained when the 1961 revision was introduced. It was never revised again, and remains in print as of 2009. Various editions have come under criticism from adult collectors, mainly because the costumes worn by the Colony members resemble KKK apparel.

== See also ==
“Outwitted—by that snooping kid!” Maurice Hale screamed. The thought seemed to unnerve the man completely.

— The Secret of Red Gate Farm, p. 172
- Scooby-Doo, Where Are You!
- Wayne's World
