= Nancy's Mysterious Letter =

Nancy Drew 8, published 1932

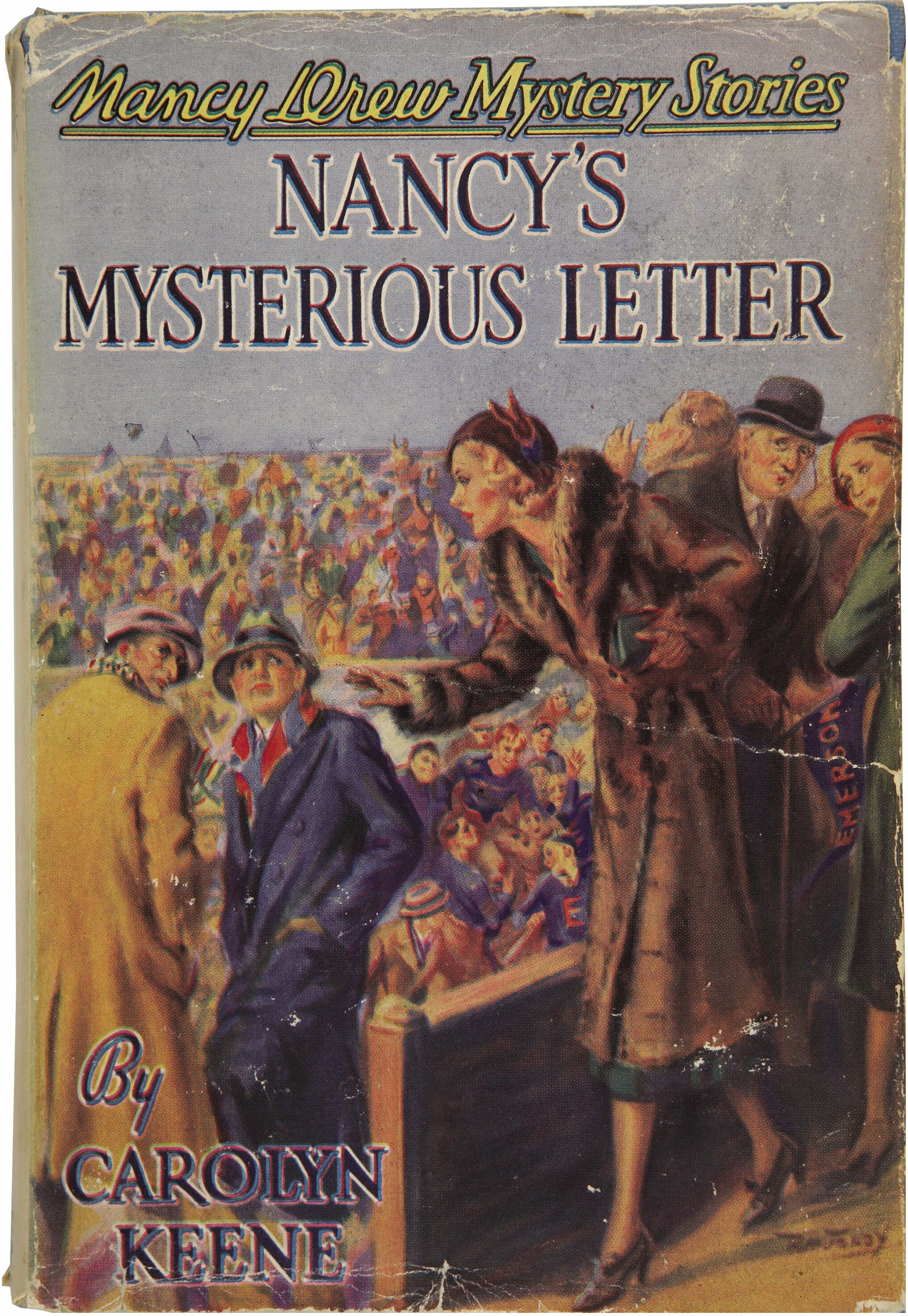
- Original edition cover
- Author: Carolyn Keene
- Illustrator: Russell H. Tandy
- Language: English
- Series: Nancy Drew Mystery Stories
- Genre: Juvenile literature
- Publisher: Grosset & Dunlap
- Publication date: 1932, 1968
- Publication place: United States
- Media type: Print (hardback & paperback)
- ISBN: 0-448-09508-4
- OCLC: 35978951
- Preceded by: The Clue in the Diary
- Followed by: The Sign of the Twisted Candles

Nancy's Mysterious Letter is the eighth volume in the Nancy Drew Mystery Stories series. It was first published in 1932 and was penned by Walter Karig, a replacement writer for Mildred Wirt Benson. Benson declined series work when the Depression forced a reduction in the contract fee provided to Stratemeyer Syndicate writers, so Karig, already an established Stratemeyer writer, took over the authorship. Due to Karig having died in 1956, the 1932 version passed into the public domain in Canada and other countries that have a life plus 50 policy, in 2007.

== 1932 edition plot summary ==
In the late autumn after returning from Red Gate Farm on a day trip, Nancy and her friends enjoy hot cocoa and a snack at teatime. Postman Ira Dixon, nearing retirement, is invited inside, and leaves his mailbag in the vestibule, where it is stolen.

Nancy is summoned by postal authorities, who accuse her of being involved in the theft, which threatens the postman's pension and career.

In the meantime, she is invited to spend a weekend as a guest of Ned Nickerson at Emerson College, where a big football game will take place, and she prepares for the trip. Nancy encounters low-brow Mrs. "Sailor" Joe Skeets, who accuses her of wrongdoing due to her own missing letter containing money, stolen with the mailbag. Strangely, the letters are re-posted later.

Nancy receives a letter from British solicitors informing her of a Nancy Smith Drew, sought as the heiress of an estate there. Nancy has no middle name or initial and she searches for her namesake. The primary suspect becomes Edgar Dixon, the half brother of her mail carrier, a flashy man in a yellow coat.

Mrs. Skeets provides a clue, as does George Fayne, and Nancy discovers her counterpart is visiting faculty at Emerson. Ned performs well in the big game, during which Nancy sees the suspect in the stadium. Nancy tries to make contact with Nancy S. Drew. While she investigates during an unexpected layover, she and Ned discover a lonely-hearts mail racket where money is solicited for introduction services.

Nancy saves the day for Miss Drew, and helps her avoid marriage to a crook, the dodgy Edgar Dixon, while exonerating Ira Dixon.

== 1968 edition plot summary ==
The revised edition is largely condensed, but employs the same plot. Sub-plots involving early snowfall adding days to the Emerson trip and Nancy's success at a hotel costume event are eliminated.

Ira Dixon becomes "Nixon," and the action is accelerated. Nancy still goes to Emerson, but her companion in the original version, Helen Corning, is changed to a new acquaintance. The action at Emerson now includes someone attempting to harm Nancy by releasing a heavy curtain after luring her to a deserted theater stage. Nancy is also waylaid at the airport while going there to find her namesake. The teen sleuth is lured into the wash room by a young woman who tells Nancy someone is sick. Once inside, the woman grabs Nancy and holds a chloroform-soaked cloth over Nancy's nose and mouth. Forced to breathe the anesthetic, Nancy faints into the woman's arms. The details involving the football game are modernized and abridged to reduce this story element.

== Artwork ==
The original 1932 artwork is by the fashion illustrator Russell H. Tandy, illustrator for the Nancy Drew series from 1930 to 1949.

Nancy is depicted chasing Edgar at the football stadium, with a glossy frontispiece of Nancy at the postal inspector's office and three glossy internal illustrations included in the original imprint. The frontispiece alone was used beginning in 1937, but the third plate, of Nancy, Nancy S. Drew, and Edgar was retained. Tandy updated this illustration to pen and ink on plain paper with 1940s hairstyles in 1943.

In 1950, Bill Gillies introduced cover art featuring a close-up of Nancy outdoors, with snow on the ground, examining a letter with a rather shocked expression on her face. This art was retained on all covers, including direct printed picture cover stock, until the 1968 text was introduced.

The revised cover art by Rudy Nappi shows Nancy in a pink suit with the letter in her hand and an overlay image of the letter on a blue background. An uncredited illustrator provided a frontispiece and five plain paper internal drawings featuring rare glimpses of the interior of the Drew home. The 1968 artwork remains unchanged in current imprints.

A 1973 Collins edition shows Nancy and another man at night, about to be struck by an oncoming automobile.
