= Jean Rasey =

American actress (born 1954)

- Born: September 19, 1954 (age 71); San Francisco, California, U.S.
- Education: American Conservatory Theater
- Occupations: Actress; model
- Years active: 1975-
- Known for: The Hardy Boys/Nancy Drew Mysteries; The Hindenburg

Jean Rasey (born September 19, 1954) is an American actress.

== Early life ==
Jean Rasey was born in San Francisco, California. She attended the prestigious American Conservatory Theater of San Francisco under scholarship for two years. She appeared in the theatrical production of Cyrano de Bergerac starring Marc Singer, Marsha Mason and Peter Donat. She also starred in smaller productions at A.C.T.

== Career ==
Upon moving to Los Angeles, California in the late 1970s, Jean Rasey landed the ingenue role of Valerie Breslau in the 1975 motion picture The Hindenburg, directed by Robert Wise. That was the film that launched her acting career. Rasey also was featured in the Universal motion picture “Rollercoaster” directed by James Goldstone.

Continuing her theatrical background, Jean Rasey, also understudied Stockard Channing in the role of Rosiland in Tony Richardson's theatrical production of Shakespeare's As You Like It at the Long Beach Arena Theatre.

Jean Rasey starred as George Fayne opposite Pamela Sue Martin's Nancy Drew in the ABC television series The Hardy Boys/Nancy Drew Mysteries. From 1975 to 1976, she starred and guest starred in various other network television shows, motion pictures, commercials and theatrical productions. Jean Rasey starred hundreds of national commercials most notably Rasey starred as Jill in Union 76 television advertisements for ten years in the 1970s and 1980s.

Jean Rasey was the lead actress in the 2011 short film Man Who Sold The World, written and directed by Jillian Acreman. Along with Rasey, the film stars Steve Railsback (The Stunt Man, Helter Skelter) and Barry Livingston (Ernie from My Three Sons).

In 2018, Rasey starred in the critically acclaimed web-series "Break A Hip," which won a 2018 Primetime Emmy for Outstanding Actress in a Comedy or Drama Short Form Series for its star, Christina Pickles. Rasey plays Brenda DeCarlo, the unscrupulous director of an assisted living facility. The role was written especially for Rasey by writer/producer, Steve Cubine.

== Filmography ==
=== Film ===
Year	Title	Role	Notes
1975	The Hindenburg	Valerie Breslau	Disaster film
1977	Rollercoaster	Girl in Line	
2012	The Man Who Sold the World	Lauren Carmichael	Short

=== Television ===
Year	Title	Role	Notes
1975	Archer	Peggy Lawrence	Episode: "The Vanished Man"
1976	Sara	Kathleen	Episode: "Reprieve"
1976	Visions		Episode: "Scenes from the Middle Class"
1977	The Hardy Boys/Nancy Drew Mysteries	George Fayne	7 episodes
1977	The Oregon Trail	Ellie Webster	Episode: "The Waterhole"
1978	Lou Grant	Gerry	Episode: "Pills"
1978	Barnaby Jones	Donna Austin	Episode: "Academy of Evil"
1979	Barnaby Jones	Elaine	Episode: "False Witness"
2018	Break a Hip	Brenda DeCarlo	Episode: : "The Home"
