= The Password to Larkspur Lane =

Nancy Drew 10, published 1933

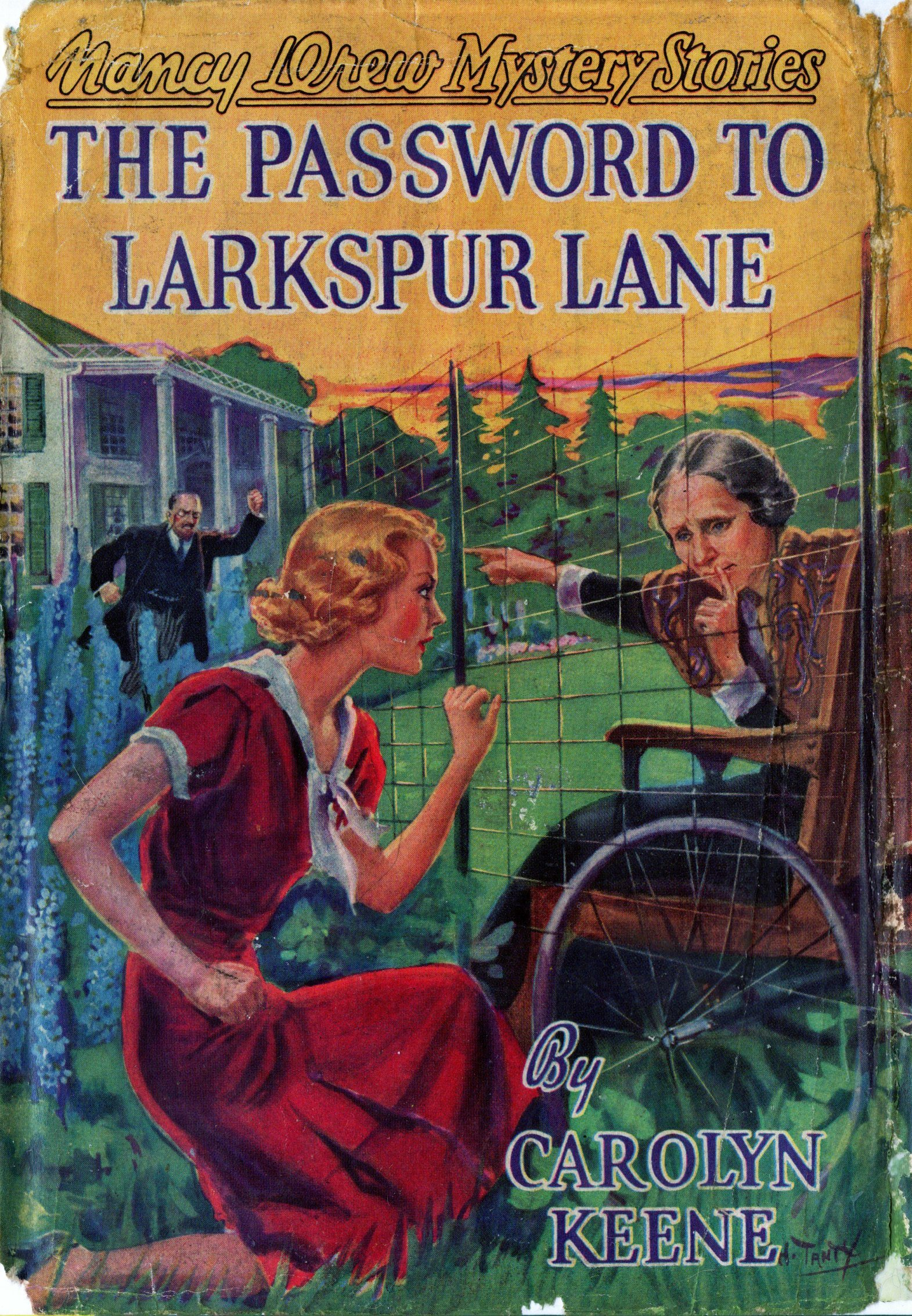
- Original edition cover
- Author: Carolyn Keene
- Illustrator: Russell H. Tandy
- Language: English
- Series: Nancy Drew Mystery Stories
- Genre: Juvenile literature
- Publisher: Grosset & Dunlap
- Publication date: 1933, revised 1966
- Publication place: United States
- Media type: Print (hardback & paperback)
- Preceded by: The Sign of the Twisted Candles
- Followed by: The Clue of the Broken Locket

The Password to Larkspur Lane is the tenth volume in the Nancy Drew Mystery Stories series. It was first published in 1933 under the pseudonym Carolyn Keene. The actual author was ghostwriter Walter Karig in his third and final Nancy Drew novel and his final appearance for the Stratemeyer Syndicate. Due to Karig's death in 1956, this book and his other two Nancy Drews, as of January 1, 2007, have passed into the public domain in Canada and other countries with a life-plus-50 policy.

== Plot summaries ==
=== 1933 edition ===
The story opens with Nancy tending her prize delphiniums when a mysterious carrier pigeon lands in her yard. Nancy contacts the registry for the carrier pigeon.

Meanwhile, housekeeper Hannah Gruen takes a fall and must be treated at the local orthopedist's office. Her attending physician, Dr. Spires, confides to Carson Drew and Nancy that he was forced to tend an elderly woman for her shoulder under peculiar circumstances: the driver of a car blindfolded him when they drove him there, so he would not be able to guess her location, but the doctor believes their destination might have been someplace called Larkspur Lane. Events led him to believe the patient was being held prisoner.

The only clue to the woman's identity is a bracelet with a family crest. Nancy, of course, sets out to track the crest, discovering it belongs to the Eldridge family of St. Louis.

In the meantime, the pigeon registry contacts Nancy about the bird, suspecting criminality is involved. Effie Schneider, a foolish girl who serves as Hannah's substitute, gets in on the action when Nancy attempts to track the carrier pigeon's flight into the country. A ferocious woman attacks Nancy and steals the bracelet from her. Due to threats of intruders and increasing danger, the Drews temporarily retreat and accept Helen Corning's invitation to visit Sylvan Lake.

Coincidentally, Nancy rescues a young Eldridge child from a mishap at the lake and learns that an elderly relative is missing. Nancy and Helen explore the vicinity, finally finding "L.S. Lane". Near the little-used road is an estate surrounded by delphiniums and an electrified fence. Elderly patients are outside on the grounds. Mrs. Eldridge is also outside near the fence and reveals she is indeed a prisoner.

Nancy and Helen disguise themselves as an old lady and her nurse, and enter using the password "singing horses". Nancy reaches Mrs. Eldridge and rescues her. She sends Eldridge safely away with Helen before being imprisoned by the evil doctor and his partners, who kidnap wealthy, elderly people and force them to sign over money and securities.

Nancy escapes from her cistern jail and sabotages the crooks' getaway airplane just as the police arrive.

=== 1966 revision ===
The word "The" is dropped from the title, and the front cover looks similar to the 1933 edition.

The plot is similar, although condensed. Bess and George are included in more of the action. A subplot involving supernatural events at Helen Corning Archer's in-laws' summer place on Sylvan Lake (ghostly blue wheels of rolling fire) leads Nancy there. The butler, Morgan, is involved in minor crimes as well. Bess accompanies Nancy in the rescue operation instead of Helen, with Bess dressing like a nurse and George the ailing party.

== Film adaptation ==
In 1938, the story was used as the basis for Nancy Drew, Detective, the first of four Nancy Drew movies starring Bonita Granville.

== Television ==
An episode of the Nancy Drew 2019 television series is named "The Lady of Larkspur Lane". In the episode, Nancy, Ned and George visit the local insane asylum which is named Larkspur Lane.

== Artwork ==
The original 1933 artwork is by the fashion illustrator Russell H. Tandy, illustrator for the Nancy Drew series from 1930 to 1949.

Tandy's original dust jacket artwork remained in print until 1962, long after most early volume dust jackets had been modernized for 1950s readers by illustrator Bill Gillies. The original art shows Nancy in a genuflection position wearing a very full, loose dress.

Collectors speculate publisher Grosset & Dunlap commissioned an updated illustration of the same scene during the transition from Gillies to new series artist Rudy Nappi in 1953. However, due to the presentation of Nancy posed crouching in a pencil skirt, the new painting may have shown an indiscreet display of her thigh where the slim skirt crept above Nancy's knees. Presumably, this was deemed inappropriate for American readers and the artwork was shelved. This art later appeared on British dust jackets for this volume in 1960.
