= Mystery of Crocodile Island =

Book by Harriet Adams under the pseudonym Carolyn Keene

- Author: Carolyn Keene
- Language: English
- Series: Nancy Drew Mystery Stories
- Genre: Juvenile literature
- Publisher: Grosset & Dunlap
- Publication date: March 10, 1978
- Publication place: United States
- ISBN: 0-448-09555-6
- OCLC: 3962224
- LC Class: PZ7.K23 Nan no. 55
- Preceded by: The Strange Message in the Parchment
- Followed by: The Thirteenth Pearl

Mystery of Crocodile Island is the fifty-fifth volume in the Nancy Drew Mystery Stories series. It was first published in 1978 under the pseudonym Carolyn Keene. The actual author was ghostwriter Harriet Stratemeyer Adams.

== Plot ==
Nancy responds to a friend's frantic call for help and she and her father travel to Crocodile Island in Florida with Bess and George to study the reptiles and try to uncover a group of poachers. Upon arriving, the group is kidnapped, but they escape and uncover a sinister plot involving many unsuspected victims.
