= George Fayne =

- Nancy Drew Mystery Stories character
- First appearance: The Secret at Shadow Ranch (1931)
- Created by: Edward Stratemeyer; Mildred Benson; Harriet Stratemeyer Adams
- Portrayed by: Jean Rasey (1977 TV series); Susan Buckner (1977 TV series); Joy Tanner (1995 TV series); Lauren Birkell (2002 TV film); Kay Panabaker (2007 film); Zoe Renee (2019 film); Leah Lewis (2019 TV series)

In-universe information
- Nicknames: George, sometimes even Fayne (everybody except her parents)
- Gender: Female
- Occupation: Student
- Family: Mr. Fayne (father); Louise Fayne (née Boonton) (mother); Scott Fayne (little brother); Sebastien Fayne (elder brother)
- Relatives: Ed Rawley (uncle, as seen in The Secret of Shadow Ranch); Bet Rawley (aunt, as seen in The Secret of Shadow Ranch); Bess Marvin (cousin)
- Nationality: American

Georgia "George" Fayne is a character in the popular Nancy Drew Mystery Stories series. She is one of Nancy's best friends and cousin of Bess Marvin. Her birth name is Georgia, although no one calls her that except her parents. (This is a change made in the 1980s; one volume, The Clue in the Old Stagecoach in 1960, mentioned her real name as Georgia on the title page, but this was altered after the first few printings. In the original novels, her name was simply George, named for her grandfather, with, depending on the ghostwriter, a chain of either boys or girls ahead of her.)

She is most frequently depicted with short brown hair and brown eyes. She is an athletic woman and is not easily scared when involved in Nancy's sleuthing. Her boyfriend is first a friend of Ned Nickerson's named Buck Rodman; she later dates Burt Eddleton. In the files series, she dates Jon.

== History ==
George and Bess were introduced in The Secret at Shadow Ranch. In the Nancy Drew Girl Detective Series, she has a little brother named Scott. In the original version of The Ringmaster's Secret, she has a nephew, indicating there are other siblings. A change in ghostwriters in 1933 resulted in George and her cousin Bess both being indicated as only children; their siblings, if there are any, are omitted from a will where their names are read. This can be explained in the text by assumption that they were the only children of their mothers known to their benefactor personally (The Sign of the Twisted Candles). With Nancy, George and Bess encountered an elderly man who was a distant relation and showed friendliness and compassion toward him. As such, they may have been named; it was an oddity in the series.

In the original series, George is a somewhat forward girl, and often less than proper in her demeanor and mannerisms. This, combined with a propensity toward clumsiness or danger-prone behavior, results in the title of "George the Terrible" among adult collectors. She is clearly feminine, though, despite her dress and mannerisms—when criticizing Bess for shopping habits, she is reminded she purchased several dresses, stockings, and a hat herself, and she shows concern for keeping her new silver pumps free of scuffs from clumsy dancing partners in one story. Her character becomes less outspoken in later volumes and in revised stories, but is still prone to accidents as the series progresses, usually due to her blind determination and tunnel vision; charging ahead, she often falls into holes, water or ponds, or turns an ankle, sidelining her at times, forcing more active participation from Bess in aiding Nancy.

In the 1940s, The Secret in the Old Attic states that she cuts her hair short, but only as much as the current styles permit. George is described as wearing dresses and skirts into the 1950s, but ones which are tailored and simple in appearance, and contrasted with fussier costumes worn by Bess. Nancy, Bess and George all participate in a variety of outdoors and sports activities, including horseback riding, swimming, hiking, golf, sailing and tennis. She is depicted as having less talent in the arts than her friends, and may serve as a dancing school receptionist or a crew member in their theater group instead of taking part on stage. Showing that even George can be intimidated, The Clue of the Velvet Mask shows a psychologically battered George; she is kidnapped while posing as Nancy, drugged and threatened by a gang of ruthless, dangerous criminals, who not only commit robberies but also repeatedly drug and physically assault Nancy and her friends; George overcomes her mania in time to step forward and save her friends in the psychological moment.

By the mid-1960s, she has learned judo and helps Nancy when the boys are not around to defend the trio of female friends by using her martial arts as self-defense. By the 1970s, her character is more endearing, and she wins many athletic competitions. In the 1980s, she is still athletic, but less of a tomboy, and by the time of the paperback series, is responsible, holding a part-time job in several of the stories. Interior illustration artists Ruth Sanderson and Paul Frame depict the character with bobbed, permed hair, simpler than her friends, but not really short in comparison. This incarnation also essentially dresses the same as Bess and Nancy, with the preppy dominated skirts, clogs, and polo shirts of the decade. George is much more adventurous than her cousin, but has evolved entirely away from the rude girl of the earliest stories, and is responsible, often kept out of the action by prior athletic commitments or by part-time jobs; she is the only one of the three main female characters who works independently, instead of securing jobs temporarily to investigate clues.

George is re-imagined as a lesbian in the 2018 comic, dating a girl named Danica, or Dan. It is published by Dynamite Comics.

Theorists state that George and Bess form opposite personalities in female adolescence, with Nancy as a combination of the extremes to balance the feminine ideal, a formula found in other female trio fiction (Charlie's Angels, The Mary Tyler Moore Show, The Powerpuff Girls).

== Portrayals ==
Actresses Jean Rasey and Susan Buckner portrayed George in The Hardy Boys/Nancy Drew Mysteries TV series of the late 1970s. The original characterization was a combination of the sleuthing pal George and the timid Bess, and Rasey wore her hair long. The character evolved somewhat, but remained less forceful than the George of the book series.

The producers of the 2007 film cast Kay Panabaker in the role of George, though both George and her cousin Bess appeared only briefly at the beginning.

In the 1995 Canadian/French syndicated half-hour Nancy Drew series, George was played forcefully by Joy Tanner. This series lasted only one season and portrayed Nancy, Bess and George at college.

In the 2002 TV film, George was played by Lauren Birkell. This film also had Nancy and her chums attending college. It was intended as a pilot to a new series, but was not picked up.

In a 2016 CBS pilot based loosely on the original characters, George was scheduled to be played by Vanessa Ferlito.

George is portrayed by Zoe Renee in the 2019 film Nancy Drew and the Hidden Staircase.

In the 2019 CW series, George, whose family name is changed to Fan, is played by Leah Lewis. This version of George comes from a family of Asian spiritualists.
