= Zotz! =

1962 film by William Castle

- Directed by: William Castle
- Written by: Walter Karig; Ray Russell
- Produced by: William Castle
- Starring: Tom Poston; Julia Meade; Jim Backus; Fred Clark; Cecil Kellaway
- Cinematography: Gordon Avil
- Edited by: Edwin H. Bryant
- Music by: Bernard Green
- Distributed by: Columbia Pictures
- Release date: October 3, 1962
- Running time: 87 minutes
- Country: United States
- Language: English

Zotz! is a 1962 American fantasy comedy film produced and directed by William Castle, and starring Tom Poston, Julia Meade, Jim Backus, Fred Clark, and Cecil Kellaway. It is about a man obtaining magical powers from a god of an ancient civilization. It is based on Walter Karig's 1947 novel.

== Plot ==
A brilliant but peculiar professor of Ancient Eastern languages, Jonathan Jones, finds that an amulet sent to his niece Cynthia by a boyfriend from an archeological dig has magical powers.

Whoever has the amulet in their possession gains three abilities: cause great pain by pointing at another living creature, slow time for the target(s) by saying the word "Zotz!", or instantly kill the target by simultaneously pointing and saying "Zotz!". Both government and Communist agents immediately develop an interest in the amulet's possible military use.

In the meantime, Jones and rival professor Kellgore are both in line for a promotion to take over from retiring Dean Updike as head of this California university's language department. A new colleague and possible romantic interest, Professor Fenster, is startled by Jones's behavior, particularly at a party thrown by Updike's wife that turns into chaos. Near the end of the movie, Jones refers to Fenster as Mrs. Jones, implying that they were either already married, or that they were going to get married soon.

Professor Fenster's first appearance occurs moments after Jones first mentions the name of Zotz in one of the early scenes of the movie. She is standing naked just outside one of the windows of his home during a thunderstorm that Jones unintentionally caused when he mentioned Zotz. Shocked and embarrassed by her nakedness, he quickly closes the window on her. Feeling somewhat sorry for her, though, he waves her over to go to the front door. Shortly after Jones hands her his suit coat so that she could maintain her modesty, he temporarily permits her to come into the house. When firmly asked by Jones to leave, so as not give the wrong immoral impression to his niece who is asleep upstairs in her bedroom, Fenster refuses to go back out into the storm half-naked. Fenster emphatically explains to Jones, in hope that he would sympathize with her, that she was "hurrying along, trying to beat out this sudden storm," when she was apparently struck by lightning. Moreover, she also tells Jones that her clothes were blown off by the electrostatic charge embedded within the bolt that hit her. After listening to her seemingly "far-fetched" story, he mentions that he remembers hearing about an actual incident where someone's clothes were literally torn from their body as a direct result of being struck by lightning. Finally realizing that she is telling the truth, Jones lends Fenster some of his niece's clothes. Now, fully clothed and armed with an umbrella that Jones also lends her, Fenster opens the door to brave the elements and goes home. The storm is, however, now over and the umbrella is no longer needed.

== Cast ==
- Tom Poston as Professor Jonathan Jones
- Zeme North as Cynthia Jones
- Julia Meade as Professor Virginia Fenster
- Jim Backus as Professor Kellgore
- Cecil Kellaway as Dean Updike
- Margaret Dumont as Persephone Updike
- Fred Clark as General Bullivar
- Louie Nye as Hugh Fundy (uncredited)

== Promotion ==
During the initial theatrical run, theater patrons received a full-size plastic replica of the amulet as a promotional item. In color, size and design, the replicas were essentially identical to the film amulet, with the additional feature of a small hole drilled at the top, for a key chain.

== Home media ==
On October 20, 2009, Zotz! was released on DVD by Sony Pictures as part of The William Castle Collection box set.

Zotz! released on blu-ray from Indicator/Powerhouse Films in the US and UK on 20 May 2024.

== See also ==
- List of American films of 1962
