= The Clue of the Broken Locket =

Nancy Drew 11, published 1934

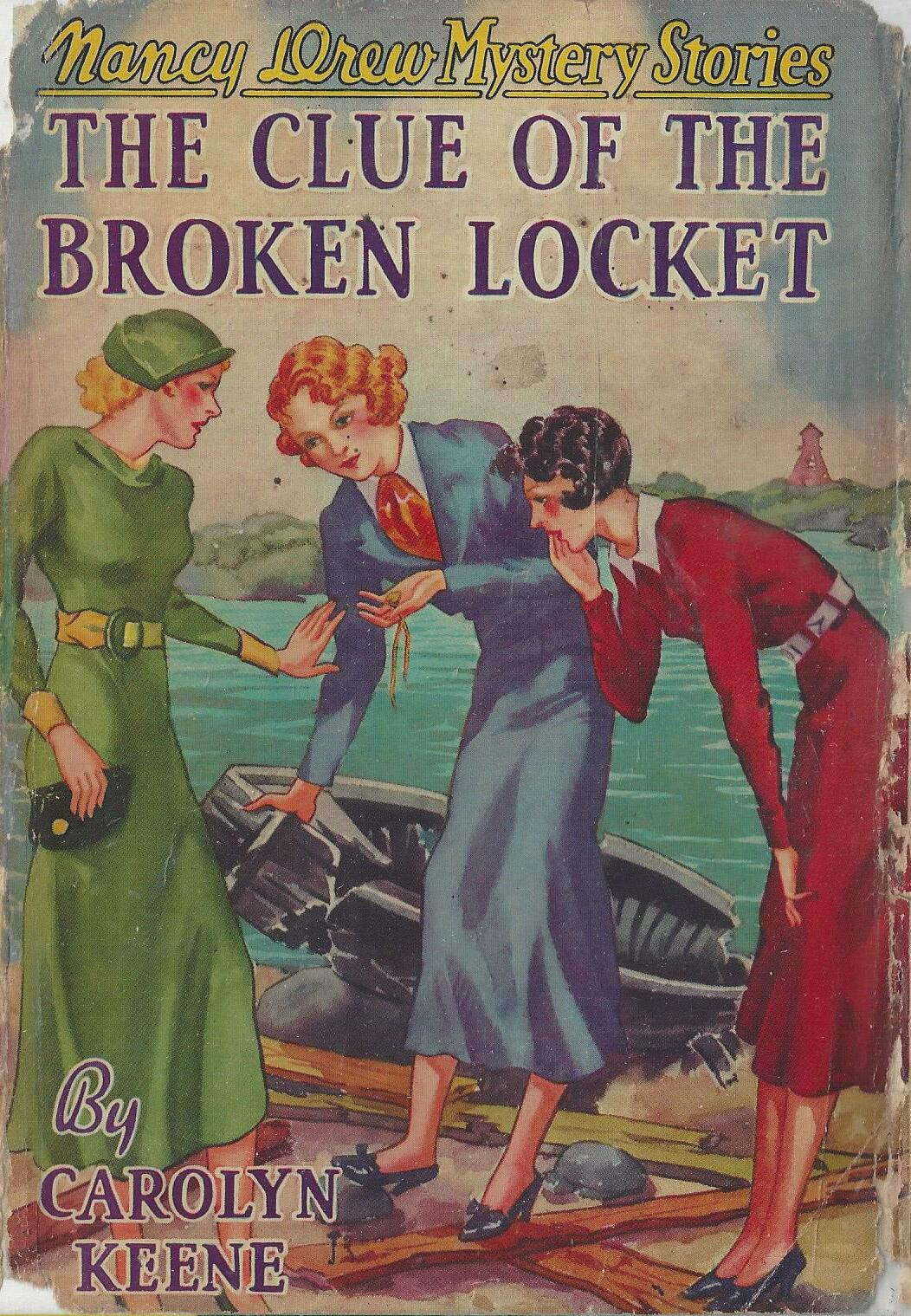
- Original edition cover
- Author: Carolyn Keene
- Illustrator: Russell H. Tandy
- Language: English
- Series: Nancy Drew Mystery Stories
- Genre: Juvenile literature
- Publisher: Grosset & Dunlap
- Publication date: 1934, 1965
- Publication place: United States
- Media type: Print (hardback & paperback)
- ISBN: 0-448-09511-4
- OCLC: 30575608
- Preceded by: The Password to Larkspur Lane
- Followed by: The Message in the Hollow Oak

The Clue of the Broken Locket is the eleventh volume in the Nancy Drew Mystery Stories series. It was first published in 1934 and was written by Mildred Benson under the pseudonym Carolyn Keene. It was later revised by Harriet Stratemeyer in 1965, and the story was mostly changed with a few elements of the original.

== Plot summary (1934 edition) ==
The book starts with Nancy Drew witnessing a couple named Kitty and Johnny Blair who adopt two baby twins, Jay and Janet Nicole, from the Selkirk Foundling’s Home. The babies were mysteriously found in a boat along the river by a nurse at the Home. The Blairs, who are famous actors, decide to adopt the babies as a publicity stunt, as they hope to raise the children as actors, which will help their own careers. The Blairs are cruel to the children, and Nancy sets off to find their real mother and take them away from the Blairs, although the adoption papers have already been signed.

Nancy and Bess are invited to a party at Blair’s estate, Jolly Folly, where Mrs. Blair decides to burn a package of clothes and an old broken locket that came with the children. Nancy, with the help of Hannah Gruen, substitutes the original clothing and locket with some of her old doll clothes and an old locket. She takes Janet and Jay’s original clothing and locket with her for investigation.

Nancy is suspicious of Blair’s maid, Colleen, and their chauffeur, Rodney. Colleen, who was put in charge of the twins, is unfit to care for them. She spends most of her time with her boyfriend, Francis Clancy, and trying on Mrs. Blair’s fancy gowns. Nancy, Bess, and George are disgusted at the girl's actions, although they help her out of many problems. Meanwhile, Edwin McNeely, a theatre producer, tries to get the Blairs to sign a contract requiring them to give up the babies and attend more rehearsals in exchange for parts in his upcoming play. He tells Nancy about his wife, who left him because he wanted her to keep acting when she wanted to start a family.

While Nancy and Bess are taking the twins for a stroll on the Blair estate, they see a mysterious woman come up to the twin’s carriage and kiss them. Nancy and Bess try to chase her but do not succeed. Nancy later tracks down the woman, Ruth Brown, and identifies her as Rodney’s sister and the nurse who found the twins on the river and took care of them while they were at the Selkirk Home. Nancy happily reunites Ruth and Rodney Brown, and Ruth moves in with the Blairs to take care of Janet and Jay when Colleen is discharged.

Nancy, meanwhile, tracks down a man named Enos Crinkle, who shows her the boat the twins were found in. She, Bess, and George find the other half of the broken locket, which bears the initials S. M. N. This scene is portrayed on the cover.

This angers Colleen, and the maid plants Mrs. Blair’s valuable locket in Nancy’s car, in an attempt to get her arrested. Nancy, however, outsmarts her and goes with Bess and George to a cabin along the river. There, Nancy finds the twin’s real mother, who turns out to be Sylvia McNeely, Edwin McNeery’s wife, and Jay and Janet’s mother. The twins are restored to the McNeerys and choose to employ Ruth and Rodney Brown as their nurse and chauffeur. The Blairs sign away their adoption of the twins, fleeing the country to escape creditors.

== 1965 revision ==
The revised 1965 imprint features two separated cousins and takes place in Maryland. A ghostly launch appears on a nearby lake, and two twin children are missing! The mysterious Pudding Stone Lodge seems to harbor many secrets that have a lot to do with the cousins and are very important to Nancy. Nancy invites Ned and his friends to come to the lake to help.

== Artwork ==
The cover art for the original dust jacket is uncredited. Russell H. Tandy drew the frontispiece and original three internal illustrations for the volume in 1934. A facsimile of this edition is available from Applewood Books and was published in 1998. In 1950, the cover art was modernized by Bill Gillies. In 1962 the cover art was modernized again, by Rudy Nappi, who put Enos Crinkle on the cover. In 1965, when the story was revised, Nappi made another cover, in print today, showing a dark lake, with Nancy, Bess, and George discovering the title object while wading to a ruined boat. Although the story had changed, this most recent cover depicts the same scene as the previous three. The revision was updated with interior line drawings throughout the book.
