= The Sign of the Twisted Candles =

Nancy Drew 9, published 1933

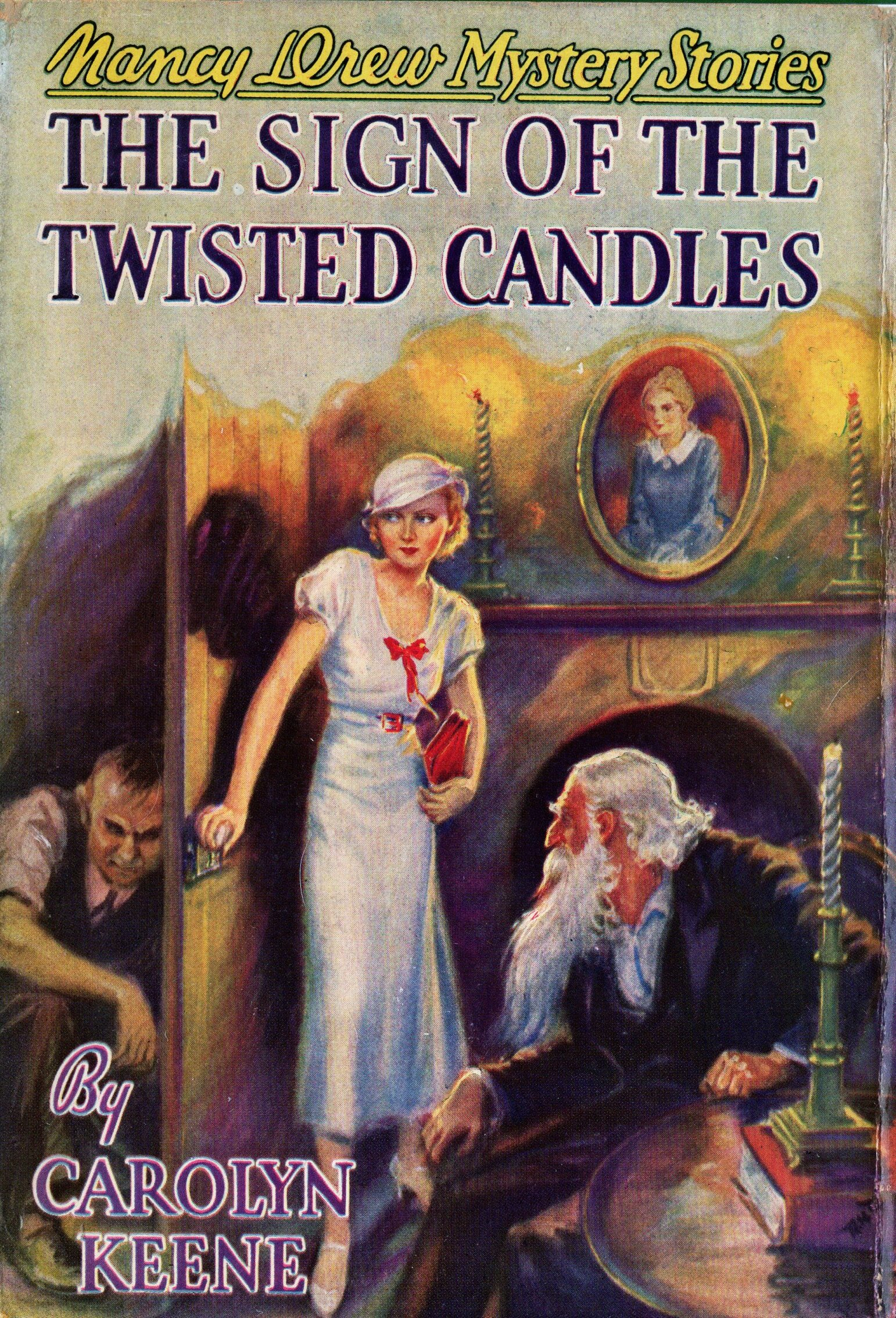
- Author: Carolyn Keene
- Illustrator: Russell H. Tandy
- Language: English
- Series: Nancy Drew Mystery Stories
- Genre: Juvenile literature
- Publisher: Grosset & Dunlap
- Publication date: 1933, revised 1968
- Publication place: United States
- Media type: Print (hardback & paperback)
- Preceded by: Nancy's Mysterious Letter
- Followed by: The Password to Larkspur Lane

The Sign of the Twisted Candles is the ninth volume in the Nancy Drew Mystery Stories series. As the second volume written by Walter Karig, it was originally published in 1933 under the pseudonym Carolyn Keene. Due to Karig having died in 1956, as of January 1, 2007, the 1933 book and the other two Nancy Drew books he wrote, have passed into the public domain in Canada and other countries with a life-plus-50 policy.

== Plot summary ==
In the course of solving the mystery of an old man's disappearing fortune, Nancy both starts and ends a family feud and reveals the identity of an orphan of unknown parentage. This story focuses on Nancy's encounter with a 100-year-old man at The Sign of the Twisted Candles, a roadside inn and restaurant. Nancy and her friends, Bess and George, take afternoon tea there while waiting out a storm, where Nancy's roadster is blocked by a fallen tree. They encounter Asa Sidney, celebrating his 100th birthday, and the maid and waitress, Carol Wipple, mistreated by her adoptive parents, Frank and Emma Jemmit.

Nancy discovers Mr. Sidney is an elderly relative of Bess and George, and her willingness to communicate with him launches a family feud upon his death a few days later. This leaves Nancy without allies in the family, as the cousins refuse to associate with her.

Carol is named as the major benefactress, and Nancy sets out to prove Frank and Emma Jemmit have misappropriated property. Nancy also must discover why Asa was interested in young Carol. Meanwhile, relatives from the Sidney and Boonton families fight over the money.

While investigating, Nancy is reunited with her friends. Later, during the climax of the book, she is nearly killed when pushed from a ladder that had been laid against a tower window, illustrated in the original 1933 edition. Carol is discovered to be the great-niece of Asa Sidney; therefore she owns the rights to a number of inventions awaiting patents from Sidney. The family feud is resolved due to Nancy's discoveries.

== Artwork ==
The original 1933 artwork is by the fashion illustrator Russell H. Tandy, illustrator for the Nancy Drew series from 1930 to 1949.

In the original edition, Nancy is shown meeting with Mr. Sidney in a simple summer dress and hat. This edition is noted for its internal art depicting Nancy pushed from a ladder. This illustration and two others were dropped in 1936 and subsequent editions.

Bill Gillies' 1950 cover art shows Nancy watching from a window as Frank Jemmit digs a hole outside. A more simply executed version of this image was used for half of the endpaper used from 1953 to 1959 (known as the 'Digger' endpaper). The endpapers show the digging man, while Nancy (in art adapted from The Secret of Red Gate Farm) hides behind a tree and watches.

The 1968 cover art shows a flip-haired Nancy near a candle with Asa glowering in the background. This art was also used as generic cover stock, in red, blue, and pink, for library binding or rebound library copies of all titles in the series.
