= Zotz (surname) =

Zotz is a surname. Notable people with the surname include:

- Birgit Zotz (born 1979), Austrian writer and cultural anthropologist
- Lothar Zotz (1899–1967), German archaeologist and prehistorian
- Volker Zotz (born 1956), Austrian philosopher
