= Ruth Sanderson =

American illustrator and writer of children's books

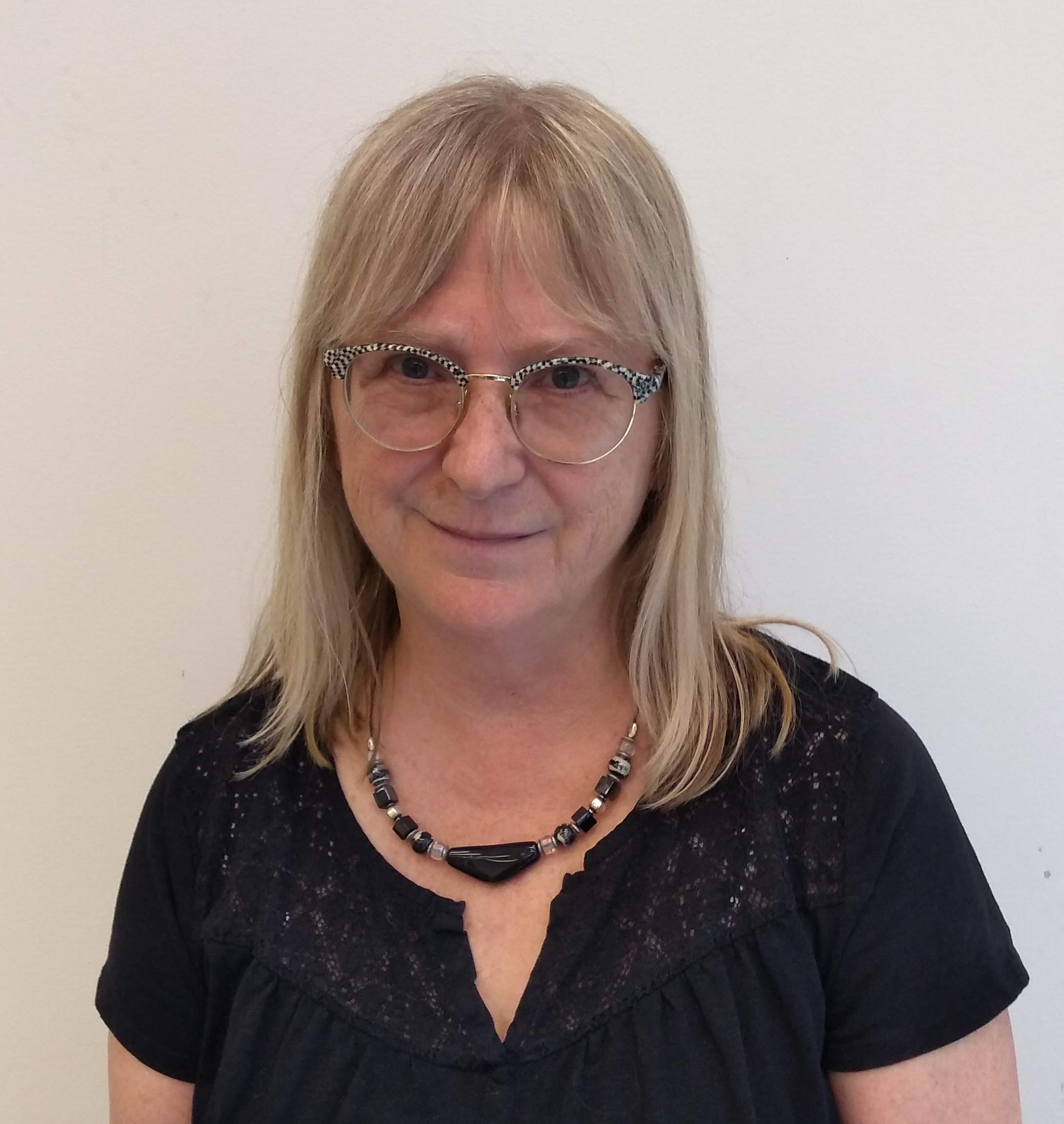
- Sanderson in 2019
- Born: 1952 (age 73–74)
- Education: Paier College of Art
- Occupations: Writer & illustrator
- Website: www.ruthsanderson.com

Ruth Sanderson (born 1951) is an American illustrator and writer of children's books.

== Biography ==
Sanderson graduated from the Paier College of Art in Connecticut in 1974. She is a member of the Society of Illustrators, the Society of Children's Book Writers and Illustrators, and the Western Massachusetts Illustrator's Guild.; and she is Co-Director of the low-residency MFA in Children's Book Writing and Illustrating and Certificate in Children's Book Illustration programs at Hollins University.

== Works ==
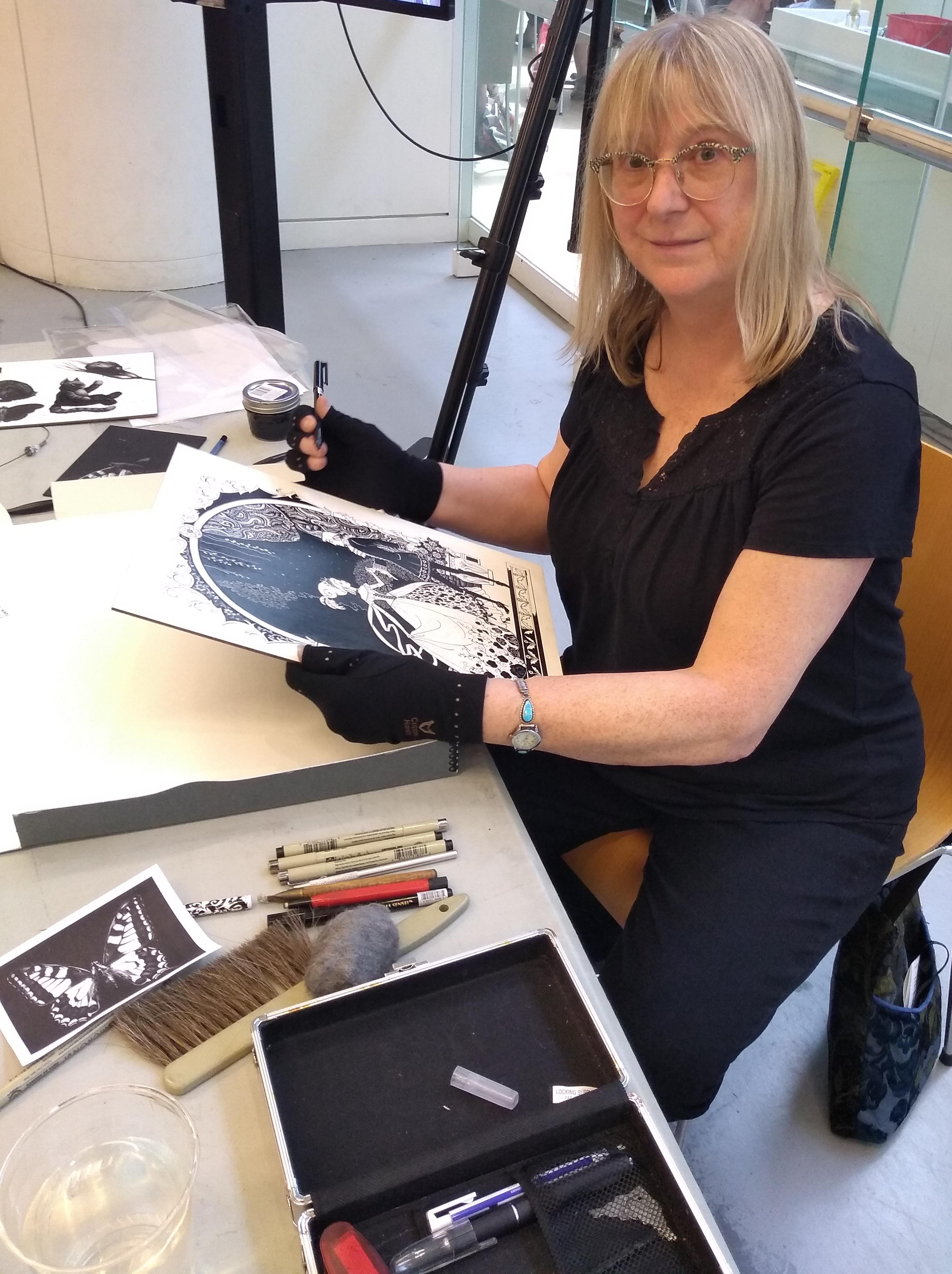
Sanderson demonstrating clayboard and scratchboard art at the Museum of Fine Arts, Boston in 2019.

Sanderson's earliest works were published in her mid-twenties: Grandma's Beach Surprise by Ilka List (G. P. Putnam's Sons) in 1975 and four including an edition of The Little Engine That Could in 1976. The latter was discussed at the time in terms of how the art reflected "the stereotypes of masculine strength and feminine weakness in vogue when it was written". She illustrated new editions of several young-adult novels in the Nancy Drew and Bobbsey Twins mystery series.

Library of Congress (LC) Catalog credits Sanderson as a writer primarily for retelling fairy tales, along with some stories from the Bible or about Christmas or about saints. In the catalog her earliest works as a writer are two published in 1990, a retelling of "The Twelve Dancing Princesses" and an original fairy tale, The Enchanted Wood (Little, Brown, LCCN 90-45096).

Sanderson's illustrations have been described as evocative of the past but employing a "21st century approach to texture and brightness."
