= List of Hardy Boys books =

Juvenile detective fiction

This is a list of all Hardy Boys books published, by series.

== The Hardy Boys Mystery Stories (1927–2005) ==
=== Grosset & Dunlap ===
Titles, authorship, and publication dates
№	Title	Pub.	Outline	Manuscript	Editor	Rev.	New outline	Revised by
1	The Tower Treasure	1927	Edward Stratemeyer (Note: Although it cannot be confirmed, Stratemeyer is the most accepted choice.)	Leslie McFarlane	Edward Stratemeyer	1959	Harriet Stratemeyer Adams	Harriet Stratemeyer Adams
2	The House on the Cliff	1927	Edward Stratemeyer	Leslie McFarlane	Edward Stratemeyer	1959	Harriet Stratemeyer Adams	Harriet Stratemeyer Adams
3	The Secret of the Old Mill	1927	Edward Stratemeyer	Leslie McFarlane	Edward Stratemeyer	1962	Harriet Stratemeyer Adams	Alistair Hunter
4	The Missing Chums	1928	Edward Stratemeyer	Leslie McFarlane	Edward Stratemeyer	1962	Harriet Stratemeyer Adams	James Buechler
5	Hunting for Hidden Gold	1928	Edward Stratemeyer	Leslie McFarlane	Edward Stratemeyer	1963	Harriet Stratemeyer Adams	Alistair Hunter
6	The Shore Road Mystery	1928	Edward Stratemeyer	Leslie McFarlane	Edward Stratemeyer	1964	David Grambs	David Grambs
7	The Secret of the Caves	1929	Edward Stratemeyer	Leslie McFarlane	Edward Stratemeyer	1965	Andrew E. Svenson	Andrew E. Svenson
8	The Mystery of Cabin Island	1929	Edward Stratemeyer	Leslie McFarlane	Edward Stratemeyer	1966	Anne Shultes	Anne Shultes, Andrew E. Svenson, and Harriet Stratemeyer Adams
9	The Great Airport Mystery	1930	Edward Stratemeyer	Leslie McFarlane	Edward Stratemeyer	1965	James Duncan Lawrence and Harriet Stratemeyer Adams	Tom Mulvey
10	What Happened at Midnight	1931	Edna Stratemeyer Squier	Leslie McFarlane	Harriet Stratemeyer Adams	1967	Tom Mulvey	Tom Mulvey
11	While the Clock Ticked	1932	Edna Stratemeyer Squier	Leslie McFarlane	Harriet Stratemeyer Adams	1962	Harriet Stratemeyer Adams, Grace Grote, and Andrew E. Svenson	James Buechler
12	Footprints Under the Window	1933	Edna Stratemeyer Squier	Leslie McFarlane (Note: McFarlane's credit is disputed, due to a number of differences between writing style from his other books, and more frequent and obvious racism that the series was criticized for in later years.)	Harriet Stratemeyer Adams	1965	David Grambs	David Grambs
13	The Mark on the Door	1934	Harriet Stratemeyer Adams	Leslie McFarlane	Harriet Stratemeyer Adams	1967	Tom Mulvey	Tom Mulvey
14	The Hidden Harbor Mystery	1935	Edna Stratemeyer Squier	Leslie McFarlane	Harriet Stratemeyer Adams	1961	Grace Grote	James Buechler
15	The Sinister Signpost	1936	Harriet Stratemeyer Adams	Leslie McFarlane	Harriet Stratemeyer Adams	1968	Tom Mulvey	Tom Mulvey
16	A Figure in Hiding	1937	Edna Stratemeyer Squier	Leslie McFarlane	Harriet Stratemeyer Adams	1965	James Duncan Lawrence	James Duncan Lawrence
17	The Secret Warning	1938	Edna Stratemeyer Squier	Leslie McFarlane and John Button (Note: McFarlane's credit is disputed, due to a number of differences between writing style from his other books, even though he claims authorship of The Secret Warning in his autobiography Ghost of the Hardy Boys. However, John Button's sole authorship of the entire manuscript is also in dispute, despite signed author records showing that he apparently wrote a manuscript for the book, due to a number of differences in writing style from his other books. There has been some speculation that the book, as it was released, was edited together by an editor at the Stratemeyer Syndicate from two different manuscripts that both McFarlane and Button wrote separately.)	Harriet Stratemeyer Adams	1966	James Duncan Lawrence	James Duncan Lawrence
18	The Twisted Claw	1939	Harriet Stratemeyer Adams	John Button	Harriet Stratemeyer Adams	1969	Tom Mulvey	Tom Mulvey
19	The Disappearing Floor	1940	Edna Stratemeyer Squier	John Button	Harriet Stratemeyer Adams	1964	James Duncan Lawrence	James Duncan Lawrence
20	The Mystery of the Flying Express	1941	Harriet Stratemeyer Adams	John Button	Harriet Stratemeyer Adams	1970	Andrew E. Svenson	Vincent Buranelli
21	The Clue of the Broken Blade	1942	Edna Stratemeyer Squier	John Button	Harriet Stratemeyer Adams	1970	Andrew E. Svenson	Richard Deming
22	The Flickering Torch Mystery	1943	Harriet Stratemeyer Adams	Leslie McFarlane	Harriet Stratemeyer Adams	1971	Andrew E. Svenson	Vincent Buranelli
23	The Melted Coins	1944	Harriet Stratemeyer Adams	Leslie McFarlane	Harriet Stratemeyer Adams	1970	Andrew E. Svenson	Andrew E. Svenson
24	The Short-Wave Mystery	1945	Harriet Stratemeyer Adams	Leslie McFarlane	Harriet Stratemeyer Adams	1966	Patricia Doll, Priscilla Baker-Carr, and James Duncan Lawrence	David Grambs
25	The Secret Panel	1946	Harriet Stratemeyer Adams	Harriet Stratemeyer Adams	Harriet Stratemeyer Adams	1969	Harriet Stratemeyer Adams	Priscilla Baker-Carr
26	The Phantom Freighter	1947	Harriet Stratemeyer Adams	Amy McFarlane	Harriet Stratemeyer Adams	1970	Harriet Stratemeyer Adams	Priscilla Baker-Carr
27	The Secret of Skull Mountain	1948	Harriet Stratemeyer Adams	George Waller, Jr. and Harriet Stratemeyer Adams	Harriet Stratemeyer Adams	1966	Harriet Stratemeyer Adams	David Grambs
28	The Sign of the Crooked Arrow	1949	Harriet Stratemeyer Adams	Andrew E. Svenson	Harriet Stratemeyer Adams	1970	Harriet Stratemeyer Adams	Priscilla Baker-Carr
29	The Secret of the Lost Tunnel	1950	Harriet Stratemeyer Adams	Andrew E. Svenson	Harriet Stratemeyer Adams	1968	Harriet Stratemeyer Adams	David Grambs, June Dunn, and Priscilla Baker-Carr
30	The Wailing Siren Mystery	1951	Harriet Stratemeyer Adams	Andrew E. Svenson and Harriet Stratemeyer Adams	Harriet Stratemeyer Adams	1968	Harriet Stratemeyer Adams	Priscilla Baker-Carr
31	The Secret of Wildcat Swamp	1952	Harriet Stratemeyer Adams	William Halstead and William Dougherty	Harriet Stratemeyer Adams	1969	Harriet Stratemeyer Adams	Priscilla Baker-Carr
32	The Crisscross Shadow	1953	Andrew E. Svenson	Richard Cohen	Harriet Stratemeyer Adams	1969	Andrew E. Svenson	Priscilla Baker-Carr
33	The Yellow Feather Mystery	1953	Andrew E. Svenson	William Dougherty	Harriet Stratemeyer Adams	1971	Andrew E. Svenson	Priscilla Baker-Carr
34	The Hooded Hawk Mystery	1954	Harriet Stratemeyer Adams	Charles S. Strong	Harriet Stratemeyer Adams	1971	Harriet Stratemeyer Adams	Priscilla Baker-Carr
35	The Clue in the Embers	1956	Harriet Stratemeyer Adams	John Almquist	Harriet Stratemeyer Adams	1972	Harriet Stratemeyer Adams	Priscilla Baker-Carr
36	The Secret of Pirates' Hill	1956	Andrew E. Svenson	John Almquist	Harriet Stratemeyer Adams	1972	Andrew E. Svenson	Priscilla Baker-Carr
37	The Ghost at Skeleton Rock	1957	Andrew E. Svenson	James Duncan Lawrence	Harriet Stratemeyer Adams	1966	Andrew E. Svenson	Priscilla Baker-Carr
38	The Mystery at Devil's Paw	1959	Andrew E. Svenson and Harriet Stratemeyer Adams	James Duncan Lawrence	Harriet Stratemeyer Adams	1973	Andrew E. Svenson and Harriet Stratemeyer Adams	Priscilla Baker-Carr
39	The Mystery of the Chinese Junk	1960	Andrew E. Svenson	James Duncan Lawrence	Harriet Stratemeyer Adams			
40	Mystery of the Desert Giant	1961	Andrew E. Svenson and Harriet Stratemeyer Adams	James Buechler	Harriet Stratemeyer Adams			
41	The Clue of the Screeching Owl	1962	Harriet Stratemeyer Adams and Grace Grote	James Buechler	Harriet Stratemeyer Adams			
42	The Viking Symbol Mystery	1963	Andrew E. Svenson	Alistair Hunter	Harriet Stratemeyer Adams			
43	The Mystery of the Aztec Warrior	1964	Harriet Stratemeyer Adams	Harriet Stratemeyer Adams	Harriet Stratemeyer Adams			
44	The Haunted Fort	1965	David Grambs	David Grambs	Andrew E. Svenson, Harriet Stratemeyer Adams, and Jocelyn Starzyk			
45	The Mystery of the Spiral Bridge	1966	Andrew E. Svenson	Andrew E. Svenson	Jocelyn Starzyk			
46	The Secret Agent on Flight 101	1967	Tom Mulvey	Tom Mulvey, Harriet Stratemeyer Adams, and Grace Grote	Andrew E. Svenson and Jocelyn Starzyk			
47	Mystery of the Whale Tattoo	1968	Andrew E. Svenson	Jerrold Mundis	Andrew E. Svenson and Lilo Wuenn			
48	The Arctic Patrol Mystery	1969	Andrew E. Svenson	Andrew E. Svenson	Lilo Wuenn			
49	The Bombay Boomerang	1970	Andrew E. Svenson	Vincent Buranelli	Lilo Wuenn			
50	Danger on Vampire Trail	1971	Andrew E. Svenson	Andrew E. Svenson	Lilo Wuenn			
51	The Masked Monkey	1972	Andrew E. Svenson	Vincent Buranelli	Lilo Wuenn			
52	The Shattered Helmet	1973	Andrew E. Svenson	Andrew E. Svenson	Lilo Wuenn			
53	The Clue of the Hissing Serpent	1974	Andrew E. Svenson	Andrew E. Svenson	Lilo Wuenn			
54	The Mysterious Caravan	1975	Andrew E. Svenson	Andrew E. Svenson	Lilo Wuenn			
55	The Witchmaster's Key	1976	Andrew E. Svenson and Vincent Buranelli	Vincent Buranelli	Lilo Wuenn			
56	The Jungle Pyramid	1977	Vincent Buranelli	Vincent Buranelli	Lilo Wuenn			
57	The Firebird Rocket	1978	Vincent Buranelli	Vincent Buranelli	Lilo Wuenn			
58	The Sting of the Scorpion	1979	James Duncan Lawrence	James Duncan Lawrence	Lilo Wuenn			

=== Simon & Schuster ===
In 1979, the Hardy Boys books began to be published by Wanderer Books Simon & Schuster in paperback format. Though formatted differently from the original 58-volume series which continued under Grosset & Dunlap's control, these new books were published under the Hardy Boys Mystery Stories banner. These books feature increasingly contemporary cover illustrations and some books have multiple versions of the cover art.

To collectors of Hardy Boys and Nancy Drew books, books in the original series published at Simon & Schuster are called "Digests". This is due to the books resembling Digest-size paperbacks, differing from Grosset & Dunlap's hardcover books (one of the reasons Adams switched to Simon & Schuster was that Grosset & Dunlap did not like this move, while Simon & Schuster agreed to it).

In 2005, the first eight volumes from Wanderer (#59-66) were republished by Grosset & Dunlap, alongside the first eight Nancy Drew volumes from Wanderer. These republications went out of print in 2013.

==== Wanderer editions ====
The main plot, formula, and continuity of the books remained similar to the original Grosset & Dunlap books still being published at the time. After Harriet Adams died in 1982, the Syndicate continued with five of its partners (Adams' remaining three children, plus authors Nancy Axelrod and Lilo Wuenn), until its sale to Simon & Schuster in 1987.

Night of the Werewolf was originally listed as the next book at the end of Sting of the Scorpion. Grosset & Dunlap continued to list this until they lost a court case against the Syndicate and Simon & Schuster in May 1980. The book was later revised to eliminate the next title and instead referenced the first book in the series, The Tower Treasure. They later published Night of the Werewolf and the next seven titles in 2005, with the permission and collaboration of Simon & Schuster. These last eight titles were discontinued once the license ran out.

Titles, authorship, and publication dates
№	Title	Pub.	Outline	Manuscript	Editor	
59	Night of the Werewolf	1979	James Duncan Lawrence	James Duncan Lawrence	Lilo Wuenn	
60	Mystery of the Samurai Sword	1979	James Duncan Lawrence	James Duncan Lawrence	Lilo Wuenn	
61	The Pentagon Spy	1980	Vincent Buranelli	Vincent Buranelli	Lilo Wuenn	
62	The Apeman's Secret	1980	James Duncan Lawrence	James Duncan Lawrence	Lilo Wuenn	
63	The Mummy Case	1980	Vincent Buranelli	Vincent Buranelli	Lilo Wuenn	
64	Mystery of Smugglers Cove	1980	Vincent Buranelli	Vincent Buranelli	Lilo Wuenn	
65	The Stone Idol	1981	Vincent Buranelli	Vincent Buranelli	Lilo Wuenn	
66	The Vanishing Thieves	1981	1981	Richard Deming	Lilo Wuenn	Richard Deming
67	The Outlaw's Silver	1981	James Duncan Lawrence	James Duncan Lawrence	Lilo Wuenn	
68	The Submarine Caper (Note: Retitled Deadly Chase in 1987.)	1981	Conrad Fuchs (Note: Fuchs wrote his manuscript in German; Lilo Wuenn translated.)	Conrad Fuchs	Lilo Wuenn	
69	The Four-Headed Dragon	1981	Laurence Swinburne	Laurence Swinburne	Lilo Wuenn	
70	The Infinity Clue	1981	Karl Harr III (Note: Harr was the grandson of Harriett Stratemeyer Adams, and great-grandson of Edward Stratemeyer.)	Karl Harr III	Lilo Wuenn	
71	Track of the Zombie	1982	Vincent Buranelli	Vincent Buranelli	Lilo Wuenn	
72	The Voodoo Plot	1982	Karl Harr III	Karl Harr III	Lilo Wuenn	
73	The Billion Dollar Ransom	1982	Laurence Swinburne	Laurence Swinburne	Lilo Wuenn	
74	Tic-Tac-Terror	1982	James Duncan Lawrence	James Duncan Lawrence	Lilo Wuenn	
75	Trapped at Sea	1982	Vincent Buranelli	Vincent Buranelli	Lilo Wuenn	
76	Game Plan for Disaster	1982	Laurence Swinburne	Laurence Swinburne	Lilo Wuenn	
77	The Crimson Flame	1983	Vincent Buranelli	Vincent Buranelli	Lilo Wuenn	
78	Cave-In	1983	Karl Harr III	Karl Harr III	Lilo Wuenn	
79	Sky Sabotage	1983			Lilo Wuenn	
80	The Roaring River Mystery	1984	Karl Harr III	Karl Harr III	Lilo Wuenn	
81	The Demon's Den	1984			Lilo Wuenn	
82	The Blackwing Puzzle	1984			Lilo Wuenn	
83	The Swamp Monster	1985	Neal Barrett Jr.	Neal Barrett Jr.	Lilo Wuenn	
84	Revenge of the Desert Phantom	1985			Lilo Wuenn	
85	The Skyfire Puzzle (Note: Oiriginally titled and advertised as Mystery of the Space Shuttle.)	1985	Neal Barrett Jr.	Neal Barrett Jr.	Lilo Wuenn	

==== Minstrel editions ====
After volume 85, the series took a two-and-a-half-year hiatus due to the sale of the Stratemeyer Syndicate to Simon & Schuster. At this point, book packager Mega-Books took over the series, and hired different ghostwriters for the job (many of whom are still unknown). Mega-Books worked on the series until #153 Eye On Crime in 1998. Starting with #154 The Caribbean Cruise Caper, Simon & Schuster handled all books internally. The ghostwriters who are known are ones who have either been discovered through other resources, or have publicly revealed themselves as a ghostwriter for the series.

Titles, authorship, and publication dates
№	Title	Pub.	Outline	Manuscript	Editor
86	The Mystery of the Silver Star	1987			Anne Greenberg
87	Program for Destruction	1987			Anne Greenberg
88	Tricky Business	1988			Anne Greenberg
89	The Sky Blue Frame	1988			Anne Greenberg
90	Danger on the Diamond	1988			Anne Greenberg
91	Shield of Fear	1988			Anne Greenberg
92	The Shadow Killers	1988			Anne Greenberg
93	The Serpent's Tooth Mystery	1988			Anne Greenberg
94	Breakdown in Axeblade	1989			Anne Greenberg
95	Danger On The Air	1989	Christopher Lampton	Christopher Lampton	Anne Greenberg
96	Wipeout	1989			Anne Greenberg
97	Cast of Criminals	1989			Anne Greenberg
98	Spark of Suspicion	1989			Anne Greenberg
99	Dungeon of Doom	1989	Christopher Lampton	Christopher Lampton	Anne Greenberg
100	The Secret of the Island Treasure	1990	Christopher Lampton	Christopher Lampton	Anne Greenberg
101	The Money Hunt	1990			Anne Greenberg
102	Terminal Shock	1990	Christopher Lampton	Christopher Lampton	Anne Greenberg
103	The Million-Dollar Nightmare	1990			Anne Greenberg
104	Tricks of the Trade	1990			Anne Greenberg
105	The Smoke Screen Mystery	1990			Anne Greenberg
106	Attack of the Video Villains	1991	Christopher Lampton	Christopher Lampton	Anne Greenberg
107	Panic on Gull Island	1991			Anne Greenberg
108	Fear on Wheels	1991			Anne Greenberg
109	The Prime-Time Crime	1991	Christopher Lampton	Christopher Lampton	Anne Greenberg
110	The Secret of Sigma Seven	1991	Christopher Lampton	Christopher Lampton	Anne Greenberg
111	Three-Ring Terror	1991			Anne Greenberg
112	The Demolition Mission	1992			Anne Greenberg
113	Radical Moves	1992			Anne Greenberg
114	The Case of the Counterfeit Criminals	1992			Anne Greenberg
115	Sabotage at Sports City	1992			Anne Greenberg
116	Rock 'n' Roll Renegades	1992	Christopher Lampton	Christopher Lampton	Anne Greenberg
117	The Baseball Card Conspiracy	1992			Anne Greenberg
118	Danger in the Fourth Dimension	1993			Anne Greenberg
119	Trouble at Coyote Canyon	1993			Anne Greenberg
120	The Case of the Cosmic Kidnapping	1993	Christopher Lampton	Christopher Lampton	Anne Greenberg
121	The Mystery in the Old Mine	1993			Anne Greenberg
122	Carnival of Crime	1993			Anne Greenberg
123	The Robot's Revenge	1993			Anne Greenberg
124	Mystery with a Dangerous Beat	1994	Frances Lantz	Frances Lantz	Anne Greenberg
125	Mystery on Makatunk Island	1994			Anne Greenberg
126	Racing to Disaster	1994			Anne Greenberg
127	Reel Thrills	1994			Anne Greenberg
128	Day of the Dinosaur	1994			Anne Greenberg
129	The Treasure at Dolphin Bay	1994			Anne Greenberg
130	Sidetracked to Danger	1995			Anne Greenberg
131	Crusade of the Flaming Sword	1995			Anne Greenberg
132	Maximum Challenge	1995			Anne Greenberg
133	Crime in the Kennel	1995			Anne Greenberg
134	Cross-Country Crime	1995			Anne Greenberg
135	The Hypersonic Secret	1995			Anne Greenberg
136	The Cold Cash Caper	1996			Anne Greenberg
137	High-Speed Showdown	1996			Anne Greenberg
138	The Alaskan Adventure	1996			Anne Greenberg
139	The Search for the Snow Leopard	1996			Anne Greenberg
140	Slam Dunk Sabotage	1996			Anne Greenberg
141	The Desert Thieves	1996			Anne Greenberg
142	Lost in Gator Swamp	1997			Anne Greenberg
143	The Giant Rat of Sumatra	1997			Anne Greenberg
144	The Secret of Skeleton Reef	1997			Anne Greenberg
145	Terror at High Tide	1997			Anne Greenberg
146	The Mark of the Blue Tattoo	1997			Anne Greenberg
147	Trial and Terror	1997			Anne Greenberg
148	The Ice-Cold Case	1998			Anne Greenberg
149	The Chase for the Mystery Twister	1998			Anne Greenberg
150	The Crisscross Crime (Note: Originally written for the Casefiles series.)	1998			Anne Greenberg
151	The Rocky Road to Revenge	1998			Anne Greenberg
152	Danger in the Extreme	1998			Anne Greenberg
153	Eye on Crime	1998			Anne Greenberg
154	The Caribbean Cruise Caper	1999			Anne Greenberg
155	The Hunt for the Four Brothers	1999			Anne Greenberg
156	A Will to Survive	1999			Anne Greenberg
157	The Lure of the Italian Treasure	1999			Anne Greenberg
158	The London Deception	1999			Anne Greenberg
159	Daredevils	1999			Anne Greenberg
160	A Game Called Chaos	2000	Stephen D. Sullivan	Stephen D. Sullivan	Anne Greenberg
161	Training for Trouble	2000			Anne Greenberg
162	The End of the Trail	2000	Christopher Lampton	Christopher Lampton	Anne Greenberg
163	The Spy that Never Lies	2000	Stephen D. Sullivan	Stephen D. Sullivan	Anne Greenberg
164	Skin & Bones	2000			Anne Greenberg
165	Crime in the Cards	2001	Stephen D. Sullivan	Stephen D. Sullivan	Anne Greenberg
166	Past And Present Danger	2001			Anne Greenberg
167	Trouble Times Two	2001			Anne Greenberg
168	The Castle Conundrum	2001			Anne Greenberg
169	Ghost of a Chance	2001			Anne Greenberg
170	Kickoff to Danger	2001			Anne Greenberg

=== Aladdin editions ===
With the new millennium, the series changed publishers to the Aladdin subdivision of Simon & Schuster. With the reboot of Nancy Drew into Girl Detective, coupled with declining sales, Simon & Schuster ended the original series in April 2005.

Titles, authorship, and publication dates
№	Title	Pub.	Outline	Manuscript	Editor
171	The Test Case	2002			Anne Greenberg
172	Trouble in Warp Space	2002	Stephen D. Sullivan	Stephen D. Sullivan	Anne Greenberg
173	Speed Times Five	2002	Stephen D. Sullivan	Stephen D. Sullivan	Anne Greenberg
174	Hide-and-Sneak	2002			Anne Greenberg
175	Trick-or-Trouble	2002	Stephen D. Sullivan	Stephen D. Sullivan	Anne Greenberg
176	In Plane Sight	2002	Stephen D. Sullivan	Stephen D. Sullivan	Anne Greenberg
177	The Case of the Psychic's Vision	2003	George Edward Stanley	George Edward Stanley	
178	The Mystery of the Black Rhino	2003	George Edward Stanley	George Edward Stanley	
179	Passport to Danger	2003			
180	Typhoon Island	2003	Stephen D. Sullivan	Stephen D. Sullivan	
181	Double Jeopardy	2003			
182	The Secret of the Soldier's Gold	2003	George Edward Stanley	George Edward Stanley	
183	Warehouse Rumble	2004	Stephen D. Sullivan	Stephen D. Sullivan	
184	The Dangerous Transmission	2004			
185	Wreck and Roll	2004	Stephen D. Sullivan	Stephen D. Sullivan	
186	Hidden Mountain	2004	George Edward Stanley	George Edward Stanley	
187	No Way Out	2004			
188	Farming Fear	2004	Stephen D. Sullivan	Stephen D. Sullivan	
189	One False Step	2005	George Edward Stanley	George Edward Stanley	
190	Motocross Madness	2005	Stephen D. Sullivan	Stephen D. Sullivan	

=== Nancy Drew and the Hardy Boys: Be a Detective Mystery Stories (1984–1985) ===
In these books the reader controls the outcome of the story by choosing different options of advancing the plot, similar to the Choose Your Own Adventure books.

1. The Secret of the Knight’s Sword
2. Danger on Ice
3. The Feathered Serpent
4. Secret Cargo
5. The Alaskan Mystery
6. The Missing Money Mystery

== The Hardy Boys Casefiles Series (1987–1998) ==
The Hardy Boys Casefiles are aimed at early-to-mid teen readers and have more mature themes, including espionage, murder, and slight romance. The new direction the series would take was set in the first volume, Dead On Target, as a bomb planted in the Hardy Boys' car blows up Joe's longtime girlfriend, Iola Morton, in the first chapter. Book packager Mega-Books and Simon & Schuster released the first two Casefiles under the Archway imprint in April 1987 and continued to release a new title monthly until November 1997. In January 1998 the last Casefile, #127 Dead in the Water, was released. This series was published in mass-market, or rack-sized, paperbacks to widen the distribution of the books to supermarkets and other outlets. In September 1987 the Hardy Boys Digest series was revived and continued with #86 The Mystery of the Silver Star. Events from the Casefiles are not referenced in the Digest series, and Iola Morton is alive and connected with Joe Hardy as in the previous 85 titles. The Casefiles universe also merges with the Nancy Drew Files and Tom Swift worlds in titles published as A Nancy Drew and Hardy Boys SuperMystery and A Hardy Boys and Tom Swift UltraThriller. Several spin-off series were cancelled by Simon & Schuster at the end of 1997, including The Hardy Boys Casefiles.

Titles, authorship, and publication dates
#	Title	Pub.	Manuscript
1	Dead on Target	April 1987	Bill McKay
2	Evil, Inc.	April 1987	
3	Cult of Crime	May 1987	Steven Grant
4	The Lazarus Plot	June 1987	
5	Edge of Destruction	July 1987	
6	The Crowning Terror	August 1987	Steven Grant
7	Deathgame	September 1987	
8	See No Evil	October 1987	
9	The Genius Thieves	November 1987	Peter Lerangis
10	Hostages of Hate	December 1987	
11	Brother Against Brother	January 1988	
12	Perfect Getaway	February 1988	
13	The Borgia Dagger	March 1988	Peter Lerangis
14	Too Many Traitors	April 1988	Steven Grant
15	Blood Relations	May 1988	
16	Line of Fire	June 1988	
17	The Number File	July 1988	Bruce Whitehill
18	A Killing in the Market	August 1988	Peter Lerangis
19	Nightmare in Angel City	September 1988	Steven Grant
20	Witness to Murder	October 1988	Barbara Steiner
21	Street Spies	November 1988	Susan Wittig Albert & Bill Albert
22	Double Exposure	December 1988	Dave Stern (D.A. Stern)
23	Disaster for Hire	January 1989	Ron Goulart
24	Scene of the Crime	February 1989	
25	The Borderline Case	March 1989	
26	Trouble in the Pipeline	April 1989	
27	Nowhere to Run	May 1989	Larry Mike Garmon
28	Countdown to Terror	June 1989	
29	Thick as Thieves	July 1989	Steven Grant
30	The Deadliest Dare	August 1989	Ron Goulart
31	Without a Trace	September 1989	Susan Wittig Albert & Bill Albert
32	Blood Money	October 1989	Dave Stern (D.A. Stern)
33	Collision Course	November 1989	Rick Oliver
34	Final Cut	December 1989	
35	The Dead Season	January 1990	
36	Running on Empty	February 1990	Larry Mike Garmon
37	Danger Zone	March 1990	Peter Lerganis
38	Diplomatic Deceit	April 1990	
39	Flesh and Blood	May 1990	Larry Mike Garmon
40	Fright Wave	June 1990	Rick Oliver
41	Highway Robbery	July 1990	
42	The Last Laugh	August 1990	
43	Strategic Moves	September 1990	Larry Mike Garmon
44	Castle Fear	October 1990	Ron Goulart
45	In Self-Defense	November 1990	Rick Oliver
46	Foul Play	December 1990	Larry Mike Garmon
47	Flight Into Danger	January 1991	Gary Cohn
48	Rock ‘N’ Revenge	February 1991	
49	Dirty Deeds	March 1991	
50	Power Play	April 1991	Rick Oliver
51	Choke Hold	May 1991	
52	Uncivil War	June 1991	
53	Web of Horror	July 1991	
54	Deep Trouble	August 1991	
55	Beyond the Law	September 1991	
56	Height of Danger	October 1991	
57	Terror on Track	November 1991	David Robbins
58	Spiked!	December 1991	
59	Open Season	January 1992	Rick Oliver
60	Deadfall	February 1992	
61	Grave Danger	March 1992	
62	Final Gambit	April 1992	Steven Grant
63	Cold Sweat	May 1992	
64	Endangered Species (Note: Part of the "Operation Phoenix" Trilogy.)	June 1992	
65	No Mercy	July 1992	Chris Lampton
66	The Phoenix Equation	August 1992	
67	Lethal Cargo	September 1992	
68	Rough Riding	October 1992	
69	Mayhem in Motion	November 1992	Rick Oliver
70	Rigged for Revenge	December 1992	
71	Real Horror	January 1993	
72	Screamers	February 1993	
73	Bad Rap	March 1993	
74	Road Pirates	April 1993	
75	No Way Out	May 1993	
76	Tagged for Terror (Note: Part of the "Ring of Evil" Trilogy.)	June 1993	Rick Oliver
77	Survival Run	July 1993	
78	The Pacific Conspiracy	August 1993	
79	Danger Unlimited	September 1993	Frances Lantz
80	Dead of Night	October 1993	
81	Sheer Terror	November 1993	
82	Poisoned Paradise	December 1993	
83	Toxic Revenge	January 1994	
84	False Alarm	February 1994	
85	Winner Take All	March 1994	Rick Oliver
86	Virtual Villainy	April 1994	
87	Dead Man in Deadwood	May 1994	
88	Inferno Of Fear	June 1994	Rick Oliver
89	Darkness Falls	July 1994	
90	Deadly Engagement	August 1994	
91	Hot Wheels	September 1994	
92	Sabotage at Sea	October 1994	Gary Cohn
93	Mission: Mayhem	November 1994	Rick Oliver
94	A Taste for Terror	December 1994	
95	Illegal Procedure	January 1995	Joe Holley
96	Against All Odds	February 1995	
97	Pure Evil	March 1995	
98	Murder By Magic	April 1995	Rick Oliver
99	Frame-Up	May 1995	
100	True Thriller	June 1995	Rick Oliver
101	Peak of Danger	July 1995	
102	Wrong Side of the Law	August 1995	
103	Campaign of Crime	September 1995	
104	Wild Wheels	October 1995	Gary Cohn
105	Law of the Jungle	November 1995	
106	Shock Jock	December 1995	
107	Fast Break	January 1996	
108	Blown Away	February 1996	
109	Moment of Truth	March 1996	Joe Holley
110	Bad Chemistry	April 1996	
111	Competitive Edge	May 1996	
112	Cliff-Hanger	June 1996	
113	Sky High	July 1996	
114	Clean Sweep	August 1996	
115	Cave Trap	September 1996	
116	Acting Up	October 1996	
117	Blood Sport	November 1996	
118	The Last Leap	December 1996	
119	The Emperor’s Shield	January 1997	
120	Survival of the Fittest	February 1997	
121	Absolute Zero	March 1997	
122	River Rats	April 1997	
123	High Wire Act	May 1997	
124	The Viking’s Revenge	July 1997	Stephen D. Sullivan
125	Stress Point	September 1997	
126	Fire in the Sky	November 1997	Larry Mike Garmon
127	Dead in the Water	January 1998	

In addition, there were three unpublished titles, only two of them known: Book #128, titled Explosive Force, was written by Jerry Novick, and a complete manuscript exists; Book #130, titled The Crisscross Crime, was rewritten for the original series, and released as #150.

=== Nancy Drew and Hardy Boys Super Mystery Series (1988–1998) ===
The Hardy Boys and Nancy Drew teamed up in this 36-volume series of paperbacks. This series follows the formula of the main characters and their friends typically involved in separate mysteries that end up being connected. The sleuths join forces to solve the overall mystery. This series is based in the Nancy Drew Files and Hardy Boys Casefiles continuity, so murder, romance, and flirtation between the series regulars are common. Nancy Drew and Frank Hardy share an attraction in this series, though after a brief kiss in The Last Resort this attraction is not acted on. Subsequent books focus on the respect and friendship that developed between the two and their continued feelings for Ned Nickerson and Callie Shaw. Several spin-off series were cancelled by Simon & Schuster at the end of 1997, including the Nancy Drew and Hardy Boys SuperMystery series. Starting in 2007, in order to differentiate between the new Super Mystery series, many fans started referring to this series as SuperMystery'88.

=== Hardy Boys and Tom Swift Ultra Thriller Series (1992–1993) ===
The two-volume Ultra-Thriller series is a short-lived Hardy Boys spin-off that joined boy inventor Tom Swift with the crime-solving Hardy Boys, Frank and Joe. Although the Franklin W. Dixon pseudonym was used, the series was more akin to the then-current Tom Swift IV series and listed in the Tom Swift books as part of that series. Published as mass-market paperback books under the Archway imprint of Simon & Schuster. Both books were written by Bill McKay.

1. Time Bomb
2. The Alien Factor

=== Collector's editions and foreign publications ===
From 1998 to 1999, Simon & Schuster published three Hardy Boys Casefiles Collector's Editions that contained three previously published Casefiles stories (Vol. 1 #'s 38, 39 and 40; Vol. 2 #'s 48, 51 and 52; Vol. 3 #'s 55, 58 and 59). In 2005, Simon & Schuster reprinted Vol. 3 in hardcover with a different cover that used the current Hardy Boys Mystery Stories (Digest) cover of a file folder with modified art from Hardy Boys #152, exclusively for Borders Bookstores.

The Canadian rights to the Casefiles and its spin-offs have been held by Paperjacks (April 1987-December 1989) and Distican, Inc./Simon & Schuster Canada (January 1990 – present; Simon & Schuster US bought out Distican in 2002 and just changed the company name). Aside from inserting an ad for their 'Books By Mail' program, their address on the copyright page, and a small Maple Leaf with "Printed In Canada" being put on the front covers, and distributing the books, Paperjacks was allowed no other editorial/layout changes to the books. Once Distican took over the rights in January 1990, the books were all published in the US and just distributed by Distican in Canada with no publishing occurring in Canada.

Simon & Schuster UK have published many 2-in-1 and 3-in-1 books of the Casefiles since the early 1990s in the UK and other British Commonwealth Nations (except Canada). In 2005/06 Simon & Schuster UK reissued four Casefiles under the Undercover Brothers label, with two other books being planned but cancelled before publication.

Armada/Collins held the UK/British Commonwealth (except Canada) rights to the Casefiles from about 1988 till 1991, with reprint rights continuing throughout the 1990s, allowing Armada to publish different 2-in-1 and 3-in-1 books of the first 10 Casefiles.

== The Clues Brothers (1997–2000) ==
The Clues Brothers books were aimed at younger readers, particularly in third and fourth grades. The series was introduced in 1997 and was cancelled in 2000 for lack of popularity. Starting in 2013 the series is available as ebooks.

This series had some big differences from the other Hardy Boys books, such as:

- The Hardy Boys do not solve major crimes as they do in the others.
- In these books, Joe and Frank are only 8 and 9, unlike the other books where they are 17 and 18.
- They go to Bayport Elementary School; in the others, they go to Bayport High School.
1. The Gross Ghost Mystery
2. The Karate Clue
3. First Day, Worst Day
4. Jump-Shot Detectives
5. The Dinosaur Disaster
6. Who Took the Book?
7. The Abracadabra Case
8. The Dog-Gone Detectives
9. The Pumped-Up Pizza Problem
10. The Walking Snowman
11. The Monster in the Lake
12. King for a Day
13. Pirates Ahoy!
14. All Eyes on First Prize
15. Slip, Slide, and Slap Shot
16. The Fish-Faced Mask Of Mystery
17. The Bike Race Ruckus

== The Hardy Boys: Undercover Brothers (2005–2012) ==
The Hardy Boys: Undercover Brothers is a series of paperback books which replaced the Digest paperbacks in early 2005.

The Hardy Boys are now agents of A.T.A.C. (American Teens Against Crime) and are solving more realistic and/or violent crimes.

This series is written in first-person narrative style with Frank and Joe alternating chapters.

2005
1. Extreme Danger
2. Running On Fumes
3. Boardwalk Bust
4. Thrill Ride
5. Rocky Road
6. Burned
7. Operation: Survival

2006
8. Top Ten Ways to Die
9. Martial Law
10. Blown Away
11. Hurricane Joe
12. Trouble in Paradise
13. The Mummy's Curse

2007
14. Hazed
15. Death And Diamonds
16. Bayport Buccaneers
17. Murder At The Mall
18. Pushed
19. Foul Play

2008
20. Feeding Frenzy
21. Comic Con Artist
22. Deprivation House (Murder House trilogy)
23. House Arrest
24. Murder House
25. Double Trouble (Double Trouble trilogy)

2009
26. Double Down
27. Double Deception
28. Galaxy X (Galaxy X trilogy)
29. X-plosion [Galaxy X trilogy]
30. The X-Factor [Galaxy X trilogy]
31. Killer Mission (Killer Mystery trilogy)

2010
32. Private Killer
33. Killer Connections
34. The Children of the Lost (Lost Mystery trilogy)
35. Lost Brother

2011
36. Forever Lost
37. Movie Menace (Deathstalker Trilogy)
38. Movie Mission

2012
39. Movie Mayhem - last book in series; Hardy Boys UB canceled January 2012
40. The Case of the MyFace Kidnapper (working title) - series cancelled before publication

Spy Set - box set of volumes 1–4 (2005)

=== Super Mysteries ===
1. Wanted - 2006
2. Kidnapped at the Casino - 2007
3. Haunted (Special Ghost Story edition) - 2008

=== Nancy Drew and the Hardy Boys Super Mystery Series (2007–2012) ===
The Nancy Drew and the Hardy Boys Super Mystery books are a new series first published in June 2007 and are not to be confused with the Nancy Drew and Hardy Boys SuperMystery series that was published between 1988 and 1998. Many fans, in order to avoid confusion with the earlier series, refer to this series as the Super Mystery'07 series.

This is a spin-off series of the Nancy Drew: Girl Detective series and The Hardy Boys: Undercover Brothers series. Books are narrated in the first person with chapters alternating between Nancy's, Frank's, and Joe's view. Series was cancelled with Nancy Drew: Girl Detective and The Hardy Boys: Undercover Brothers in 2012.

1. Terror on Tour - 2007
2. Danger Overseas - 2008
3. Club Dread - 2009
4. Gold Medal Murder - 2010
5. Bonfire Masquerade - 2011
6. Stage Fright - 2012

=== The Hardy Boys: Undercover Brothers Graphic Novels (2005–2010) ===
The Hardy Boys: Undercover Brothers also appear in a series of graphic novels by Papercutz.

1. The Ocean of Osyria - 2005
2. Identity Theft
3. Mad House
4. Malled - 2006
5. Sea You, Sea Me
6. Hyde & Shriek
7. The Opposite Numbers
8. Board To Death - 2007
9. To Die Or Not To Die
10. A Hardy Day's Night
11. Abracadeath - 2008
12. Dude Ranch O' Death!
13. The Deadliest Stunt
14. Haley Danelle's Top Eight
15. Live Free, Die Hardy!
16. Shhhhhh! - 2009
17. Word Up!
18. D.A.N.G.E.R. Spells the Hangman
19. Chaos at 30,000 Feet!
20. Deadly Strategy - 2010

==== The Hardy Boys: Undercover Brothers – The New Case Files Graphic Novels (2010–2011) ====
(A new graphic novel series from Papercutz)

1. Crawling with Zombies - October 26, 2010
2. Break-Up! - March 15, 2011
3. Nancy Drew: Girl Detective - The New Case Files #3 / Together With The Hardy Boys – August 2, 2011 (this book is listed as number 3 in the second Nancy Drew graphic novel series, but it is also the 3rd story in the second Hardy Boys graphic novel series and concludes the plot that was begun in The Hardy Boys: Undercover Brothers – The New Case Files #1 and #2, and Nancy Drew: Girl Detective – The New Case Files #1 and #2)

== The Hardy Boys Adventures (2013–2023) ==
In 2011, Simon & Schuster canceled the Undercover Brothers series and launched a new series, Hardy Boys Adventures, publishing four volumes in 2013. The reboot series published two to three new titles a year in paperback, hardcover book with dust jacket, and as eBooks. This series is written in the first person, with chapters alternating between Frank's and Joe's narration. The first four titles initially printed 25,000 copies in paperback and 2,500 copies in hardcover. Books 5 through 8 had an initial print run of 25,000 in paperback and 5,000 in hardcover. Books 9 and 10 had an initial print run of 10,000 in paperback and 5,000 in hardcover. Audio books were released starting in 2015 on CD and download, read by Tim Gregory. The first three titles were published as a single volume in June 2016 using the cover art from the first book in the series.

=== Titles ===
Titles and publication dates
#	Title	Released	Manuscript
1	Secret of the Red Arrow	February 5, 2013	
2	Mystery of the Phantom Heist	February 5, 2013	
3	The Vanishing Game	June 4, 2013	
4	Into Thin Air	October 22, 2013	
5	Peril at Granite Peak	February 4, 2014	
6	The Battle of Bayport	June 3, 2014	Reuben Sack
7	Shadows at Predator Reef	October 21, 2014	Reuben Sack
8	Deception on the Set	February 3, 2015	Michael Anthony Steele
9	The Curse of the Ancient Emerald	June 9, 2015	Paul Crilley
10	Tunnel of Secrets	October 20, 2015	Reuben Sack
11	Showdown at Widow Creek	February 2, 2016	Michael Anthony Steele
12	The Madman of Black Bear Mountain	June 7, 2016	Reuben Sack
13	Bound for Danger	October 11, 2016	
14	Attack of the Bayport Beast	February 21, 2017	Michael Anthony Steele
15	A Con Artist in Paris	September 5, 2017	Reuben Sack
16	Stolen Identity	February 20, 2018	Michael Anthony Steele
17	The Gray Hunter's Revenge	October 9, 2018	
18	The Disappearance	February 19, 2019	
19	Dungeons & Detectives	October 22, 2019	Reuben Sack
20	Return to Black Bear Mountain	February 18, 2020	Reuben Sack
21	A Treacherous Tide	July 14, 2020	Reuben Sack
22	Trouble Island	February 16, 2021	
23	Mystery on the Mayhem Express	June 22, 2021	
24	As the Falcon Flies	January 4, 2022	
25	The Smuggler's Legacy	February 14, 2023	

=== Trivia ===
- The original title for Mystery of the Phantom Heist was Masked Mayhem, and listed as such for pre-order on several online sites before the name change.
- According to ghostwriter Michael Anthony Steele, his original title for #8 Deception on the Set was Stunt Doubles.
- The working title for Bound for Danger was Foul Play. This would have been the third use of this title in a Hardy Boys series.
- In June 2018, online retailers listed Hardy Boys Adventures #18 under the title The Vanishing Room, accompanied by a corresponding plot synopsis and cover art. However, beginning September 2018, several platforms updated their listings to reflect a new title, The Disappearance. While the cover art itself remained unchanged, it was revised to display the new title, and the plot description was significantly altered to reflect a different story.
- The Hardy Boys appear in the Nancy Drew Diaries title A Nancy Drew Christmas, which was released in September 2018.
- The Smuggler's Legacy was originally scheduled to be published in June 2022. It was pushed back to 2023, consistent with other Simon and Schuster titles scheduled to be published in the later part of 2022. Also impacted was Nancy Drew Diaries Captain Stone's Revenge.

== The Hardy Boys Secret Files (2010–2015) ==
The Hardy Boys Secret Files is a series begun in 2010 by the publisher Simon & Schuster under their Aladdin imprint. It features the Hardy Boys, Frank and Joe, as grade-school detectives. Three new titles are published yearly as paperback books and eBooks. This series rebooted in 2016 as the Hardy Boys Clue Book series.

1. Trouble at the Arcade
2. The Missing Mitt
3. Mystery Map
4. Hopping Mad
5. A Monster of a Mystery
6. The Bicycle Thief
7. The Disappearing Dog
8. Sports Sabotage
9. The Great Coaster Caper
10. A Rockin' Mystery (October 2012)
11. Robot Rumble (April 2013)
12. Lights, Camera...Zombies! (August 2013)
13. Balloon Blow-Up (December 2013)
14. Fossil Frenzy (April 2014)
15. Ship of Secrets (August 2014)
16. Camping Chaos (December 2014)
17. The Great Escape (April 2015)
18. Medieval Upheaval (August 2015)
19. The Race Is On (December 2015)

=== The Hardy Boys Clue Book (2016–2024) ===
This is a re-boot of the Hardy Boys Secret Files series published by Aladdin Paperbacks in paperback, hardcover, and eBook editions written by Franklin W. Dixon with covers and internal illustrations by Matt David. Illustrations and cover art for book #7 by Santy Gutierrez. This is an interactive series, as readers will get to write down their clues and predictions. A page before the final chapter has questions the reader can answer regarding suspects, clues, and solutions. The first book in the series references events in the last book of the Hardy Boys Secret Files series, making this a continuation of that series.

=== Titles ===
Titles and publication dates
#	Title	Released	Manuscript
1	The Video Game Bandit	April 19, 2016	
2	The Missing Playbook	April 19, 2016	
3	Water-Ski Wipeout	August 9, 2016	
4	Talent Show Tricks	December 6, 2016	
5	Scavenger Hunt Heist	April 4, 2017	
6	A Skateboard Cat-astrophe	November 14, 2017	
7	The Pirate Ghost	April 3, 2018	
8	The Time Warp Wonder	November 13, 2018	
9	Who Let the Frogs Out?	April 2, 2019	Judy Katschke
10	The Great Pumpkin Smash	September 3, 2019	
11	Bug-napped	April 14, 2020	
12	Sea Life Secrets	August 18, 2020	Reuben Sack
13	Robot Rescue!	April 20, 2021	
14	The Bad Luck Skate	August 17, 2021	
15	The Garden Plot	April 19, 2022	Reuben Sack
16	Undercover Bookworms	June 27, 2023	Reuben Sack
17	Splash Pad Sabotage	June 11, 2024	
	Hardy Boys Clue Book Summer Mysteries 3-in-1: Sea Life Secrets; Water-Ski Wipeout; Splash Pad Sabotage	May 12, 2026	
	Hardy Boys Clue Book Fall Mysteries 3-in-1: The Bad Luck Skate; The Pirate Ghost; The Great Pumpkin Smash	September 8, 2026	
	Hardy Boys Clue Book Spring Mysteries 3-in-1: Who let the Frogs Out?; Bug-Napped; The Garden Plot	March 16, 2027	

== Nancy Drew and The Hardy Boys Dynamite Comic Books (2017) ==
Published by Dynamite Entertainment.

1. Nancy Drew and The Hardy Boys: The Big Lie (March–August 2017; 6 issues): In this modern take, teenage brothers Frank and Joe Hardy are accused of the murder of their father – a detective in the small resort town of Bayport – and must team up with the femme fatale Nancy Drew to prove their innocence (and find the real guilty party in the process) in a twisting, hardboiled tale, complete with double-crosses, deceit, and dames.
2. Nancy Drew & The Hardy Boys: The Mystery of the Missing Adults! (July 2019)
3. Nancy Drew & The Hardy Boys: The Death of Nancy Drew (April–November 2020; 6 issues)

== Specials ==
- The Hardy Boys Detective Handbook (1959)
- The Hardy Boys Handbook: Seven Stories of Survival (1980)
- Nancy Drew and the Hardy Boys: Super Sleuths (1981)
- Nancy Drew and the Hardy Boys: Super Sleuths #2 (1984)
- Nancy Drew and the Hardy Boys: Campfire Stories (1984)
- The Hardy Boys Ghost Stories (1984)
