= The Skyfire Puzzle =

1985 novel by Franklin W. Dixon

- Author: Franklin W. Dixon
- Cover artist: Richard Williams
- Language: English
- Series: The Hardy Boys
- Genre: Detective, mystery
- Published: 1985 Wanderer Books
- Publication place: United States
- Media type: Print (hardback & paperback)
- Pages: 158
- ISBN: 0-671-49732-4 (hardcover); 0-671-49731-6 (paperback)
- Preceded by: Revenge of the Desert Phantom
- Followed by: The Mystery of the Silver Star

The Skyfire Puzzle is no. 85 in the Hardy Boys Mystery Stories, written by Franklin W. Dixon. It was published by Wanderer Books in 1985. As of 2018 this is the last Hardy Boys book to be published by Wanderer Books.

== Plot summary ==
Frank and Joe Hardy are on a stakeout in Okefenokee Swamp with their father Fenton, using their van of computer and surveillance equipment. Fenton is chasing industrial saboteurs who nearly kill him and Chet Morton. The head of security at Kennedy Space Center, Harry Stone, is baffled by a series of accidents involving the Space Shuttle Skyfire. Frank, Joe, Chet, Stone and his daughter Suzanne head to Cape Canaveral, where they meet Nat Cramer from Starglass Corporation and his security man, Pete McConnel. Starglass developed the Longeye radio telescope, which is to be placed in orbit by Skyfire. Maxwell Grant, deputy director of operations, offers the young people the chance to fly on Skyfire.

Frank, Joe and Chet train for the shuttle mission and help Stone and his aide, Lew Gorman, investigate the accidents. Occurrences indicate that someone wants the Hardys off the case: Fenton is attacked by gunmen; a masked man makes a centrifuge run wild with Joe; a caller summons the young people to a trap meeting; and hallucinogenic crystals are placed in Chet's air hose during neutral buoyancy training, causing him to attack Frank. McConnel is apparently shot by terrorist Franz Schacht, who is linked by a fingerprint.

The day before the shuttle launch, the Hardys' van is shot at by a man whom Fenton recognizes as Stone. Evidence found in Stone's house seems to prove that he and Gorman are foreign agents; they are arrested, and Suzanne is removed from the shuttle crew. During the shuttle mission, Frank links the Spacelab computer with the computer in the Hardys' van and discovers that the body profile of one of the criminals from the beach matches that of a man present during the Okefenokee attack, linking the two cases. The Hardys deduce that Cramer and McConnel are involved with the industrial espionage ring. Frank discovers McConnel never visited an emergency room after being shot. The Hardys and Chet convince the shuttle commander to fake a power failure that would strand them in orbit, tricking Cramer into making a spacewalk to send Longeye, which is set to explode, into space. Frank follows Cramer outside and frightens him into a confession. The Longeye on the shuttle is a mockup; Cramer and McConnel planned to sell the real Longeye to the spy ring. McConnel and Cramer faked Schacht's involvement, McConnel's shooting and Stone's guilt using masks of Schacht and Stone and a planted fingerprint.

== Notes ==
The Skyfire Puzzle was originally advertised under the title The Mystery of the Space Shuttle. This book, as well as #84, Revenge of the Desert Phantom, were pilots for what would become The Hardy Boys Casefiles. A third book was written in this style and was intended to be #86, but was never released due to the cancellation of the series in 1985. With the resumption of the series in 1987 #86 featured a very different writing style, and the Hardys' van, while loaded with equipment in The Skyfire Puzzle, was empty in The Mystery of the Silver Star.
