= Cross-Country Crime =

Book by Franklin W. Dixon

- Author: Franklin W. Dixon
- Language: English
- Series: Hardy Boys
- Genre: Detective, mystery
- Publisher: Pocket Books
- Publication date: 1995
- Publication place: United States
- Media type: Print
- ISBN: 0-671-50517-3
- OCLC: 33152575
- Preceded by: Crime in the Kennel
- Followed by: The Hypersonic Secret

Cross-country Crime is the 134th book in the Hardy Boys series of detective/adventure books, a series written for teenage readers over many years by a number of ghostwriters, most notably Leslie McFarlane, under the pseudonym of Franklin W. Dixon.

== Plot summary ==
The Hardy brothers go for a vacation in the town of Evergreen. There, they meet a man suffering from amnesia who is a prime suspect for a bank robbery.
