= Skin & Bones (novel) =

Book by Franklin W. Dixon

- Author: Franklin W. Dixon
- Language: English
- Series: The Hardy Boys
- Genre: Children's literature/Young adult literature
- Publisher: Grosset & Dunlap
- Publication date: 2000
- Preceded by: The Spy that Never Lies
- Followed by: Crime in the Cards

Skin & Bones is a book in the Hardy Boys series. It was first published in 2000.

== Plot summary ==
Cody Chang sells such unusual items as animal skulls, fish skeletons and reptile skins at his shop Skin & Bones in San Francisco. He calls on the Hardy Boys to investigate when the shop is ransacked. Frank and Joe suspect a criminal is trying to get revenge on Cody's policeman father by breaking his son's business down, but they have their work cut out to prove it.

== Lead characters ==
- Joe Hardy – the first Hardy brother
- Frank Hardy – the second Hardy brother
- Cody Chang – son of Sergeant Chang and proprietor of Skin & Bones
- Deb – Cody's assistant shopkeeper
- Mike Brando – the first suspect
- Dave – Cody's old dealer
