= The Last Laugh (The Hardy Boys) =

1990 novel by Franklin W. Dixon

- Author: Franklin W. Dixon
- Language: English
- Series: The Hardy Boys
- Genre: Children's literature/Young adult literature
- Publisher: Grosset & Dunlap
- Publication date: 1990

The Last Laugh is a Hardy Boys novel in the Casefiles series. It was published in 1990.

== Plot ==
The famous publisher of Zenith Comics, Barry Johns, is kidnapped from the San Diego comic-book convention by characters Human Dreadnought and Flame Fiend, observed by the Hardys. Joe and Frank think it was a publicity stunt, but then a kidnapper destroys a valuable art collection.
