= Daredevils (The Hardy Boys) =

2000 novel by Franklin W. Dixon

- Author: Franklin W. Dixon
- Language: English
- Series: Hardy Boys
- Genre: Mystery fiction, detective fiction
- Publisher: Pocket, Aladdin, Thorndike
- Publication date: 2000
- Publication place: United States
- Media type: Print (paperback)
- Pages: 148
- ISBN: 0671038613
- OCLC: 43092632
- Preceded by: The London Deception
- Followed by: A Game Called Chaos

Daredevils is the 159th title of the Hardy Boys series, written by Franklin W. Dixon. The book was first published by Pocket Books in 2000, and republished by Aladdin Paperbacks in 2002, and by Thorndike Press in 2003.

== Plot summary ==
The Hardy Boys meet popular stunt man and former family friend Terrence McCauley. His father, Brian McCauley is a friend of Fenton Hardy. Terrence became a stuntman against his father's better wishes, and now somebody's after him. After two attacks on Terrence's life, Joe Hardy enters Daredevil fest — a competition to decide the best young stuntman — as a bodyguard to protect Terrence from the stalker. More accidents happen, with Joe rescuing Terrence each time. Then, just when they think they've got the stalker, the mystery man kidnaps their parents and sends them back to square one. Frank and Joe Hardy finally find out that Slim Billy, a man who Terrence almost blew up, is the one looking for revenge and trying to kill him.
