= Eye on Crime =

1998 novel by Franklin W. Dixon

- Author: Franklin W. Dixon
- Language: English
- Series: Hardy Boys
- Genre: Detective, Mystery novel
- Publisher: Minstrel Books
- Publication date: 1998
- Publication place: United States
- Media type: Print (hardback & paperback)
- Pages: 149 pp
- ISBN: 0-380-70287-8
- OCLC: 15433330
- Preceded by: Danger in the Extreme
- Followed by: The Caribbean Cruise Caper

Eye on Crime is Volume 153 in the Hardy Boys series of mystery books for children and teens published under the pseudonym of Franklin W. Dixon.

Frank and Joe solve the mystery of some local jewelry store robberies.
