= Death and Diamonds =

Death and Diamonds may refer to:

- Death and Diamonds (film), a 1968 German film
- a book in the Undercover Brothers series
