= The Haunted Fort =

1965 book in The Hardy Boys series

- First edition
- Author: Franklin W. Dixon
- Language: English
- Series: The Hardy Boys
- Genre: Detective, mystery
- Publisher: Grosset & Dunlap
- Publication date: 1965
- Publication place: United States
- Media type: Print (hardback & paperback)
- Pages: 176 pp
- Preceded by: The Mystery of the Aztec Warrior
- Followed by: The Mystery of the Spiral Bridge

The Haunted Fort is the forty-fourth volume in the original The Hardy Boys series of mystery books for children and teens published by Grosset & Dunlap.

This book was written for the Stratemeyer Syndicate by David Grambs in 1965.

== Plot summary ==
A long-distance telephone call from Chet Morton's uncle summons Frank and Joe Hardy and their staunch pal Chet to a summer art school, located near old Fort Senandaga which is reputed to be inhabited by a ghost. The young detectives' assignment: recover two famous oil paintings stolen from the valuable Prisoner-Painter collection owned by Jefferson Davenport.

Mr. Davenport, millionaire sponsor of Millwood Art School, reveals that one of the famous Fort Senandaga pictures painted by his ancestor, General Jason Davenport, contains a clue to the hiding place of a priceless chain of gold.

Frank, Joe and Chet encounter a series of threats and obstacles as they investigate the theft of the paintings and the mystery of the hidden gold treasure. Their search is further complicated by a bitter dispute between a proud Englishman and an equally determined Frenchman over the fort's military history.
