= The Viking Symbol Mystery =

Book by Franklin W. Dixon

- Original edition
- Author: Franklin W. Dixon
- Language: English
- Series: The Hardy Boys
- Genre: Detective, mystery
- Publisher: Grosset & Dunlap
- Publication date: 1963
- Publication place: United States
- Media type: Print (hardback & paperback)
- Pages: 175 pp
- ISBN: 978-0-448-08942-3
- Preceded by: The Clue of the Screeching Owl
- Followed by: The Mystery of the Aztec Warrior

The Viking Symbol Mystery is the forty-second volume in the original The Hardy Boys series of mystery books for children and teens published by Grosset & Dunlap.

This book was written for the Stratemeyer Syndicate by Alistair M. Hunter in 1963.

== Plot summary ==
The Hardy Boys and Chet Morton travel to Canada's Northwest Territories to recover a stolen Viking artifact (a runestone). They also smash a group of thieves robbing recreational lodges around the Great Slave Lake. They visit Saskatoon, Saskatchewan; Edmonton, Alberta; Fort Smith, Northwest Territories; Wood Buffalo National Park; and Hay River.
