= The Clue of the Screeching Owl =

1962 book by Franklin W. Dixon

- Original edition
- Author: Franklin W. Dixon
- Language: English
- Series: The Hardy Boys
- Genre: Detective, mystery
- Publisher: Grosset & Dunlap
- Publication date: 1962
- Publication place: United States
- Media type: Print (hardback & paperback)
- Pages: 177 pp
- ISBN: 0-448-08941-6
- OCLC: 26183934
- Preceded by: Mystery of the Desert Giant
- Followed by: The Viking Symbol Mystery

The Clue of the Screeching Owl is the forty-first volume in the original The Hardy Boys series of mystery books for children and teens published by Grosset & Dunlap. This book was written for the Stratemeyer Syndicate by James Buechler in 1962.

== Plot summary ==
When dogs and men suddenly disappear, and strange screams fill the night, fantastic stories of vengeful ghosts are almost believable. It is these strange happenings which bring Frank and Joe Hardy to the Pocono Mountains to help their father's friend, a retired police captain, solve the mystery of Black Hollow.

But when the Hardy Boys and Chet Morton arrive at Captain Thomas Maguire's cabin on the edge of the hollow, he has disappeared. In the woods the boys find only a few slim clues: a flashlight bearing the initials T.M., a few scraps of bright plaid cloth, and two empty shotgun shells which had been fired recently.

Frank and Joe are determined to find the captain, despite Chet's misgivings after a night of weird and terrifying screams. Neighbors of the missing man insist that the bloodcurdling cries are those of a legendary witch who stalks Black Hollow seeking vengeance.

Strangely, it is a small puppy that helps the boys disclose a most unusual and surprising set of circumstances, involving a mute boy, an elusive hermit, and a fearless puma trainer.

== Television adaptation ==
This book was also adapted in 1977 as the episode "The Mystery of Witches' Hollow" for the 1977 Hardy Boys/Nancy Drew Mysteries TV series.

== See also ==
- List of Hardy Boys books
