= The Sting of the Scorpion =

1979 book by Franklin W. Dixon

- Author: Franklin W. Dixon
- Language: English
- Series: The Hardy Boys
- Genre: Detective, mystery
- Publisher: Grosset & Dunlap
- Publication date: 1979
- Publication place: United States
- Media type: Print (hardback & paperback)
- Pages: 180 pp
- ISBN: 0-448-08958-0
- OCLC: 4900085
- LC Class: PZ7.D644 St
- Preceded by: The Firebird Rocket
- Followed by: Night of the Werewolf

The Sting of the Scorpion is the fifty-eighth volume in the original The Hardy Boys series of mystery books for children and teens published by Grosset & Dunlap. Written by James D. Lawrence for the Stratemeyer Syndicate in 1979, it was published under the pseudonym Franklin W. Dixon.

The first four printings contained a plug for Night of the Werewolf (Volume 59), but this was removed after the court case involving Grosset & Dunlap, Simon & Schuster, and the Stratmeyer Syndicate was settled.

== Plot summary ==
During their father's investigation of the ruthless Scorpio gang of terrorists, the Hardy Boys witness an explosion and an elephant falling from an airship named Safari Queen of Quinn Airport which was carrying animals of the newly opened Wild World Zoo. Strange events are happening at Wild World, so the Hardy Boys search for the truth.

They fall into a trap and almost escape injury. They capture the gang in an all-out fight.
