= The Firebird Rocket =

1978 book by Franklin W. Dixon

- Author: Franklin W. Dixon
- Language: English
- Series: The Hardy Boys
- Genre: Detective, mystery
- Publisher: Grosset & Dunlap
- Publication date: 1978
- Publication place: United States
- Media type: Print (hardback & paperback)
- Pages: 180 pp
- ISBN: 0-448-08957-2
- OCLC: 3850638
- LC Class: PZ7.D644 Fh
- Preceded by: The Jungle Pyramid
- Followed by: The Sting of the Scorpion

The Firebird Rocket is the fifty-seventh volume in the Hardy Boys series of mystery books for children and teens published by Grosset & Dunlap. The book was written for the Stratemeyer Syndicate by Vincent Buranelli in 1978.

== Plot summary ==
The Hardy Boys help their detective father, Fenton Hardy, search for a famous rocket scientist whose disappearance endangers the launching of the Firebird rocket from the Woomera Test Range. They are threatened multiple times, but still do not give up with their lives at risk. Frank and Joe Hardy aid their father and others. However, they soon learn that they are working for a criminal. While they are captured, the police arrive and rescue them, arresting the criminals except for the true mastermind who tries to flee. However, Frank and Joe stop the truck he uses and he is captured.

== See also ==
- List of Hardy Boys books
