= The Search for the Snow Leopard =

Book by Franklin W. Dixon

- Author: Franklin W. Dixon
- Language: English
- Series: Hardy Boys
- Genre: Detective, mystery
- Publisher: Pocket Books
- Publication date: August 1996
- Publication place: United States
- Media type: Print (paperback)
- Pages: 160 pp (first edition, paperback)
- ISBN: 978-0-671-50525-7 (first edition, paperback)
- OCLC: 35124897
- Preceded by: The Alaskan Adventure
- Followed by: Slam Dunk Sabotage

The Search for the Snow Leopard is a Hardy Boys Digest novel, written by Franklin W. Dixon. It is the 139th volume in the Hardy Boys series of detective/adventure books and was published in 1996.

== Plot summary ==
Frank and Joe, with their best bud Chet Morton, investigate when a princess's pet snow leopard goes missing from the Bayport Zoo. They become embroiled in a more dangerous case when the princess herself is kidnapped.
