= Ultra-Thriller =

Fictional book series

The Ultra-Thriller series is a detective/action fiction series published between August 1992 and June 1993 by Archway Paperbacks (an imprint of Simon & Schuster). It was a spin-off of The Hardy Boys Casefiles and the Tom Swift IV series and joined boy inventor Tom Swift with the crime solving Hardy boys, Frank & Joe. Although The Hardy Boys pseudonym, Franklin W. Dixon was used, this series was more akin to the Tom Swift IV series by Victor Appleton.

== List of titles ==
- Alien Factor
- Time Bomb
