= River Rats (The Hardy Boys) =

1997 novel by Franklin W. Dixon

- Author: Franklin W. Dixon
- Language: English
- Series: The Hardy Boys
- Genre: Children's literature/Young adult literature
- Publisher: Grosset & Dunlap
- Publication date: 1997

River Rats is a Hardy Boys novel from the Casefiles series, published in 1997.

== Plot summary ==
Frank and Joe Hardy head to the Big Bison River in Montana to experience its beauty and wonder, through the form of water sports. They are greeted by Owen Watson, a friend, and head off into the river, but witness a hitman killing Owen in broad daylight. The brothers then promise themselves to find the murderer, and avoid any obstacles, distractions, and firepower. They must find the culprit, end the environmental struggle, and bring him to justice, if they ever want to solve the case.
