= Mystery of the Desert Giant =

1961 book by Franklin W. Dixon

- Original edition
- Author: Franklin W. Dixon
- Language: English
- Series: The Hardy Boys
- Genre: Detective, mystery
- Publisher: Grosset & Dunlap
- Publication date: 1961
- Publication place: United States
- Media type: Print (hardback & paperback)
- Pages: 192 pp
- Preceded by: The Mystery of the Chinese Junk
- Followed by: The Clue of the Screeching Owl

Mystery of the Desert Giant is the fortieth volume in the original The Hardy Boys series of mystery books for children and teens published by Grosset & Dunlap.

This book was written for the Stratemeyer Syndicate by James Buechler in 1961.

== Plot summary ==
The Hardy Boys and Chet Morton search on the California desert for missing industrialist Willard Grafton and break up a gang of criminals whose motive is defrauding the US government.

Much of this book takes place in Blythe, California, and it cites real, current locales, such as Hobson Way and the giant intaglios north of Blythe on U.S. Highway 95. In the end, the boys discover that Grafton's fellow explorer had a part in the gang of criminal's racket. With this, Grafton is rescued, and the thugs who apparently were smuggling illegal checks across the border are caught.
