= The Mystery of the Aztec Warrior =

1964 book by Franklin W. Dixon

- First edition
- Author: Franklin W. Dixon
- Language: English
- Series: The Hardy Boys
- Genre: Detective, mystery
- Publisher: Grosset & Dunlap
- Publication date: 1964
- Publication place: United States
- Media type: Print (hardback & paperback)
- Pages: 178 pp
- Preceded by: The Viking Symbol Mystery
- Followed by: The Haunted Fort

The Mystery of the Aztec Warrior is the forty-third volume in the original The Hardy Boys series of mystery books for children and teens published by Grosset & Dunlap.

This book was written for the Stratemeyer Syndicate by Harriet S. Adams, the daughter of Edward Stratemeyer, in 1964.

== Plot summary ==
The handwritten will of a deceased world-traveller is strange and mysterious. Its instructions are to deliver "the valuable object to the rightful owner, a descendant of an Aztec warrior". What is the valuable object and where is it? What is the name of the owner and where is he? Frank and Joe Hardy have only one clue to work with: the name of a complete stranger who can help find the answers, Roberto Hermosa.

Despite the harassments, the threats, and the attacks made upon them by an unknown, sinister gang, Frank and Joe unravel clue after clue in their adventure-packed search for the living descendant of the mighty Aztec nation which once ruled Mexico. The hunt leads to a marketplace in Mexico City, to the Pyramids at Teotihuacan, to the tombs of Oaxaca-where Chet Morton, the Hardy's buddy, is nearly buried alive by foul play.

Frank and Joe are caught trying to free Senior Tatloc. They try to fight off their attackers but the men are trained fighters and quickly overpower them. Frank and Joe are left bound and gagged themselves in a hut while their captors take Tatloc to another location. They are later freed by Chet Morton. It takes as much high courage as clever deduction for the young detectives to defeat their ruthless foes and to decipher the fascinating secrets of the strange and mysterious will.

In the end, Frank is kidnapped once again while searching for Tatloc. He is dragged into a hut. Frank tries to cry for help, but his captor gags him. Then he ties Frank up and imprisons him with Tatloc. Joe and Chet soon discover where Frank and Tatloc are, the pair are rescued, and their kidnapper is caught.
