= Mystery of the Whale Tattoo =

1968 book by Franklin W. Dixon

- Author: Franklin W. Dixon
- Language: English
- Series: Hardy Boys
- Genre: Detective, mystery
- Publisher: Grosset & Dunlap
- Publication date: 1968
- Publication place: United States
- Media type: Print (hardback & paperback)
- Pages: 174 pp
- ISBN: 0-448-08947-5
- OCLC: 437427
- Preceded by: The Secret Agent on Flight 101
- Followed by: The Arctic Patrol Mystery

Mystery of the Whale Tattoo is the forty-seventh volume in the original The Hardy Boys series of mystery books for children and teens published by Grosset & Dunlap.

This book was outlined by Andrew E. Svenson and written by Jerrold Mundis in 1968 for the Stratemeyer Syndicate.

This story is based in Bayport where two teenagers, the Hardy Boys, try to solve the mystery of pickpockets at a traveling carnival. Both of the Hardy Boys had something very valuable stolen from them, and they later find out that a group of teenagers are the culprits. Each one of the group has a whale tattoo.

== Cultural references ==
The plot of the novel is adapted and repeatedly referenced in the Hulu series Only Murders in the Building.
