= Running on Empty =

Running on Empty or Runnin' on Empty may refer to:

- Running on Empty (album), an album by Jackson Browne
  - "Running on Empty" (song), the title song
- Running on Empty (1982 film), an Australian film directed by John Clark
- Running on Empty (1988 film), an American film directed by Sidney Lumet
- Running on Empty (2006 film), a 2006 German film
- Running on Empty (2024 film), an American film directed by Daniel André
- Running on Empty (novel), a Hardy Boys Casefiles novel
- "Running on Empty", a song by UFO from Walk on Water
- Runnin' on Empty Vol. 1 and Vol. 2, albums by The Mummies
