= River Rats =

River Rats may refer to:

- Albany River Rats, an ice hockey team in the American Hockey League!
- River Rats, a Hardy Boys novel.
- "River Rats", the seventh episode of All Grown Up!.
