= Running on Empty (novel) =

1990 young adult novel by Franklin W. Dixon

- First edition
- Author: Franklin W. Dixon
- Cover artist: Brian Kotzky
- Language: English
- Series: Hardy Boys casebook series
- Genre: Detective, Mystery novel
- Published: February 1990 Simon Pulse
- Publication place: United States
- Media type: Print (Paperback)
- ISBN: 978-0-671-67484-7 (first edition, paperback)
- OCLC: 20967355
- Preceded by: The Dead Season
- Followed by: Danger Zone

Running on Empty is the 36th young adult novel in the long running and successful Hardy Boys casebook series for boys written by Franklin W. Dixon. It was first published by Simon Pulse in 1990. In it The Hardy Boys investigate the disappearance of their friend, Chet Morton, and go undercover.

== Plot introduction ==
Thieves hot wire and steal Chet Morton's prize Corvette. But when he tries to catch those responsible, he gets kidnapped himself.

In response the brothers Frank and Joe go in chase of Chet's kidnappers. The two brothers attempt to join the gangs to get leads on Chet and uncover a chopshop ring. With the Camaros, Caddys and Corvettes, the Hardys are putting themselves on the line.
