= The Hardy Boys Detective Handbook =

1959 novel by Franklin W. Dixon

- First edition
- Author: Franklin W. Dixon
- Language: English
- Series: Hardy Boys
- Genre: Detective, Mystery novel, Non-fiction
- Publisher: Grosset & Dunlap
- Publication date: 1959
- Publication place: United States
- Media type: Print (Hardback & Paperback)
- Pages: 248 pp

The Hardy Boys Detective Handbook is a special volume in the original Hardy Boys book series published by Grosset & Dunlap.

The book is composed of several didactic short fictional stories illustrating various actual crime detection methods featuring the Hardy Boys and their friends. Although some of the material is dated, the book remains a useful primer on topics such as basic forensics techniques, including the examination of fingerprints and shoe prints at crime scenes, as well as a brief introduction to the basic properties of various illegal drugs.

Four editions, comprising 41 separate printings, were issued:

- Edition 1 (1959) featured commentary from Dominick A. Spina, a retired NYPD detective. Dust jacket
- Edition 2 (1959, first reprinted in 1962) As above, but picture cover
- Edition 3 (1966-text/1972-artwork) became necessary when Captain Spina was indicted (although eventually acquitted) as a result of a corruption scandal in Newark, New Jersey. The Stratemeyer Syndicate turned to retired FBI agent William F. Flynn for expert insight in the revised edition. The text was also reduced in length from the original.
- Edition 4 (1987) was only slightly altered in content, but it included new artwork. The Detective Handbook had always been an oversized book compared to the novels in the Hardy Boys series, so with these changes it was reconfigured to match the rest of the collection.
