= Nancy Drew: Girl Detective =

Book series

Riverboat Ruse, from the Girl Detective series

Nancy Drew: Girl Detective is a 2004–2012 book series which replaced the long-running Nancy Drew mystery series. This new series is written in first person narration, from Nancy's point of view, and features updated versions of the main Nancy Drew characters. New secondary characters are introduced to populate River Heights and appear over multiple books, adding a framework to Nancy's world.

Though this series had some improvements over the Nancy Drew Mystery Stories, the drastic change in the main characters' personalities was hard for many readers to accept. The series was negatively reviewed by many fans of the series, mainly over the change in Nancy's character. In 2008, the series was changed into a trilogy format, which gained even more negative reviews than before. Simon & Schuster cut back to 4 books a year in 2010, before low sales finally forced the cancellation of the Girl Detective series in 2012. In 2013, the Nancy Drew Diaries series was launched as the replacement for Girl Detective.

== History ==
In the 90s and early 2000s, sales of the Nancy Drew novel series began to drop. At a Nancy Drew conference held in early 2005 in New York, a Simon and Schuster representative said that the digests had been selling about 30,000 copies. In order to boost sales, the original series was ended and the Nancy Drew series re-launched.

This new incarnation of Nancy Drew was initially supervised by Bonnie Bryant (Jacobson), with three ghost writers writing the initial six books. The first volume of the new series, Without a Trace, reached the New York Times bestseller list in the Children's Series category and #113 on USA Today's Top 150 sellers list due to the .99 cents introductory price.

=== Differences from the original series ===
The publisher describes the series in the following way:

Nancy Drew has a new spring in her step. And it's no wonder: We've given her whole world more oomph. In the all-new Nancy Drew, we've enhanced and expanded everything you've loved about Nancy, Bess, and George, and the rest of Nancy's crew. You loved the series before, but with more dimension, you'll love the series even more now! Learn why River Heights is such a hotbed of criminal activity, meet some new key sources of information for Nancy on all her cases, become acquainted with Nancy's new nemesis, and become even closer friends with Bess and George. And that's just the beginning ...

Nancy Drew in this version is a less than perfect teenage girl prone to forgetfulness, an object of jokes, and interested in other subjects over mysteries. Bess Marvin has gained skills in mechanics and computers and is no longer slightly overweight, and described as fashionable and trendy. George Fayne has become moody and sloppily dressed in this series, always more interested in tech and sarcastic retorts than solving mysteries. Bess and George also gain siblings and family members with careers. Ned now lives in River Heights, working part-time for his father's newspaper The River Heights Bugle.

=== Setting ===
The Nancy Drew: Girl Detective novels are usually based in the fictional town of River Heights, which is located in Illinois. Other fictional cities that are mentioned are Silver Creek, East Bank, Cutler Falls, and Trib Falls, which are all near River Heights and the Muskoka River. River Heights is a 1-hour drive west of the real city, Chicago, which has been mentioned frequently.

== Main characters ==
- Nancy Drew is an 18-year-old young woman who lives with her father in River Heights. When she was only 3 years old, her mother died, something with which she has had trouble coming to terms. She and her two best friends Bess and George and boyfriend Ned Nickerson solve mysteries in River Heights and places they visit. Nancy is confident, determined (which her dad calls a 'stubborn streak'), and sometimes forgetful when thinking about a case. Her friends help her out to stay on track. Nancy has shoulder-length, strawberry blond hair, blue eyes, and is said to be 5 ft 8 in (1.73 m). She thinks style is okay but prefers comfort.
- Georgia "George" Fayne, is one of Nancy's best friends. She is an athletic tomboy who is really good with modern technology. She has brown eyes, short brown hair and is tall and thin and does not care about fashion at all. Unlike the original series, George is also now characterized as a sarcastic pessimist.
- Bess Marvin is Nancy's other best friend and George's cousin, though they don't have much in common except their friendship to Nancy. Bess is flirty and, according to Nancy, seems perfect in every way. She has blue eyes, blond hair, and curves, unlike her cousin George, who has brown eyes, short brown hair, and is skinny. In Murder on the Set, Bess is said to be 5 ft 2 in (1.57 m).
- Ned Nickerson is Nancy's boyfriend. He sometimes comes along with Nancy on her cases. Ned is in college and tends to be casual. He works for his father's newspaper, the River Heights Bugle. In Murder on the Set, Ned is said to be 6 ft 1 in (1.85 m).
- Carson Drew, Nancy's father, is a lawyer. He is famous in River Heights for being good at solving crimes, a gift he passed down to his daughter. He will sometimes refer small cases his clients have to his daughter. In False Notes, he celebrates his birthday.
- Hannah Gruen has been living with the Drew family ever since Nancy's mother died. Hannah is their housekeeper and is like a member of the family. She is protective of Nancy, sometimes even when she is working on a case.
- Deirdre Shannon is Nancy's nemesis and former classmate. Deirdre's father, like Nancy's, is also a lawyer in River Heights. However, Deirdre is an obnoxious, spoiled brat, and frequently being compared to Nancy by her parents. Thus, Deirdre is jealous of Nancy, and the two's rivalry can be traced back to the first grade. Deirdre hates her grade school nickname, DeeDee, and becomes irritated if called by that; thus, George Fayne often refers to her in that way. She has a not-so-subtle big crush on Ned Nickerson, even though he is dating Nancy. With her black hair, green eyes and pale skin, she looks like a Cruella de Vil II. In Murder on the Set she is mistakenly named "Dierdre Simmons".
- Chief Pete McGinnis is the local police chief. Unlike the old Nancy Drew stories, in which he and Nancy had a friendly relationship, their relationship is more antagonistic in the new series. Nancy beats him to crime scenes and solves mysteries before him, so he is jealous of her success. In Fishing for Clues, his first name is revealed to be Pete.
- Harold Safer is Nancy's neighbor. He owns the town's cheese shop, and likes sunsets and Broadway musicals. In the first book, Without a Trace, Harold is accused of smashing a zucchini patch. Nancy and her friends help him prove his innocence. In Lights, Camera... and Action!, he co-stars with Nancy on a TV movie being shot in River Heights.
- Charlie Adams works at Carr's Garage, and is a friend of Nancy. He often doesn't charge Nancy, because he is in love with her (though those feelings are not reciprocated). In Pit of Vipers, Nancy is surprised to discover he is a snake collector, when he gets arrested on suspicion of stealing a snake from the local zoo.
- Luther Eldridge (originally Atchinson) is an expert on River Heights history and he often helps Nancy on her cases. Nancy likes spending time with Luther because she can learn interesting things from him. She was a friend of his daughter, but Luther's entire family died in a car accident when Nancy was still young; afterwards, Luther quit his job while struggling with depression.
- Mrs. Mahoney is the wealthiest person in River Heights, and the owner of Rackham Industries. Her husband Julius's ancestors were a part of the Rackham Gang, who committed the infamous River Heights Heist and escaped with the money on the Muskoka River (as explained in Action!). While she is very charitable and kind, her late husband is described as the complete opposite.
- Jake Perrault is a young, handsome movie star who is the son of famous River Heights mystery writer Hazel Perrault. All girls swoon over him but he is in love with Nancy who ignores him.

== List of titles ==
Books in the Nancy Drew: Girl Detective series were released in paperback format by Simon & Schuster. From 2008 to 2012, the stories were presented in three-book arcs, drawing the mystery out over three separate, but linked, titles. The re-designed covers feature model Jessica Silverman as Nancy Drew.

=== Main series ===
Titles and publication dates (main series)
Trilogy	No.	Title	Publication date	Author
n/a	1	Without a Trace	March 1, 2004	Unknown
n/a	2	A Race Against Time	March 1, 2004	Unknown
n/a	3	False Notes	March 1, 2004	Unknown
n/a	4	High Risk	March 1, 2004	Unknown
n/a	5	Lights, Camera...	May 1, 2004	Unknown
n/a	6	Action!	July 1, 2004	Unknown
n/a	7	The Stolen Relic	September 1, 2004	Unknown
n/a	8	The Scarlet Macaw Scandal	November 1, 2004	Unknown
n/a	9	Secret of the Spa	January 1, 2005	Unknown
n/a	10	Uncivil Acts	March 1, 2005	Unknown
n/a	11	Riverboat Ruse	May 1, 2005	Unknown
n/a	12	Stop the Clock	July 1, 2005	George Edward Stanley
n/a	13	Trade Wind Danger	September 1, 2005	Unknown
n/a	14	Bad Times, Big Crimes	November 1, 2005	Unknown
n/a	15	Framed	January 1, 2006	George Edward Stanley
n/a	16	Dangerous Plays	March 1, 2006	
n/a	17	En Garde	May 1, 2006	
n/a	18	Pit of Vipers	July 1, 2006	
n/a	19	The Orchid Thief	September 1, 2006	
n/a	20	Getting Burned	October 24, 2006	
n/a	21	Close Encounters	December 26, 2006	
n/a	22	Dressed to Steal	February 27, 2007	
n/a	23	Troubled Waters	April 24, 2007	
n/a	24	Murder on the Set	May 8, 2007	
n/a	25	Trails of Treachery	August 21, 2007	
n/a	26	Fishing for Clues	October 27, 2007	
n/a	27	Intruder	December 26, 2007	
n/a	28	Mardi Gras Masquerade	February 5, 2008	
n/a	29	The Stolen Bones	April 22, 2008	
Perfect Mystery Trilogy	30	Pageant Perfect Crime	June 3, 2008	
Perfect Mystery Trilogy	31	Perfect Cover	July 29, 2008	
Perfect Mystery Trilogy	32	The Perfect Escape	October 7, 2008	
Identity Mystery Trilogy	33	Secret Identity	December 16, 2008	
Identity Mystery Trilogy	34	Identity Theft	January 27, 2009	
Identity Mystery Trilogy	35	Identity Revealed	March 24, 2009	
Model Mystery Trilogy	36	Model Crime	June 2, 2009	
Model Mystery Trilogy	37	Model Menace	August 4, 2009	
Model Mystery Trilogy	38	Model Suspect	October 6, 2009	
Eco-Mystery Trilogy	39	Green-Eyed Monster	December 1, 2009	
Eco-Mystery Trilogy	40	Green with Envy	February 9, 2010	
Eco-Mystery Trilogy	41	Seeing Green	April 6, 2010	
Sabotage Mystery Trilogy	42	Secret Sabotage	June 8, 2010	Ross A.
Sabotage Mystery Trilogy	43	Serial Sabotage	October 12, 2010	Ross A.
Sabotage Mystery Trilogy	44	Sabotage Surrender	February 8, 2011	Ross A.
Malibu Mayhem Trilogy	45	California Schemin'	June 14, 2011	
Malibu Mayhem Trilogy	46	Mystery at Malachite Mansion	October 18, 2011	
Malibu Mayhem Trilogy	47	Stalk, Don't Run	February 21, 2012	

=== Super Mysteries ===
Titles and publication dates (Super Mysteries)
#	Title	Publication date
1	Where's Nancy?	June 1, 2005
2	Once Upon a Crime	June 1, 2006
3	Real Fake	July 10, 2007
4	Ghost Stories	August 5, 2008

== Spin-offs ==
=== Nancy Drew and the Clue Crew ===
Starting in 2006, Aladdin Paperbacks published a new series to replace the Nancy Drew Notebooks series for younger readers; it exists in the same universe as the Nancy Drew: Girl Detective series.

It features Nancy Drew, George Fayne, and Bess Marvin as eight-year-olds in the third grade at River Heights Elementary School, and solving kid sized mysteries, from finding a stolen ice cream formula entry to the culprit who cut the cake before the bride. This series also sets George's mother working her own catering company, and reveals George's real name to be Georgia. This series ended in 2015 to be replaced by the Nancy Drew Clue Book series.

Titles, authorship, and publication dates (Clue Crew)
#	Title	Publication date
1	Sleepover Sleuths	June 1, 2006
2	Scream for Ice Cream	June 1, 2006
3	Pony Problems	August 1, 2006
4	The Cinderella Ballet Mystery	October 3, 2006
5	Case of the Sneaky Snowman	December 5, 2006
6	The Fashion Disaster	February 6, 2007
7	The Circus Scare	April 10, 2007
8	Lights, Camera... Cats!	May 8, 2007
9	The Halloween Hoax	August 7, 2007
10	Ticket Trouble	September 25, 2007
11	Ski School Sneak	November 27, 2007
12	Valentine's Day Secret	December 26, 2007
13	Chick-napped!	March 4, 2008
14	The Zoo Crew	May 6, 2008
15	Mall Madness	July 1, 2008
16	Thanksgiving Thief	September 9, 2008
17	Wedding Day Disaster	November 4, 2008
18	Earth Day Escapade	January 6, 2009
19	April Fool's Day	March 10, 2009
20	Treasure Trouble	May 19, 2009
21	Double Take	July 21, 2009
22	Unicorn Uproar	September 8, 2009
23	Babysitting Bandit	November 10, 2009
24	Princess Mix-up Mystery	December 29, 2009
25	Buggy Breakout	March 9, 2010
26	Camp Creepy	May 4, 2010
27	Cat Burglar Caper	September 14, 2010
28	Time Thief	January 4, 2011
29	Designed for Disaster	May 3, 2011
30	Dance Off	September 13, 2011
31	The Make-a-Pet Mystery	January 3, 2012
32	Cape Mermaid Mystery	May 1, 2012
33	The Pumpkin Patch Puzzle	September 25, 2012
34	Cupcake Chaos	March 5, 2013
35	Cooking Camp Disaster	July 9, 2013
36	The Secret of the Scarecrow	November 12, 2013
37	The Flower Show Fiasco	March 25, 2014
38	A Musical Mess	July 8, 2014
39	Museum Mayhem	November 4, 2014
40	Butterfly Blues	March 24, 2015

=== Nancy Drew and the Hardy Boys Super Mystery ===
A crossover with The Hardy Boys: Undercover Brothers series. The stories are told in first person, alternating chapters, between Frank's or Joe's, and Nancy's perspective. The first title in the series acts as an introduction between the characters. This series published one title per year until the end of the Girl Detective and Undercover Brothers series in 2012.

Titles and publication dates (Hardy Boys Super Mysteries)
#	Title	Publication date
1	Terror on Tour	June 5, 2007
2	Danger Overseas	May 6, 2008
3	Club Dread	May 5, 2009
4	Gold Medal Murder	July 6, 2010
5	Bonfire Masquerade	July 12, 2011
6	Stage Fright	July 10, 2012

== Graphic novels ==
Beginning in 2005, Papercutz began issuing a new series of Nancy Drew graphic novels as an offshoot of the Girl Detective series. The series is edited by Jim Salicrup, written by Stefan Petrucha, and illustrated by Sho Murase. All the storylines are completely new. The manga-style illustrations and technical allusions (Nancy's hybrid car, George's tablet PC) give Nancy and her friends a 21st-century spin.

There are several nods and tie-ins to other Nancy Drew media. In The Old Fashioned Mystery of The Haunted Dollhouse, the citizens of River Heights dresses up as if they were in the 1930s to celebrate an event. In Global Warming, Dr. Craven from Her Interactive's PC game The Creature of Kapu Cave appears. The Dana Girls and their friends appear in both High School Musical Mystery and High School Musical Mystery Part 2: The Lost Verse, initially as rivals to Nancy, though they eventually team up to solve the mystery.

The series also has continuity, and several multi-issue cases. Issues #9-11 (Ghost in the Machinery, The Disoriented Express, Monkey-Wrench Blues) form "The High Miles Mystery" trilogy; Issues #17 and #18 (Night of the Living Chatchke and City Under the Basement) form a two-part storyline; and Issues #20 and #21 (High School Musical Mystery and High School Musical Mystery Part 2: The Lost Verse) form The High School Musical Mystery, which also features fellow Stratemeyer Syndicate series The Dana Girls.

In 2010, the series was rebooted as Nancy Drew: Girl Detective - The New Case Files. These new novels center around a River Heights that has become obsessed with vampire books. The third novel of this new series, Together with the Hardy Boys, featured a crossover with The Hardy Boys, who also had their own graphic novel series at that time. This ended up being the last issue, and the series was cancelled after that. In 2014, the series began being re-released as an offshoot of the new Nancy Drew Diaries series, containing two volumes per issue.

The Papercutz graphic novels are no longer in print but in 2022, Dynamite Entertainment republished the first three volumes in one omnibus.

Titles and publication dates (graphic novels)
#	Title	Publication date	Re-release date
1	The Demon of River Heights	October 13, 2005	February 11, 2014
2	Writ in Stone	October 13, 2005	February 11, 2014
3	The Old Fashioned Mystery of The Haunted Dollhouse	November 29, 2005	July 29, 2014
4	The Girl Who Wasn't There	January 24, 2006	July 29, 2014
5	The Fake Heir	April 18, 2006	October 21, 2014
6	Mr. Cheeters is Missing	August 8, 2006	October 21, 2014
7	The Charmed Bracelet	November 28, 2006	February 24, 2015
8	Global Warning	March 6, 2007	February 24, 2015
9	Ghost in the Machinery	May 5, 2007	July 7, 2015
10	The Disoriented Express	August 7, 2007	July 7, 2015
11	Monkey-Wrench Blues	November 13, 2007	December 1, 2015
12	Dress Reversal	January 22, 2008	December 1, 2015
13	Doggone Town	May 27, 2008	May 17, 2016
14	Sleight of Dan	August 19, 2008	May 17, 2016
15	Tiger Counter	November 25, 2008	November 8, 2016
16	What Goes Up	February 3, 2009	November 8, 2016
17	Night of the Living Chatchke	April 28, 2009	July 25, 2017
18	City Under the Basement	July 31, 2009	July 25, 2017
19	Cliffhanger	November 24, 2009	December 12, 2017
20	High School Musical Mystery	June 8, 2010	December 12, 2017
21	High School Musical Mystery Part 2: The Lost Verse	August 17, 2010	December 12, 2017

Titles and publication dates (The New Case Files)
#	Title	Publication date
1	Nancy Drew: Vampire Slayer	September 14, 2010
2	A Vampire's Kiss	October 21, 2010
3	Together with the Hardy Boys	August 2, 2011

== See also ==
- The Hardy Boys: Undercover Brothers, reboot of The Hardy Boys series, with which Girl Detective had a spin-off crossover series
