= The Caribbean Cruise Caper =

1999 novel by Franklin W. Dixon

- First edition cover
- Author: Franklin W. Dixon
- Language: English
- Series: The Hardy Boys
- Genre: Detective, Mystery
- Publisher: Pocket Books
- Publication date: 1999
- Publication place: United States
- Media type: Print (Paperback)
- Pages: 160
- Preceded by: The Dangerous Transmission
- Followed by: Wreck and Roll

The Caribbean Cruise Caper is volume 154 in the Hardy Boys series of detective/mystery books by Franklin W. Dixon, published in 1999.

== Plot summary ==
Frank and Joe Hardy go on a Caribbean mystery cruise. The cruise allows teenage detectives to solve simulated crimes with the Hardy Boys as judges.

However, someone onboard soon puts the ship in peril. Frank and Joe, with the help of the young detectives, must find the culprit before the ship sinks.
