= The Secret Agent on Flight 101 =

1967 book by Franklin W. Dixon

- Author: Franklin W. Dixon
- Language: English
- Series: The Hardy Boys
- Genre: Detective, mystery
- Publisher: Grosset & Dunlap
- Publication date: 1967
- Publication place: United States
- Media type: Print (hardback & paperback)
- Pages: 176 pp
- ISBN: 0-448-08946-7
- OCLC: 34771258
- Preceded by: The Mystery of the Spiral Bridge
- Followed by: Mystery of the Whale Tattoo

The Secret Agent on Flight 101 is the forty-sixth volume in the original The Hardy Boys series of mystery books for children and teens published by Grosset & Dunlap.

This book was written for the Stratemeyer Syndicate by Tom Mulvey (who also wrote volume 8 of the Tom Swift Jr. series) in 1967. Mulvey was also responsible for editing other Stratemeyer Syndicate stories with aviation content.

== Plot summary ==
Joe and Frank Hardy go to a magic show with their dad. After the show is done, their dad asks Hexton how the vanishing act was performed. Hexton offers to do the trick on Fenton Hardy. When their dad disappears, he does not reappear. Hexton says their dad is simply playing a joke on them; Joe and Frank do not believe this. They suspect he was kidnapped. To be sure, Joe and Frank study some of their dad's records; they find Hexton was the leader of an international gang. The first place they look is in a lighthouse that they suspected he might be in. They go inside and see a guard; the guard tries to escape but cannot. He says their dad was here but is not anymore. Though not sure, the boys suspect that their dad was purposely moved to a more secretive place. The boys check in Hexton's castle but get caught. They find that the hinges of the place they were locked in were bad; Joe and Frank take turns to pry them off. Finally, the boys escape. The boys overhear the gang talking about stealing some jewels. They now have a second job to do.

As the boys were leaving, the criminals try to recapture them. It ends up that the police have come just in time to save the boys. Although the boys are fine, the criminals escape. Hexton steals the jewels and takes a ride on Flight 101. Joe and Frank also take a ride on Flight 101, but see nothing suspicious. When everyone was exiting the plane, the boys think they see Hexton. As they try to capture him, another person helps in the capturing of Hexton. It ends up that the person was Fenton Hardy. All along Joe and Frank's dad was spying on Flight 101.
