= Past and Present Danger =

2001 novel by Franklin W. Dixon

- Author: Franklin W. Dixon
- Original title: Past and Present Danger: Hardy Boys#166
- Publisher: Pocket Books
- Publication date: 2001

Past and Present Danger is a Hardy Boys novel. It was first published in 2001 by Pocket Books.

Clayton Silvers was once a well-known figure in investigative reporting, then he was charged with bribery and fraud. He has returned to Bayport, but an old high-school friend defends his case: Gertrude Hardy, Frank and Joe's aunt. Now, Frank and Joe do not know whom to trust, but, as the level of danger escalates, they must choose or pay the price.
