= The End of the Trail =

Hardy Boys novel

- Language: English
- Series: Hardy Boys
- Genre: Detective, mystery
- Publisher: Wanderer Books
- Publication date: 2000
- Publication place: United States
- Media type: Print (paperback)

The End of the Trail is a Hardy Boys book. It was first published in 2000.

== Plot summary ==
Biff Hooper, Phil Cohen, and Chet Morton go with the Hardy Boys on a hike up the Appalachian Trail, but things take a turn for the worse when Biff is hurt. The boys go to Morgan's Quarry, the nearest town, for help, and find a bag of cash in the middle of the road. Now, the Hardy Boys must find the owner, or face death.
