= The Arctic Patrol Mystery =

1969 novel by Franklin W. Dixon

- Author: Franklin W. Dixon
- Language: English
- Series: The Hardy Boys
- Genre: Detective, mystery
- Publisher: Grosset & Dunlap
- Publication date: 1969
- Publication place: United States
- Media type: Print (hardback & paperback)
- Pages: 176 pp
- ISBN: 0-448-08948-3
- OCLC: 38559604
- Preceded by: Mystery of the Whale Tattoo
- Followed by: The Bombay Boomerang

The Arctic Patrol Mystery is the forty-eighth volume in the original The Hardy Boys series of mystery books for children and teens published by Grosset & Dunlap.

This book was written for the Stratemeyer Syndicate by Andrew E. Svenson in 1969.

== Plot summary ==
The Hardy Boys and Chet Morton fly to Iceland to look for Rex Hallbjornsson, a sailor owed a payout from an insurance company. Before they leave Bayport, someone attempts to kidnap Frank. An American astronaut has disappeared in Iceland while studying the volcanoes. Frank finds a glove which may have been dropped by the astronaut next to a sulfur pit. The Hardys take a flight on a private plane to Akureyri. The pilot is a phony and forces a landing on a glacier, where the Hardys are fooled by a phony rescue helicopter that picks up the phony pilot and leaves them behind. They try to use the radio, but the phony pilot has hidden the frequency crystal. They find it and make contact with the radio tower at Reykjavík. Another helicopter comes to pick up the Hardys. They go to Akureyri and visit a phony Rex Hallbjornsson. Returning to Reykjavík, they see Chet wandering in front of the hotel with a strange expression. They realize he has been drugged. Thinking someone might be in their room examining their belongings, they rush upstairs and find the phony pilot and his phony rescuer. Joe tries to grab the pilot, whose wig comes off. It is the phony Rex Hallbjornsson, who gets away with his partner. Chet and Biff Hooper, who has joined the others in Iceland, go to investigate a man named Hallbjornsson who might know Rex, while Frank and Joe go with a coast guard officer to look for Hallbjornsson at sea. After a devastating storm Frank sees a small raft, possibly with a motor, and thinks it might be the criminals. Over the course of a day or two, they put on disguises and act as phony crewmen for Rex Mar (the real Hallbjornsson, who has changed his name). Musselman, the phony Rex Hallbjornsson, is fooled by their disguises until Joe slips up by speaking English rather than Icelandic. The boys defeat the criminals in hand-to-hand combat and have them arrested. With the help of Biff who was kidnapped, the boys figure out how the remaining bad guys are going to transport the kidnapped astronaut. The kidnappers take over a plane and resist efforts to stop them but the astronaut and Chet, who was also kidnapped, break free and subdue them.
