= Crime in the Kennel =

1995 novel by Franklin W. Dixon

- Author: Franklin W. Dixon
- Language: English
- Series: Hardy Boys
- Genre: Detective, mystery
- Publisher: Aladdin
- Publication date: August 1995
- Publication place: United States
- Media type: Print (paperback)
- Pages: 160 pp (first edition, paperback)
- ISBN: 978-0-671-87217-5 (first edition, paperback)
- OCLC: 32847467

Crime in the Kennel is the 133rd title in the Hardy Boys series of detective/mystery books, written by Franklin W. Dixon.

== Plot summary ==
Iola's dog Spike is kidnapped, and the Hardy Boys set out to find him.
