= Training for Trouble =

2000 Hardy Boys novel

- Language: English
- Series: Hardy Boys
- Genre: Detective, mystery
- Publisher: Wanderer Books
- Publication date: 2000
- Publication place: United States
- Media type: Print (paperback)

Training for Trouble is a Hardy Boys novel. It was first published in 2000.

== Plot summary ==
The Hardy Boys decide to go to a sports facility in Bayport. They see many competing there, but they find out about a mysterious figure creating 'accidents'. Now they must find him before more accidents happen.
