= The Mystery of the Spiral Bridge =

1966 book by Franklin W. Dixon

- Author: Franklin W. Dixon
- Original title: The Mystery of the Spiral Bridge
- Cover artist: Rudy Nappi
- Language: English
- Series: The Hardy Boys
- Genre: Detective, mystery
- Publisher: Grosset & Dunlap
- Publication date: 1966
- Publication place: United States
- Media type: Print (hardback & paperback)
- Pages: 177 pages
- Preceded by: The Haunted Fort
- Followed by: The Secret Agent on Flight 101

The Mystery of the Spiral Bridge is the forty-fifth volume in the original The Hardy Boys series of mystery books for children and teens published by Grosset & Dunlap.

This book was written for the Stratemeyer Syndicate by Andrew E. Svenson in 1966.

== Plot summary ==
The Hardy Boys track down the saboteurs who kidnapped their father, and have to keep them from blowing up a bridge near Boontown, Kentucky. The bridge is being built by Tony Prito's father's construction company. Mr Hardy is ill for most of the story. The villains are mostly ex-crooks who want that area of the bridge for themselves.
