= Hyde and Shriek =

Hardy boys graphic novel

Front cover

Hyde & Shriek is a Hardy Boys graphic novel written by Scott Lobdell and illustrated by Sidney Lima and Paulo Henrique. The sixth in the Undercover Brothers graphic novel series, it was published by Papercutz in 2006.

== Plot summary ==
ATAC assign the Hardy brothers to protect the daughter of a foreign ambassador from assassins. They have their work cut out for them when she attends a horror-themed NYC restaurant full of mechanical scares and frightening special effects.
