= Undercover Brothers =

Detective fiction series of books

- Author: Franklin W. Dixon
- Original title: The Hardy Boys: Undercover Brothers
- Country: United States
- Language: English
- Genre: Detective fiction
- Publisher: Simon & Schuster
- Published: 2005
- Media type: Print

The Hardy Boys: Undercover Brothers is a detective fiction series of books published by Aladdin Paperbacks (an imprint of Simon & Schuster), which replaced The Hardy Boys Digest paperbacks in early 2005. All the books in the series have been written under the pen name of Franklin W. Dixon.

== Series background ==
The Undercover Brothers is about two teenage brother detectives, Frank and Joe Hardy, who are the sons of world-famous PI Fenton Hardy. Although there are many similarities in this series to the previous Hardy Boys series, there are also many changes, for example:

- The Hardy boys are undercover agents for American Teens Against Crime (ATAC), a top-secret government organization, co-founded by their father, and are solving more realistic and violent crimes. Since it is a top-secret organization, Frank and Joe often need to make up excuses to convince their mother and aunt to let them go to places.
- The books in this series are written in a first-person narrative style with Frank and Joe alternating chapters and often interrupting each other.
- The Hardy boys' aunt's name is shortened from Gertrude to Trudy. It is revealed in Hurricane Joe why she shortened her name to Trudy. This version is much younger than the character in other Hardy Boys series.
- The Hardy boys' long-time girlfriends, Callie Shaw and Iola Morton, appear in the books, but only as platonic friends of the boys instead of love interests. Other friends from the original series are occasionally mentioned but never play important roles as they did in the past.
- The Hardys have a pet parrot named Playback.

=== Regular series ===
Titles and publication dates
#	Title	Released
1	Extreme Danger	April 1, 2005
2	Running on Fumes	April 1, 2005
3	Boardwalk Bust	April 1, 2005
4	Thrill Ride	April 1, 2005
5	Rocky Road	July 1, 2005
6	Burned	October 1, 2005
7	Operation: Survival	December 1, 2005
8	Top Ten Ways to Die	February 1, 2006
9	Martial Law	April 1, 2006
10	Blown Away	June 1, 2006
11	Hurricane Joe	August 1, 2006
12	Trouble in Paradise	October 1, 2006
13	The Mummy's Curse	November 28, 2006
14	Hazed	February 6, 2007
15	Death and Diamonds	April 10, 2007
16	Bayport Buccaneers	June 5, 2007
17	Murder at the Mall	July 24, 2007
18	Pushed	September 25, 2007
19	Foul Play	November 27, 2007
20	Feeding Frenzy	January 8, 2008
21	Comic Con Artist	March 25, 2008

=== Trilogy series ===
Titles and publication dates
#	Title	Released	Trilogy
22	Deprivation House	May 20, 2008	The Murder House Trilogy
23	House Arrest	July 8, 2008	The Murder House Trilogy
24	Murder House	September 30, 2008	The Murder House Trilogy
25	Double Trouble	November 25, 2008	Double Danger Trilogy
26	Double Down	December 23, 2008	Double Danger Trilogy
27	Double Deception	March 10, 2009	Double Danger Trilogy
28	Galaxy X	May 19, 2009	Galaxy X Trilogy
29	X-plosion	July 21, 2009	Galaxy X Trilogy
30	The X-Factor	September 8, 2009	Galaxy X Trilogy
31	Killer Mission	November 10, 2009	Killer Mystery Trilogy
32	Private Killer	January 5, 2010	Killer Mystery Trilogy
33	Killer Connections	March 9, 2010	Killer Mystery Trilogy
34	The Children of the Lost	May 4, 2010	Identity Mystery Trilogy
35	Lost Brother	October 12, 2010	Identity Mystery Trilogy
36	Forever Lost	January 4, 2011	Identity Mystery Trilogy
37	Movie Menace	May 10, 2011	The Deathstalker Trilogy
38	Movie Mission	September 13, 2011	The Deathstalker Trilogy
39	Movie Mayhem	January 3, 2012	The Deathstalker Trilogy

=== Undercover Brothers Super Mysteries ===
Titles and publication dates
#	Title	Released
1	Wanted	June 1, 2006
2	Kidnapped at the Casino	May 8, 2007
3	The Haunted	August 5, 2008

== The Hardy Boys Secret Files ==
The Hardy Boys Secret Files is a series begun in 2010 by the publisher Simon & Schuster under their Aladdin imprint. It features the Hardy Boys, Frank and Joe, as grade-school detectives. Three new titles are published yearly as paperback books and eBooks. This series ended in 2015 and was replaced by the Hardy Boys Clue Book series.

1. Trouble at the Arcade
2. The Missing Mitt
3. Mystery Map
4. Hopping Mad
5. A Monster of a Mystery
6. The Bicycle Thief
7. The Disappearing Dog
8. Sports Sabotage
9. The Great Coaster Caper
10. A Rockin' Mystery (October 2012)
11. Robot Rumble (April 2013)
12. Lights, Camera...Zombies! (August 2013)
13. Balloon Blow-Up (December 2013)
14. Fossil Frenzy (April 2014)
15. Ship of Secrets (August 2014)
16. Camping Chaos (December 2014)
17. The Great Escape (April 2015)
18. Medieval Upheaval (August 2015)
19. The Race Is On (December 2015)

Titles, authorship, and publication dates
#	Title	Pub.
1	Trouble at the Arcade	April 27, 2010
2	The Missing Mitt	April 27, 2010
3	Mystery Map	August 17, 2010
4	Hopping Mad	September 14, 2010
5	A Monster of a Mystery	April 5, 2011
6	The Bicycle Thief	August 9, 2011
7	The Disappearing Dog	October 18, 2011
8	Sports Sabotage	April 3, 2012
9	The Great Coaster Caper	August 7, 2012
10	A Rockin' Mystery	October 16, 2012
11	Robot Rumble	April 2, 2013
12	Lights, Camera ... Zombies!	August 6, 2013
13	Balloon Blow-Up	December 3, 2013
14	Fossil Frenzy	April 29, 2014
15	Ship of Secrets	August 5, 2014
16	Camping Chaos	December 2, 2014
17	The Great Escape	April 21, 2015
18	Medieval Upheaval	August 4, 2015
19	The Race Is On	December 1, 2015

=== Nancy Drew and the Hardy Boys Super Mystery ===
A crossover spin-off series with the Nancy Drew: Girl Detective series. The stories are told in the first person, alternating chapters between Frank's or Joe's and Nancy's perspective. The first title in the series acts as an introduction between the characters. This series published one title per year until the end of the Girl Detective and Undercover Brothers series in 2012.

Titles and publication dates
#	Title	Released
1	Terror on Tour	June 5, 2007
2	Danger Overseas	May 6, 2008
3	Club Dread	May 5, 2009
4	Gold Medal Murder	July 6, 2010
5	Bonfire Masquerade	July 12, 2011
6	Stage Fright	July 10, 2012

== Graphic novels ==
In the spring of 2005, NBM launched its new imprint, Papercutz, with the publication of two three-part comic book series; Nancy Drew (The Demon of River Heights) and The Hardy Boys (The Ocean of Osyria). After the completion of both series, The Demon of River Heights series and The Ocean of Osyria series were both collected into 92 pages graphic novels, becoming the first titles in the Nancy Drew graphic novel series and the Hardy Boys graphic novel series respectively.

All other titles in both series have been made in graphic novel format only and are published every three months.

=== List of graphic novels series titles ===
2005
1. The Ocean of Osyria

When Chet Morton's Internet account is hacked into and used to bid on a stolen artifact, the Ocean of Osyria, best friends Frank and Joe Hardy, with girlfriends Callie Shaw and Iola Morton, head to Osyria, the location of the auction, to clear Chet's name.

2. Identity Theft

The brothers investigate a very strange mystery about a popular, wealthy teenage girl's stolen identity.

3. Mad House
4. Malled

The brothers and a few foreign shoppers are locked up in Bayport's new shopping mall deliberately by a mysterious man who sabotaged the mall with many traps. The 'prisoners' must struggle to survive together, find a way to escape, and find and stop the man with a few ATAC gadgets the brothers have before it is too late.

2006
4. Malled
5. Sea You, Sea Me
6. Hyde and Shriek
7. The Opposite Numbers

2007
8. Board to Death

The brothers must figure out who is trying to kill the competition at a skateboard tournament.

9. To Die or Not to Die

The boys head to a drama competition for high school students to snoop out a sabotager wanting to win the tournament.

10. A Hardy Day's Night

The Hardy Boys have to rescue an agent's son or they will be dead!

11. Abracadeath

2008
12. Dude Ranch O' Death!
13. The Deadliest Stunt

The brothers head to a stunt competition to work with Lindsay Rider... as backup!

14. Haley Danelle's Top Eight!

When Haley's Internet friends start disappearing in real life, the boys decide to help out.

15. Live Free, Die Hardy!

2009
16. Shhhhhh!
17. Word Up!
18. D.A.N.G.E.R. Spells the Hangman
19. Chaos at 50,000 feet!

2010
20. Deadly Strategy

== See also ==
- The Hardy Boys
