= A Game Called Chaos =

2000 novel

- Language: English
- Series: Hardy Boys
- Genre: Detective, mystery
- Publisher: Wanderer Books
- Publication date: 2000
- Publication place: United States
- Media type: Print (paperback)

A Game Called Chaos is a Hardy Boys novel. It was first published in 2000.

== Plot ==
Game designer Steven Royal, creator of a game series called CHAOS, suddenly disappears. Frank and Joe Hardy take on the case, running into trouble along the way.
