= Franklin W. Dixon =

House pseudonym used by the Stratemeyer Syndicate

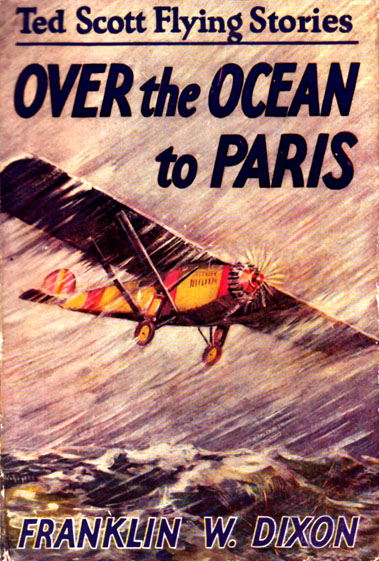

Franklin W. Dixon is the pen name used by a variety of different authors who were part of a team that wrote the Hardy Boys novels for the Stratemeyer Syndicate (now owned by Simon & Schuster). Dixon was also the writer attributed for the Ted Scott Flying Stories series, published by Grosset & Dunlap.

Canadian author Charles Leslie McFarlane is believed to have written the first sixteen Hardy Boys books, but worked to a detailed plot and character outline for each story. The outlines are believed to have originated with Edward Stratemeyer, with later books outlined by his daughters Edna C. Squier and Harriet Adams. Edna and Harriet also edited all books in the series through the mid-1960s. Other writers of the original books include MacFarlane's wife Amy, John Button, Andrew E. Svenson, and Adams herself; most of the outlines were done by Adams and Svenson. A number of other writers and editors were recruited to revise the outlines and update the texts in line with a more modern sensibility, starting in the late 1950s.

The principal author for the Ted Scott books was John W. Duffield.

== Bibliography ==
The following series or books have been published under the name Franklin W. Dixon:

=== The Hardy Boys series ===
- The Hardy Boys Mystery Stories (1927–2005)
- Nancy Drew and the Hardy Boys: Be a Detective Mystery Stories (1984–1985)
- The Hardy Boys Casefiles (1987–1998)
- Hardy Boys and Tom Swift Ultra Thriller (1992–1993)
- The Hardy Boys are: The Clues Brothers (1997–2000)
- The Hardy Boys: Undercover Brothers (2005–2012)
- The Hardy Boys: Undercover Brothers Super Mystery (2006–2007)
- Undercover Brothers Graphic Novels (2005–2010)
- Nancy Drew and the Hardy Boys Super Mystery (with Carolyn Keene) (2007)
- Hardy Boys Clue Book (2016)

=== Other series ===
- Ted Scott Flying Stories (1927–1943)
- Joanna Brady stories by Judith Jance: Joanna's second husband is Franklin W. Dixon, a writer who has to use a pseudonym because his real name has been pre-empted by the house-name for the Hardy Boys authors.

=== Individual books ===
- The Hardy Boys Detective Handbook (1959)
- The Hardy Boys Handbook: Seven Stories of Survival (1980)
- Nancy Drew and the Hardy Boys Super Sleuths (with Carolyn Keene) (1981)
- Nancy Drew and the Hardy Boys Super Sleuths #2 (with Carolyn Keene) (1984)
- Nancy Drew and the Hardy Boys Campfire Stories (with Carolyn Keene) (1984)
- The Hardy Boys Ghost Stories (1984)
- Hardy Boys Adventures (2014)

=== References in other works ===
- In The Jealous Kind by James Lee Burke, the main character, Aaron Holland Broussard, uses the alias Franklin W. Dixon.
