= The Hardy Boys =

Fictional detectives and book series

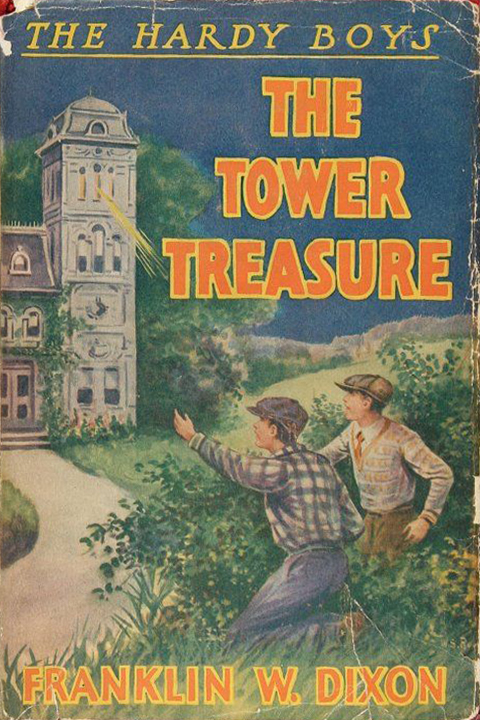
Cover of The Tower Treasure, the first Hardy Boys mystery

The Hardy Boys, brothers Frank and Joe Hardy, are fictional characters who appear in a series of mystery novels for young readers. The series revolves around teenage amateur sleuths, solving cases that often stumped their adult counterparts. The characters were created by American writer Edward Stratemeyer, the founder of book packaging firm Stratemeyer Syndicate. The books were written by several ghostwriters, most notably Leslie McFarlane, under the collective pseudonym Franklin W. Dixon.

The Hardy Boys have evolved since their debut in 1927. From 1959 to 1973, the first 38 books were extensively revised to remove social and ethnic stereotypes, modernize content, and shorten the books.

A new Hardy Boys series, the Hardy Boys Casefiles, was created in 1987, and featured murders, violence, and international espionage. The original "Hardy Boys Mystery Stories" series ended in 2005. A new series, Undercover Brothers, was launched the same year, featuring updated versions of the characters who narrate their adventures in the first person. Undercover Brothers ended in 2012 and was replaced in 2013 by The Hardy Boys Adventures, also narrated in the first person.

Through these changes the characters have remained popular; several new volumes are published each year, and the adventures have been translated into over 25 languages. The boys have been featured in five television shows and several video games, and have helped promote merchandise such as lunchboxes and jeans. Critics have many explanations for the characters' longevity, suggesting that the Hardy Boys embody wish fulfillment, American ideals of boyhood and masculinity, a well-respected father paradoxically argued to be inept in the later books, and the possibility of the triumph of good over evil.

On January 1, 2023, the original editions of the first three books entered the public domain in the United States. As of 2026, the first nine books are in the public domain, with The Great Airport Mystery being the most recent volume to enter the public domain. Volume 40 and the revised text of volume 14 are also in the public domain, due to failure to renew the original copyrights. Under current copyright laws, the revised editions will not be in the public domain in the United States until 2054.

== Premise ==
The Hardy Boys, Frank and Joe Hardy, are fictional teenage brothers and amateur detectives. Frank is eighteen (sixteen in earlier versions), and Joe is seventeen (fifteen in earlier versions). They live in the city of Bayport on Barmet Bay with their father, detective Fenton Hardy; their mother, Laura Hardy; (Note: In The Mystery of the Flying Express, Mrs. Hardy's first name is given as Mildred.) and their Aunt Gertrude. The brothers attend high school in Bayport, where they are in the same grade, (Note: Frank was ill one year and kept out of school for a term, according to volume nine, The Great Airport Mystery.) but school is rarely mentioned in the books and never hinders their solving of mysteries. In the older stories, the Boys' mysteries are often linked to their father's confidential cases. He sometimes requests their assistance, while at other times they stumble upon relevant villains and incidents. In the Undercover Brothers series (2005–2012), the Hardys are members of and receive cases from American Teens Against Crime. The Hardy Boys are sometimes assisted in solving mysteries by their friends Chet Morton, Phil Cohen, Biff Hooper, Jerry Gilroy, and Tony Prito; and, less frequently, by their platonic girlfriends Callie Shaw and Iola Morton (Chet's sister).

In each novel, the Hardy Boys are constantly involved in adventure and action. Despite the frequent danger, the boys "never lose their nerve ... They are hardy boys, luckier and more clever than anyone around them." They live in an atmosphere of mystery and intrigue: "Never were so many assorted felonies committed in a simple American small town. Murder, drug peddling, race-horse kidnapping, diamond smuggling, bank robbing, kidnapping, dynamiting, burglaries, medical malpractice, big-time auto theft, even (in the 1940s) the hijacking of strategic materials and espionage, all were conducted with Bayport as a nucleus." With so much in common, the boys are so little differentiated that one commentator facetiously describes them thus: "The boys' characters basically broke down this way – Frank had dark hair; Joe was blond." In general, however, "Frank was the thinker while Joe was more impulsive, and perhaps a little more athletic." The two boys are invariably on good terms with each other and never engage in sibling rivalry, except in the Undercover Brothers series.

Frank and Joe are somewhat wealthy and often travel to far-away locations, including Mexico in The Mark on the Door (1934), Scotland in The Secret Agent on Flight 101 (1967), Iceland in The Arctic Patrol Mystery (1969), Australia in The Firebird Rocket (1978), Egypt in The Mummy Case (1980), and Kenya in The Mystery of the Black Rhino (2003). The Hardys also travel across the United States by motorcycle, motorboat, iceboat, train, airplane, and their own car.

== Creation of characters ==
The characters were conceived in 1926 by Edward Stratemeyer, founder of book-packaging firm Stratemeyer Syndicate. Stratemeyer pitched the series to publishers Grosset & Dunlap and suggested that the boys be called the Keene Boys, the Scott Boys, the Hart Boys, or the Bixby Boys. Grosset & Dunlap editors approved the project, but, for reasons unknown, chose the name "The Hardy Boys". The first three titles were published in 1927 and were an immediate success: by mid-1929, more than 115,000 books had been sold. The series was so successful that Stratemeyer created Nancy Drew as a female counterpart to the Hardys.

=== Ghostwriters ===
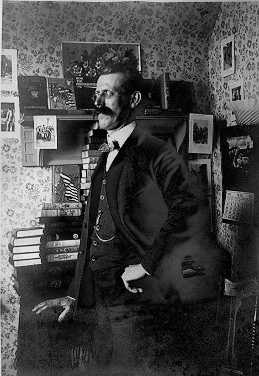
Edward Stratemeyer, creator of the Hardy Boys and founder of the Stratemeyer Syndicate

Each volume is penned by a ghostwriter under the pseudonym Franklin W. Dixon. In accordance with the customs of Stratemeyer Syndicate series production, ghostwriters for the Syndicate signed contracts that have sometimes been interpreted as requiring authors to sign away all rights to authorship or future royalties. The contracts stated that authors could not use their Stratemeyer Syndicate pseudonyms independently of the Syndicate. In the early days of the Syndicate, ghostwriters were paid a fee of $125, "roughly equivalent to two months' wages for a typical newspaper reporter, the primary day job of the syndicate ghosts." During the Great Depression this fee was lowered, first to $100 and later to $75. All royalties went to the Syndicate, all correspondence with the publisher was handled through a Stratemeyer Syndicate office, and the Syndicate enlisted the cooperation of libraries in hiding the ghostwriters' names.

The Syndicate's process for creating the Hardy Boys books consisted of creating a detailed outline with all plot elements, drafting a manuscript, and editing the manuscript. Edward Stratemeyer's daughter, Edna Stratemeyer Squier, and possibly Stratemeyer himself, wrote outlines for the first volumes in the series. Beginning in 1934, Stratemeyer's other daughter, Harriet Stratemeyer Adams, began contributing plot outlines; she and Andrew Svenson wrote most plot outlines for the next several decades. Other plot outliners included Vincent Buranelli, James Duncan Lawrence, and Tom Mulvey.

Most early volumes were written by Canadian Leslie McFarlane, who authored nineteen of the first twenty-five titles and co-authored volume 17 The Secret Warning, between 1927 and 1946. Unlike many other Syndicate ghostwriters, McFarlane was regarded highly enough by the Syndicate that he was frequently given advances of $25 or $50, and during the Depression, when fees were lowered, he was paid $85 for each Hardy Boys book when other Syndicate ghostwriters were receiving only $75 for their productions. According to McFarlane's family, he despised the series and its characters.

After co-authoring Volume 17, John Button, with Volume 18, The Twisted Claw (1939), took over the series full-time until 1942; McFarlane resumed with Volume 22, The Flickering Torch Mystery (1943). McFarlane's last contribution was Volume 24, The Short-Wave Mystery (1945); his wife, Amy, authored Volume 26, The Phantom Freighter (1947). (Note: There is some dispute over this, as Leslie McFarlane claimed authorship of the title in his autobiography. However, Stratemeyer Syndicate records list only Amy McFarlane as the author of the volume (Keeline).) Over the next several decades, other volumes were written by Adams, Svenson, Lawrence, Buranelli, William Dougherty, and James Buechler. Beginning in 1959, the series was extensively revised and re-written. Many authors worked on the revised books, writing new manuscripts; some of them also wrote plot outlines and edited the books. Among the authors who worked on the revised versions were Adams, Svenson, Buechler, Lilo Wuenn, Anne Shultes, Alistair Hunter, Tom Mulvey, Patricia Doll, and Priscilla Baker-Carr.

In 1979, the Hardy Boys books began to be published in paperback rather than hardcover. Lawrence and Buranelli continued to write titles; other authors included Karl Harr III and Laurence Swinburne. In 1984, the rights to the series were sold, along with the Stratemeyer Syndicate, to Simon & Schuster. New York book packager Mega-Books subsequently hired authors to write the Hardy Boys Mystery Stories and a new series, the Hardy Boys Casefiles.

=== Legal disputes ===
In 1980, dissatisfied with the lack of creative control at Grosset & Dunlap and the lack of publicity for the Hardy Boys' 50th anniversary in 1977, Harriet Adams (née Stratemeyer) switched publishers for the Hardy Boys and Nancy Drew, as well as other series, to Simon & Schuster. Grosset & Dunlap filed suit against the Syndicate and Simon & Schuster, citing "breach of contract, copyright infringement, and unfair competition" and requesting $300 million in damages.

The outcome of the case turned largely on the question of who had written the Nancy Drew series. Adams filed a countersuit, claiming that, as author of the Nancy Drew Mystery Stories, she retained the rights to her work. Although Adams wrote many Nancy Drew titles after 1953 and edited others, she claimed to have authored all the early titles. In fact, she had rewritten the older titles but was not the original author. When Mildred Benson, the author of the early Nancy Drew volumes, testified about her work for the Syndicate, Benson's role in writing the manuscripts of early titles was revealed in court with extensive documentation, contradicting Adams' claims to authorship. The court ruled that Grosset had the rights to publish the original series of both Nancy Drew and the Hardy Boys as they were in print in 1980, but did not own characters or trademarks. Furthermore, any new publishers chosen by Adams were within their rights to print new titles.

== Evolution of characters ==
The Hardy Boys have gone through many permutations over the years. Beginning in 1959, the books were extensively revised, and some commentators find that the Hardys' characters changed in the process. Commentators also sometimes see differences between the Hardy Boys of the original Hardy Boys Mystery Stories and the Hardy Boys of the Hardy Boys Casefiles or the Undercover Brothers series.

=== 1927–1959 ===
The early volumes, largely written by Leslie McFarlane, have been praised for their atmosphere and writing style, qualities often considered lacking in juvenile series books. McFarlane's writing is clear and filled with specific details, making his works superior to many other Stratemeyer series titles. Such, at least, was McFarlane's intention: "It seemed to me the Hardy Boys deserved something better than the slapdash treatment Dave Fearless (Note: "Dave Fearless" was the hero of another, earlier Stratemeyer Syndicate series, published under the name Roy Rockwood.) had been getting... I opted for Quality." The volumes not written by McFarlane or his wife were penned by John Button, who wrote the series from 1938 to 1942; this period is sometimes referred to as the "Weird Period" as the writing is full of inconsistencies and the Hardy Boys' adventures involve futuristic gadgetry and exotic locations.

"Of course, chief," said Frank smoothly, "if you're afraid to go up to the Polucca place just because it's supposed to be haunted, don't bother. We can tell the newspapers that we believe our father has met with foul play and that you won't bother to look into the matter, but don't let us disturb you at all–"

"What's that about the newspapers?" demanded the chief, getting up from his chair so suddenly that he upset the checkerboard.... "Don't let this get into the papers." The chief was constantly afraid of publicity unless it was of the most favorable nature.

— The House on the Cliff, 1927

In general, the world of these early volumes is a "[dark] and ... divided place." In these early titles, the boys are cynical about human nature, an attitude apparently justified when the police, whom they have repeatedly helped, throw them into jail on slim evidence in The Great Airport Mystery (1930). The police and authority figures, in general, come off poorly in these books, so much so that at one point Edward Stratemeyer wrote to McFarlane in order to reprimand him for a "grievous lack of respect for officers of the law." The Hardys are less affluent than earlier Stratemeyer characters; they eagerly accept cash rewards largely to finance college educations, and, with their parents, strive to please their Aunt Gertrude, because she possesses a small fortune. The rich are portrayed as greedy and selfish. This view of the world reflects McFarlane's relative "lack [of] sympathy with the American power structure." In his autobiography, McFarlane described his rationale for writing the books this way, writing: "I had my own thoughts about teaching youngsters that obedience to authority is somehow sacred.... Would civilization crumble if kids got the notion that the people who ran the world were sometimes stupid, occasionally wrong, and even corrupt at times?"

It has been a matter of disagreement regarding the treatment of minorities in the books. The early volumes have been called models of diversity for their day, since among the Hardys' friends are Phil Cohen, who is Jewish, and the Italian immigrant Tony Prito. These two friends are rarely involved in the Hardys' adventures, however. That level of friendship is reserved for Biff Hooper and Chet Morton. The books have been extensively criticized for their use of racial and ethnic stereotypes (Note: See, for example, Morris 1997, who rather intemperately calls them "hideously and uncompromisingly racist.") and their xenophobia. Vilnoff, for example, the villain in The Sinister Sign-Post (1936), is described as "swarthy" and "a foreigner", notes critic Steve Burgess.

We sense his untrustworthy nature immediately when he sits down beside the boys at a football game and doesn't understand it, despite the boys' best efforts to explain. When he does grasp something, you know it. "I onnerstand pairfectly," he says. Later he adds genially, "I haf you vhere I vant you now!" Can't quite place the accent? It's foreign. Twenty-five chapters are not enough to solve the mystery of his nationality.

African Americans are the targets of much racism, being depicted as unintelligent, lazy, and superstitious, "bumpkin rescuers" at best and "secretive and conspiratorial villains" at worst. Benjamin Lefebvre notes that Harriet Adams at times rebuked Leslie McFarlane for not sufficiently following her instructions regarding the portrayal of African-American characters; he writes that it is not clear "whether Adams rewrote parts of McFarlane's manuscripts to add [racist] details or to what extent these early texts would now be considered even more notoriously racist had McFarlane followed Adams's instructions more carefully." In Footprints Under the Window (1933), (Note: There is some disagreement as to whether this title was penned by McFarlane. See Keeline 2003.) Chinese-American men are portrayed as effeminate threats both to national security and white heteromasculinity. Native Americans received mixed treatment; those living within the continental United States are portrayed as members of once-noble tribes whose greatness has been diminished by the coming of white men, while those living outside the continental U.S. are "portrayed as uneducated, easily manipulated, or semi-savage." However, Hispanics are generally treated as equals; Mexico's history and culture are treated with respect and admiration.

=== 1959–1979 ===
The Hardy Boys volumes were extensively revised beginning in 1959 at the insistence of publishers Grosset & Dunlap, and against the wishes of Harriet Adams. The revision project, which also encompassed the Nancy Drew Mystery Stories, was sparked largely by letters that parents had been writing to Grosset & Dunlap since at least 1948, complaining about the prevalence of racial stereotypes in the books. Volume 14 in the Hardy Boys series, The Hidden Harbor Mystery (1935), was singled out for particular and repeated attention for its portrayal of a black criminal who organizes a gang of black boys and treats whites disrespectfully. (Note: For an extended analysis of the original and revised versions of this title, see Wasylyshyn 1982.) As one parent put it, the books were "ingraining the old race-riot type of fear." As such letters became more frequent, Grosset & Dunlap informed the Stratemeyer Syndicate that the books must be revised and such stereotypes excised. The result, however, was less the removal of stereotypes than the removal of non-white characters altogether and the creation of an "ethnically cleansed Bayport." By the 1970s, however, the series began to re-introduce black characters.

An additional rationale for the revisions was a drop in sales, which became particularly significant by the mid-1960s. Accordingly, the revisions focused on streamlining the texts, as well as eliminating stereotypes. The books were shortened from 25 chapters to 20 and the writing style was made terser. Difficult words such as "ostensible" and "presaged" were eliminated, as was slang. As a result of the new, more streamlined writing style, the books focus more on non-stop action than on building atmosphere, and "prolonged suspense [is] evaporated." The books were also aimed at an increasingly younger audience with shorter attention spans. For this reason, many commentators find the new versions nothing less than "eviscerated", foremost among them being the first Hardy Boys ghostwriter, Leslie McFarlane, who agreed with a reporter's statement that the books had been "gutted."

"Great, Dad!" Frank said, jumping to his feet. "With spring vacation coming up we won't miss any time at school!"

"Are your passports up to date?" his father asked.

"Sure, we always keep them that way."

— The Arctic Patrol Mystery, 1969

In the course of revising and modernizing the series, many plots were completely re-written. The Flickering Torch Mystery (1943), for example, was changed from a plot involving an actual flickering torch used as a signal by a gang to a plot featuring a rock club called "The Flickering Torch." When plots were kept, their more lurid elements were eliminated; Vilnoff, the villain in The Sinister Sign-Post, was changed from a criminal who compulsively sculpts miniature models of his own hands to a car thief without such eccentricities, and another villain, Pedro Vincenzo, who branded his victims no longer does so in the revised version of The Mark on the Door (1934, rev. 1967).

The books became more respectful of law and authority. Even villains no longer smoked or drank, and scenes involving guns and shoot-outs were compressed or eliminated, in favor of criminals simply giving themselves up. The boys, too, become more respectful of rules and of the law; for example, they no longer drive faster than the speed limit even in pursuit of a villain. The Hardys also became more and more wealthy, prompting the criticism that the "major problem in [these volumes] is that the Hardy Boys have risen above any ability to identify with people like the typical boys who read their books. They are members and agents of the adult ruling class, acting on behalf of that ruling class."

=== 1979–2005 ===
"A secret door!" Joe said.

"We haven't seen one of these in, oh, several months," Frank said.

— Casefiles No. 65, No Mercy, 1992

The Hardy Boys began to be published in paperback in 1979. The Hardys were also featured in two new series, the Hardy Boys Casefiles and the Clues Brothers. The latter series, modeled on the Nancy Drew Notebooks, was aimed at a younger audience, and ran from 1997 to 2000. In contrast, the Casefiles, begun a decade earlier in 1987, was aimed at an older audience than the Hardy Boys Mystery Stories. In the new series, the Hardys work with a secret government organization simply called the "Network", with which they collaborate to "infiltrate organized crime, battle terrorists and track down assassins around the world." The Hardys' personalities are portrayed as more separate and distinct, and they sometimes fight; in the first of the series, Dead on Target, for example, the brothers brawl after Frank tries to restrain Joe after Joe's girlfriend, Iola Morton, is killed by a car bomb. In general, the series is more violent, and the Hardy Boys carry various guns; lines like "Joe! Hand me the Uzi!" are not out of character. Barbara Steiner, a Casefiles ghostwriter, describes a sample plot outline: "I was told that Joe Hardy would get involved with a waitress, a black widow kind of character, and that Joe would get arrested for murder. I was told the emphasis was on high action and suspense and there had to be a cliff-hanger ending to every chapter." (Note: Dumas 1991, 10M. The book in question is Casefiles No. 20, Witness to Murder.)

=== 2005 ===
The long-running Hardy Boys Mystery Stories series ended in 2005 and was replaced with a reboot series, The Hardy Boys: Undercover Brothers. In these volumes, the Hardys' adventures are narrated in the first person, each brother alternating chapters. This fresh approach to telling the adventures reveals two boys quite foreign to how they have been portrayed before, egotistical and jealous, and longtime readers will find few connections with the boys' previous personalities. The boys' Aunt Gertrude becomes "Trudy", their mother Laura is given a career as a librarian, and their father is semi-retired. The boys are given their cases by a secret group known as ATAC, an acronym for American Teens Against Crime. In this new series, the Hardy Boys seem "more like regular kids – who have lots of wild adventures – in these books, which also deal with issues that kids today might have thought about. For example, the second book in the series, Running on Fumes, deals with environmentalists who go a little too far to try to save trees." The Hardys are also featured in a new graphic novel series, begun in 2005 and produced by Papercutz, and a new early chapter book series called The Hardy Boys: Secret Files, begun in 2010 by the publisher Simon & Schuster under their Aladdin imprint. The last Undercover Brothers books were released in January 2012 (main series) and July 2012 (Nancy Drew/Hardy Boys Super Mystery '07 series). At the time of cancellation, there was one book that had been announced, but was ultimately shelved (The Case Of The MyFace Kidnapper); it is unknown whether this was going to be the final title of this unpublished book, since many bookstore websites and Simon & Schuster's website always had the letters "W.T." behind the title, meaning that it was a "working title".

February 2013 saw the launch of The Hardy Boys Adventures, a series written in the first person. For the first time since 1985, the books are issued in hardcover, along with paperback editions.

== Books ==
The longest-running series of books to feature the Hardy Boys is the Hardy Boys Mystery Stories, sometimes also called the Hardy Boys Mysteries. The series ran from 1927 to 2005 and comprises 190 volumes, although some consider only the first 58 volumes of this series to be part of the Hardy Boys "canon." The Hardy Boys also appeared in 127 volumes of the Casefiles series and 39 volumes of the Undercover Brothers series, and are currently the heroes of the Hardy Boys Adventures series. The brothers were also featured in a few standalone books, such as The Hardy Boys Ghost Stories, and some crossover titles where they teamed up with other characters such as Nancy Drew or Tom Swift.

=== International publications ===
Hardy Boys books have been extensively reprinted in the United Kingdom, with new illustrations and cover art. The Hardys' adventures have also been translated into over twenty-five languages, including Afrikaans, Norwegian, Swedish, Spanish, Icelandic, Hebrew, French, German, Japanese, Russian, Malay, and Italian. The books are widely read in India, and Japan's Kyoto Sangyo University listed twenty-one Hardy Boys books on its reading list for freshmen in the 1990s.

== In other media ==
=== Television ===
There have been six separate Hardy Boys television adaptations.

In the late 1950s, Disney contracted with the Stratemeyer Syndicate and Grosset & Dunlap to produce two Hardy Boys TV serials, starring Tim Considine and Tommy Kirk. The first of the serials, The Mystery of the Applegate Treasure, was aired on The Mickey Mouse Club in 1956 during the show's second season. To appeal to the show's audience, the Hardy Boys were portrayed as younger than in the books, seeming to be 12 or 13 years old (Considine was 15 and Kirk was 14 during filming). The script, written by Jackson Gillis, was based on the first Hardy Boys book, The Tower Treasure, and the serial was aired in 19 episodes of 15 minutes each with production costs of $5,700. A second serial, The Mystery of Ghost Farm, followed in 1957, with an original story by Jackson Gillis. However, for unknown reasons, no more serials were produced.

In the mid-1960s, sales of Hardy Boys books began to drop. The Stratemeyer Syndicate conducted a survey, which revealed that the decline in sales was due to the perceived high cost of the books and to competition from television. As a result, the Syndicate approved an hour-long pilot for a new Hardy Boys television show. The pilot, based on The Mystery of the Chinese Junk, was aired on the National Broadcasting Company (NBC) on September 8, 1967, and starred Tim Matthieson (later Matheson) as Joe Hardy and Rick Gates as Frank. Both actors were 20 at the time of production and portrayed the Hardy Boys as young adults rather than children. The show did poorly, however, and the series was abandoned.

Two years later, in 1969, the American Broadcasting Company aired a Saturday morning cartoon series based on the Hardy Boys; the series was produced by Filmation and ran from 1969 to 1971. In this series, the Hardys were members of a rock and roll band. A group of professional musicians performed the songs on the series and toured across the United States. The animated series produced two bubblegum music albums "of moderate quality with no commercial success." The series was notable for being the first cartoon to include a black character. (Note: Connelly 2008, p. 208. The introduction of Pete Jones in the series predates the introduction of Valerie Brown from Josie and the Pussycats, who is often credited as the first African American animated character; the Hardy Boys first aired in 1969, while Josie and the Pussycats aired a year later.) The show took note of current concerns; although aimed at a young audience, some plot lines dealt with illegal drugs, and the animated Frank and Joe spoke directly to children about not smoking and the importance of wearing seat belts.

ABC aired another series featuring the Hardy Boys, The Hardy Boys/Nancy Drew Mysteries, from 1977 to 1979. The prime-time series starred Parker Stevenson and Shaun Cassidy as Frank and Joe Hardy; Pamela Sue Martin and later Janet Louise Johnson played Nancy Drew. During the first season, the series alternated between episodes featuring the Hardy Boys one week and Nancy Drew the next. The Hardy Boys were cast as young adults (Stevenson and Cassidy were 24 and 18, respectively, during the filming of the first episodes). The series featured original plots and ones based on Hardy Boys books, among them The Clue of the Screeching Owl, The Disappearing Floor and The Flickering Torch Mystery. The series received an Emmy nomination and featured a number of guest stars, including Kim Cattrall, Ray Milland, Howard Duff, and Ricky Nelson. During the second season, the series format changed to focus more on the Hardy Boys, Nancy Drew appearing mostly in crossover episodes with the brothers. Midway through production of the second season, Martin quit and was replaced by Johnson. The series returned for a third season, dropping the Nancy Drew character completely and shortening its title to The Hardy Boys.

In 1995, another TV adaptation, simply called The Hardy Boys, was produced by Canadian company Nelvana (normally an animation firm), syndicated by New Line Television, and dubbed in French for airing in Quebec and France as well as in the United States. Colin Gray starred as Frank Hardy and Paul Popowich played Joe. The characters were portrayed as in their early 20s, with Frank working as a reporter and Joe still in college. The show lasted for one season of 13 episodes due to poor ratings; a series based on Nancy Drew that ran alongside it in syndication suffered the same fate.

The Hardy Boys streaming series is a teen and young adult-oriented drama starring Rohan Campbell as Frank and Alexander Elliot as Joe released on December 4, 2020, by Hulu with Joan Lambur and Steve Cochrane executive producing the series and Jason Stone directing. Shot in Toronto, Hamilton, and other Southern Ontario locations, the 13 episodes were released on Hulu on December 4, 2020, in the United States and aired on YTV in Canada in 2021. Season 2 premiered in 2022. eventually, in July 2023 a third season was aired.

=== Video games ===
The Hardy Boys have appeared in several titles in the Nancy Drew computer game series produced by Her Interactive. Her Interactive partnered with Sega to release its own series of Hardy Boys games. The first game in the series is titled "Treasure on the Tracks" and was released in 2009 for Nintendo DS.

A separate series of PC games, developed by JoWood Productions and DreamCatcher Games, began in 2008 with The Hidden Theft. Jesse McCartney and Cody Linley are the voices of Frank and Joe. This was followed in 2009 by The Perfect Crime.

=== Comic book ===
In 1970 and 1972, Gold Key Comics put out four comic-book issues tied to the 1969/71 television series.

In March 2017, Dynamite Entertainment released Anthony Del Col’s reboot of classic characters Nancy Drew and the Hardy Boys with Nancy Drew & The Hardy Boys: The Big Lie. Del Col has been a lifelong fan of the characters and was successful in working with Simon & Schuster to secure the comic book rights and then pitch to publishers.

Inspired by Archie Comics’ Afterlife with Archie, Del Col said, "So, then I started to think, 'Huh, I wonder what other characters are out there that are well-known that could be rebooted like that.' That's when I started to look around and I looked in some properties, and then I thought, 'Wait a minute. Nancy Drew. Hardy Boys. Oh, that would be really cool to do a hard-boiled noir take on them.'"

The series, a hardboiled noir take on the characters, finds characters Frank and Joe Hardy accused of murdering their father, Fenton Hardy, and turning to a femme fatale-esque Nancy Drew to clear their names. The series features artwork by Italian artist Werther Dell’Ederra with covers by UK artist Fay Dalton. Del Col credits editors Matt Idelson and Matt Humphreys with helping him shape the direction of the series.

The series debuted to positive reviews. Comics blog Readingwithaflightring.com declared it “the best 'modern' approach to updating a franchise like this that I’ve seen. It works on every level and still fully embraces the heart of who they are." Aintitcool.com reviewer Lyz Reblin stated, “The strength of the series thus far is Ms. Drew, who was absent for most of the first issue. She is a pitch-perfect modernized femme fatale, who could hold her own up against any present-day Sam Spade, Philip Marlowe, or the like.”

=== Merchandise ===
- The Hardy Boys have been used to sell a variety of merchandise over the years, much of it tied to television adaptations. They have appeared in several board games, comic books, coloring books, activity books, jigsaw puzzles, and lunch boxes; two LP albums, Here Come the Hardy Boys and Wheels; a Viewmaster set, a toy truck, charm bracelets, rings, wristwatches, greeting cards, jeans, and guitars.

=== Parodies ===
- The Hardy Boys have been parodied in the animated series South Park in an episode titled "Mystery of the Urinal Deuce", in which the "Hardly Boys" investigate a 9/11 conspiracy theory and excitedly tell each other when they experience a "raging clue".
- The titular characters of the animated series The Venture Bros. are parodies of the Hardy Boys.
- The Hardy Boys Mystery of the Spiral Bridge appears in the NCIS: New Orleans episode "In The Blood", as a book that belonged to Agent Dwayne Pride in the past.
- There have been three Hardy Boys games. The Hardy Boys Treasure Game by Parker Brothers is from 1957. The Hardy Boys Game, by Milton Bradley in 1969, is based on the cartoon. In 1978, Parker Brothers released The Hardy Boys Mystery Game, based on the television series. In the board game, two to four players take on the role of amateur sleuths and try to solve a mystery.
- 2019 video game Disco Elysium features a group of characters known as the "Hardie Boys" led by Titus Hardie that act as minor antagonists. The Hardie Boys are not investigators but a group of union-backed dockworkers who act as vigilantes and claim to have murdered another during the course of the game.

== Thematic analysis ==
The Hardy Boys have been called "a cultural touchstone all over the world." Their adventures have been continuously in print since 1927. The series was an instant success: by mid-1929 over 115,000 books had been sold. As of 2008, the series remained successful, with the first Hardy Boys book, The Tower Treasure, selling over 100,000 copies a year. Worldwide, over 70 million copies of Hardy Books have been sold. A number of critics have tried to explain the reasons for the characters' longevity.

One explanation for this continuing popularity is that the Hardy Boys are simple wish fulfillment. Their adventures allow readers to vicariously experience an escape from the mundane. At the same time, Frank and Joe live ordinary lives when not solving mysteries, allowing readers to identify with characters who seem realistic and whose parents and authority figures are unfailingly supportive and loving. The Hardy Boys also embody an ideal of masculinity: by their very name they "set the stage for a gentrified version of hardiness and constructed hardiness as an ideal for modern American males," part of the "cultural production of self-control and mastery as the revered ideal for the American man." More controversially, to Meredith Wood, the characters embody not just an ideal of masculinity, but an ideal of white masculinity. She argues that "racist stereotypes are ... fundamental to the success of the Hardy Boys series." In support of this claim, Wood cites what she says is the replacement of one stereotype (evil Chinese) with another (evil Latin Americans) in the original and revised versions of Footprints Under the Window. She further claims that this is the reason for the popularity of the Applewood Books reprints of the original, unrevised texts rather than the widely cited blandness of the rewrites.

Critic Gary Westfahl considers the Hardy Boys to not display any sexuality. The Hardys' ignorance of sex and their increasing respect for the law have led to some negative perceptions and many parodies of the characters. They are "well-scrubbed Boy Scout types" who "fetishized squareness." They have been parodied numerous times, in such works as The Hardy Boys and the Mystery of Where Babies Come From by Christopher Durang, The Secret of the Old Queen: A Hardy Boys Musical by Timothy Cope and Paul Boesing, and Mabel Maney's novel A Ghost in the Closet: A Hardly Boys Mystery. National Lampoon ran an article in 1985 entitled "The Undiscovered Notebooks of Franklin W. Dixon", in which the authors "purport to have stumbled upon some unpublished Hardy Boys manuscripts", including "The Party Boys and the Case of the Missing Scotch" and "The Hardly Boys in the Dark Secret of the Spooky Closet."

Others have pointed to the Hardy Boys' relationship with their father as a key to the success of the series. As Tim Morris notes, while Fenton Hardy is portrayed as a great detective, his sons usually solve the cases, making Fenton Hardy a paradoxical figure:

He is always there, he knows everything. He is infallible but always failing. When the boys rescue him, he is typically emaciated, dehydrated, semi-conscious, delirious; they must succor him with candy bars and water. He can take on any shape but reveals his identity within moments of doing so. He never discusses a case except for the one he's working on in a given novel, so that his legendary close-mouthedness turns to garrulousness when a Hardy Boys novel begins, which is of course the only time we ever get to see him. All the same, he only discusses the case in enough detail to mislead his sons and put them in mortal danger. He has systems of information and data-gathering that put the FBI to shame, yet he is always losing his case notes, his ciphers, his microfilm, or some other valuable clue, usually by leaving it in his extra pair of pants, meaning that the Boys have to drive to Canada or Florida or somewhere to retrieve it. I suppose he isn't mysterious at all; he simply embodies what many think of their own fathers: utterly powerful, contemptibly inept.

As a result, the Hardy Boys are able both to be superior to their father and to gain the satisfaction of "fearlessly making their dad proud of them."

In the end, many commentators find that the Hardy Boys are largely successful because their adventures represent "a victory over anxiety." (Note: Connelly 2008, p. 14. See also Billman 1986, p. 96 for similar sentiments.) The Hardy Boys series teaches readers that "although the world can be an out-of-control place, good can triumph over evil, that the worst problems can be solved if we each do our share and our best to help others."

== See also ==
- Nancy Drew
- Trixie Belden
- The Bobbsey Twins
- The Happy Hollisters
- The Hardly Boys
- Three Investigators

== General and cited references ==
- Billman, Carol (1986). The Secret of the Stratemeyer Syndicate. New York: Ungar. ISBN 0-8044-2055-6.
- Burgess, Steve (October 7, 1999). "Perky fellows in a gay-looking speedwagon: The Hardy Boys return". Salon. Archived from the original on October 25, 2008.
- Connelly, Mark (2008). The Hardy Boys Mysteries, 1927–1979: A Cultural and Literary History. Jefferson, North Carolina: McFarland Publishing. ISBN 978-0-7864-3386-5.
- Cross, Gary S (2004). The Cute and the Cool: Wondrous Innocence and Modern American Children's Culture. Oxford: Oxford University Press. ISBN 0-19-515666-8.
- Dixon, Franklin W. (1969). The Arctic Patrol Mystery. New York: Grosset & Dunlap. ISBN 0-448-08948-3.
- Dixon, Franklin W. (1927). The House on the Cliff. New York: Grosset & Dunlap.
- Dixon, Franklin W. (1992). No Mercy. New York: Archway Paperbacks. ISBN 0-671-73101-7.
- Dumas, Alan (August 25, 1991). "Grandma's Adventures with the Hardy Boys". Rocky Mountain News. p. 10M.
- Forman-Brunell, Miriam (2001). Girlhood in America: an encyclopedia. Oxford: ABC-CLIO. ISBN 1-57607-206-1.
- Frey, Christine (August 5, 2004). "Nancy Drew recruits Hardy Boys: Teen Sleuths Will Team Up in New Computer Game". Seattle Post-Intelligencer.
- Grant, Tracy (July 20, 2005). "Extreme Danger (Book 1 of Hardy Boys Undercover Brothers series) [review]". The Washington Post. p. C16.
- Goldmark, Daniel; Taylor, Yuval (2002). The Cartoon Music Book. Chicago: The Chicago Review Press. ISBN 1-55652-473-0.
- Greenwald, Marilyn S (2004). The Secret of the Hardy Boys. Athens: Ohio University Press. ISBN 0-8214-1547-6.
- "Games: The Hardy Boys: Treasure on the Tracks". Her Interactive. 2006. Archived from the original on January 18, 2009.
- "Hardy Boys Online: Setting". 2011.
- Iverson, Dan (October 12, 2006). "South Park: "Mystery of the Urinal Deuce" Review". IGN.
- Johnson, Deirdre (1993). Edward Stratemeyer and the Stratemeyer Syndicate. New York: Twayne. ISBN 0-8057-4006-6.
- "JoWooD and DreamCatcher Sign Jesse McCartney and Cody Linley for Hardy Boys Game". Wireless News. May 16, 2008.
- Keeline, James D (2008). "The Nancy Drew Mythtery Stories". In Cornelius, Michael G; Gregg, Melanie E (eds.). Nancy Drew and Her Sister Sleuths: Essays on the Fiction of Girl Detectives. Nancy Drew and Her Sister Sleuths. Jefferson, North Carolina: McFarland & Company. ISBN 978-0-7864-3995-9.
- Keeline, James D (2003). "Who Wrote the Hardy Boys? Secrets from the Syndicate Files Revealed" (PDF). Archived from the original (PDF) on November 4, 2019.
- Kirkpatrick, David D (July 29, 2001). "In Latest Hardy Boys Case, A Search for New Readers". The New York Times.
- Kismaric, Carole; Heiferman, Marvin (2007). The Mysterious Case of Nancy Drew and the Hardy Boys. New York: Fireside. ISBN 978-1-4165-4945-1.
- Lefebvre, Benjamin (2006). "The 'Hardy Brats' and Their Foolhardy Creator". Children's Literature. 34: 239–245. doi:10.1353/chl.2006.0014. S2CID 144430899.
- McFarlane, Leslie (1976). Ghost of the Hardy Boys: An Autobiography. London: Methuen Press. ISBN 0-8467-0157-X.
- McQuay, David (August 16, 1987). "The Hardy Boys Grow Up – Have Joe and Frank been watching too much 'Miami Vice'?". The San Francisco Chronicle. p. 5.
- Morris, Tim (Winter 1997). "Returning to the Hardy Boys". Raritan: A Quarterly Review. 16 (3): 123–142. ISSN 0275-1607.
- Plunkett-Powell, Karen (1993). The Nancy Drew Scrapbook: 60 years of America's favorite teenage sleuth. New York: St. Martin's Press. ISBN 0-312-09881-2.
- Prager, Arthur (1971). Rascals at Large, or, The Clue in the Old Nostalgia. New York: Doubleday. ISBN 978-9997486073.
- Rehak, Melanie (2006). Girl Sleuth: Nancy Drew and the Women Who Created Her. New York: Harvest. ISBN 0-15-603056-X.
- Riska, Elianne (2006). Masculinity And Men's Health: Coronary Heart Disease in Medical And Public Discourse. Maryland: Rowman and Littlefield. ISBN 0-7425-2901-0.
- Schleier, Carl (May 18, 1987). "Frank and Joe prove they're the hardy type". Advertising Age. p. 70.
- Rajmohan, Akshay (March 10, 2008). "Teen Sleuths Go Graphic". The Hindu. Madras.
- Scott, Ramsey (September 22, 2006). "Even the hardy boys need friends: an epistolary essay on boredom". Southwest Review. Archived from the original on July 10, 2015 – via HighBeam Research.(subscription required)
- Westfahl, Gary (2000). Science fiction, children's literature, and popular culture: coming of age in fantasyland. California: Greenwood Publishing Group. ISBN 0-313-30847-0.
- Wood, Meredith (2002). "Footprints from the Past: Passing racial stereotypes in the Hardy Boys". In Lee, Josephine D; Lim, Imogene L; Matsukawa, Yuko (eds.). Re/collecting Early Asian America: Essays in Cultural History. Philadelphia: Temple University Press. ISBN 1-56639-964-5.
- Wasylyshyn, John (1982). "An Analysis of American Culture as presented in Two Hardy Boys Books that Differ in Time". In Kottak, Conrad Phillip (ed.). Researching American Culture: A Guide for Student Anthropologists. Ann Arbor: University of Michigan Press. pp. 116–127. ISBN 9780472080243.
- Woolnough, Damien (April 20, 2007). "Tom and Ben as Hardy Men". The Advertiser.
