= Friday Foster (film) =

1975 film by Arthur Marks

- Film poster
- Directed by: Arthur Marks
- Screenplay by: Orville Hampton
- Story by: Arthur Marks
- Based on: Friday Foster; 1970-1974 comic strip by Jim Lawrence; Jorge Longarón
- Produced by: Arthur Marks
- Starring: Pam Grier; Yaphet Kotto; Godfrey Cambridge; Thalmus Rasulala; Ted Lange; Eartha Kitt
- Cinematography: Harry J. May
- Edited by: Stanley Frazen
- Music by: Buddy Baker
- Distributed by: American International Pictures
- Release date: December 25, 1975
- Running time: 90 minutes
- Country: United States
- Language: English

Friday Foster is a 1975 American blaxploitation film directed by Arthur Marks and starring Pam Grier in the title role. Yaphet Kotto, Eartha Kitt, Scatman Crothers and Carl Weathers co-starred. It is an adaptation of the 1970–74 syndicated newspaper comic strip of the same name, scripted by Jim Lawrence and illustrated by Jorge Longarón. This was Grier's final film with American International Pictures. The tagline on the film's poster is "Wham! Bam! Here comes Pam!"

== Plot ==
Friday Foster (Grier) is an ex-magazine model turned magazine photographer who refuses to heed her boss's admonitions against becoming involved in the stories to which she is assigned. After witnessing an assassination attempt on the nation's wealthiest African American, Blake Tarr (Thalmus Rasulala), and then seeing her best friend Cloris Boston (Miles) murdered, Friday finds herself targeted for death. She teams up with private detective Colt Hawkins (Kotto) to investigate, and soon the two are hot on the trail of a plot to eliminate the country's African-American political leadership.

== Cast ==
- Pam Grier as Friday Foster
- Yaphet Kotto as Colt Hawkins
- Godfrey Cambridge as Ford Malotte
- Thalmus Rasulala as Blake Tarr
- Eartha Kitt as Madame Rena
- Jim Backus as Enos Griffith
- Scatman Crothers as Reverend Noble Franklin
- Ted Lange as Fancy Dexter
- Tierre Turner as Cleve
- Paul Benjamin as Senator David Lee Hart
- Jason Bernard as Charles Foley
- Edmund Cambridge as Lieutenant Jake Wayne
- Julius Harris as "Monk" Riley
- Rosalind Miles as Cloris Boston
- Carl Weathers as Yarbro
- John Anthony Bailey as Cop #1
- Mel Carter as Gate Guard

== Analysis ==
=== Racial issues ===
Uplifting the black family was an important part of black unity and self-determination. The black family, especially black women, was expected to play an important role in shaping the next generation. Although the viewers never see who Friday's parents are, her younger brother, Cleave, whom she cares for, is a presence in the film. Cleave represents the next generation in this film. Friday's mission to find and have the hitmen arrested is also a mission to protect her younger brother. As we are to assume that Friday is his only family, if she were to die, her brother would become an orphan and might fall victim to the common traps of black life: poverty, drugs, gangs, etc.

Grier herself talks about the disintegration of black family in an interview with Ebony:

People are not going to church anymore. There's more corruption, more kids dropping out, more young girls from the ages for 13 to 16 who are becoming pregnant. Families have disintegrated. Our parents aren't as strict today. They're not showing that hard, firm love like they used to. I feel we have just lost respect for one another as human beings.

Protecting the next generation from the criminal life would give them the opportunity to become better educated than the last and be leaders in the community and promote black unity. Education was an important part of black power. It was believed that "treating black children as creative, educable beings (rather than aberrant or dysfunctional ones), these revamped institutions would emphasize racial and cultural difference in a positive way--by nurturing a youngster's sense of self and instilling respect for collective responsibility and action."

The film also introduces viewers to comedic versions of two common characters within the black community—the black cop and the pimp. As expressed by Stokely Carmichael, "... black Americans have two problems: they are poor and they are black. All other problems arise from this two-sided reality: lack of education, the so-called apathy of black men." These characters are a part of a disillusioned older generation caught in the claws of systemic oppression, poverty and being black.

=== Gender issues ===
Grier said, "I took the parts no other Hollywood starlet would touch because they didn't want to be demeaned or mess up their nails. It was a risk but I didn't know any better and somehow I came out on top" in response to a question about the heavy sexual visuals in her films. She also made the point of saying that she took those roles, because they were the only ones available to black actresses at the time. However, as she gained more autonomy she was able to control how her character was portrayed in films.

In her interview with Ebony magazine, Grier says, "Half the black men do not respect women. They do not respect their little sisters; they're still using profanity in front of them." This behavior is prevalent in Friday Foster. She also told Jet magazine, "I want to show them I'm not just another body for the camera but a serious actress."

== See also ==
- List of American films of 1975
