= Charles S. Strong =

American writer and adventurer

- Born: Charles Stanley Strong; November 29, 1906; Brooklyn, New York, U.S.
- Died: October 11, 1962 (aged 55); Hempstead, New York, U.S.
- Education: Pace Institute of Accounting and Law; Royal Fredrick University (now the University of Oslo)
- Occupation: Writer
- Writing career
- Pen name: Chuck Stanley, William McClellan, Carl Sturdy, Kelvin McKay, Nancy Bartlett, Myron Keats, Charles Stoddard, Larry Regan, Carolyn Keene, Franklin W. Dixon, possibly several others
- Language: English
- Genres: Mystery, adventure, children's literature
- Subjects: The Hardy Boys, Nancy Drew

Charles Stanley Strong (November 29, 1906 – October 11, 1962) was an American writer, adventurer and explorer.

His pen names include Chuck Stanley, William McClellan, Carl Sturdy, Kelvin McKay, Nancy Bartlett, Myron Keats, Charles Stoddard, Larry Regan, the house names Carolyn Keene and Franklin W. Dixon and possibly several others. His own name was used as a pseudonym for other writers, including Samuel Epstein and Beryl Williams.

Strong wrote The Hardy Boys book The Hooded Hawk Mystery and the Nancy Drew book The Scarlet Slipper Mystery, and once machine-gunned a shark from an airplane.

== Early life and education ==
Born in Brooklyn, New York, on November 29, 1906, Strong studied at the Pace Institute of Accounting and Law and the Royal Fredrick University (now the University of Oslo) in Norway.

An honor student, he gained some early recognition as a twelve-year-old for writing a history of the Great War. The book had nine chapters, brief bios of main figures, 100 photographs, 25 maps, and appendices.

In June 1920, he graduated from Public School No. 90.

== Writing career ==
In 1931, the Brooklyn Eagle Magazine carried a feature article titled "Long Island Man Kills Sharks from Airplane" by Joan Crockett which said

For the past three years he has enjoyed a wide reputation as a traveler, explorer, lecturer and photographer. ... During the past seven years he has had more thrilling adventures than the hero of a dime novel. He has visited fifty different countries. He has explored unknown parts of Scandinavia. He has migrated across the frozen tundras with Swedish, Norwegian, and Finnish Lapps. He has been shipwrecked off the coast of Norway. He has traced a lost colony of the old Norse civilization, taken part in a mapping expedition over northwestern Canada with the Canadian Royal Air Force, led a party across Finland from the northern end of the railway and shot a shark with a machine gun from an airplane. He is an honorary police commissioner in Norway, and a popular hero in Sweden.

The article adds that a Norwegian newspaper called him "The American who knows Scandinavia thoroughly" and a Swedish newspaper "The American who discovered Sweden". He studied Scandinavian literature at the University of Oslo, and his hobbies included riding, hunting, fishing, and automobile and motorboat racing. His "hydroaerographic chart" was used by European pilots. He proposed a peace plan after World War I to the Woodrow Wilson Foundation and the American-Scandinavian Foundation.

Writing as Charles Stoddard, Strong was one of the writers who popularized the Royal Canadian Mounted Police in fiction, with his leading characters: Corporal Buchanan and Constable Carter of the RCMP.

He wrote one of the chapters, "Twelve Days Eastward", in Conquerors of the Sky by Joseph Lewis French, which has an introduction by Amelia Earhart.

He was even mentioned in the Icelandic newspaper Morgunblaðið on November 1, 1928, describing him as the editor of the Scandinavian American News Bureau.

Strong was also the New York correspondent for the short-lived radio publication What's On the Air, circa 1931.

Strong was an editor at Standard Magazines, a.k.a. the Thrilling pulps, from approximately 1936 through 1954, when he retired to devote himself to writing books.

== Death ==
Strong died of a heart attack in Hempstead, New York, at the age of 55 on October 11, 1962.

== Works ==
=== Books ===
==== Fiction ====
by Charles S. Strong:

- Ranger, Sea Dog of the Royal Mounted (1948) About a Samoyed pup which becomes an accomplished sailor.
- South Pole Husky (1950)
- Ranger's Arctic Patrol (1952)
- Snow King, Herd Dog of Lapland (1954, Dodd, Mead) Based on his 1928 treks in Lapland.
- Lassie: Treasure Hunter (1960)
- The Lost Convoy (1960, Chilton) (last published book)

by Charles Stoddard:

- North of the Stars (1937, Dodge, New York, 256 pp.)
- The Trapper of Rat River (1941)
- Killer of Fort Norman (1944)
- Malloy of the Royal Mounted (1944)
- The Timber Beasts (1944)
- The Killer of Sheep River (1946)
- Prairie Peril (1946)
- Tundra Trail (1947, Arcadia House) (Mallory of the Royal Mounted)
- Northwest Trouble (1948)
- The Golden Arrow (1956)

by Larry Regan:

- Bullwacker (1955, W. Foulsham & Company, 150 pp.)

by Franklin W. Dixon:

- The Hooded Hawk Mystery (1954, Grosset & Dunlap) (The Hardy Boys #34)

by Carolyn Keene:

- The Scarlet Slipper Mystery (1954, Grosset & Dunlap) (Nancy Drew #32) Based on an outline by Harriet S. Adams.

==== Nonfiction ====
by Charles S. Strong:

- We Were There with Byrd at the South Pole (1956) (illus. J. Graham Kaye)
- The Story of American Sailing Ships (1957) (illustrated by Gordon Hope Grant)
- The Real Book About the Antarctic (1959) – written for the International Geophysical Year

=== Magazines ===
==== Fiction ====
by Charles S. Strong:

- "Right Side Up in the Arctic", Flying Aces, July 1934 (first known pulp story)
- "Sahara Scout", Sky Birds, February 1935
- "Sealed", Popular Detective, July 1937
- "Chinese Thunder", Thrilling Adventures, August 1938
- "Deep Purple", Army-Navy Flying Stories, Summer 1945
- "Ten Years for Butch", Popular Detective, December 1945

by Chuck Stanley:

- "The Brand Blotter", Blue Ribbon Western, December 1948 (novel length) (last known pulp story)

==== Nonfiction ====
by Charles Strong:

- "Hot Ice", Easy Money, July 1936
- "First Page Signals", Writer's 1943 Year Book, February 1943

by Charles S. Strong:

- "Finland's Fight for Freedom", Thrilling Adventures, February 1940

by Chuck Stanley:

- "Firearms", Exciting Western, December 1945
- "Oklahoma Place Names", Exciting Western, March 1949

=== Comic Books ===
- Two-page text article for Real Life Comics #2 (1941) Light of Liberty about the Statue of Liberty.

== See also ==
- List of American writers
- List of children's literature writers
- List of Pace University people
- List of people from Brooklyn
- List of short story writers
