= APC series =

Series of microcomputers

Logo of NEC APC (Advanced Personal Computer) series

The APC (Advanced Personal Computer) was a series of business microcomputers released outside of Japan by the NEC Corporation. The series comprised the APC, the APC II and APC III, international versions of models from the Japanese NEC N5200 series(jp).

The 8086-based N5200, released in 1981, was the first computer to use the NEC μPD7220 High-Performance Graphics Display Controller.

The better-known PC-9800 series, released a year later by the different division, had a similar architecture to the original N5200 and used many of the same components. The most significant differences between the two were that the PC-9801 had slightly lower vertical screen resolution, graphics were standard instead of optional (still using a second μPD7220) and it used 5.25" floppy drives instead of 8".

The APC IV, despite sharing the series name, was an ordinary IBM PC/AT compatible and not compatible with the earlier APC models.

== N5200 ==
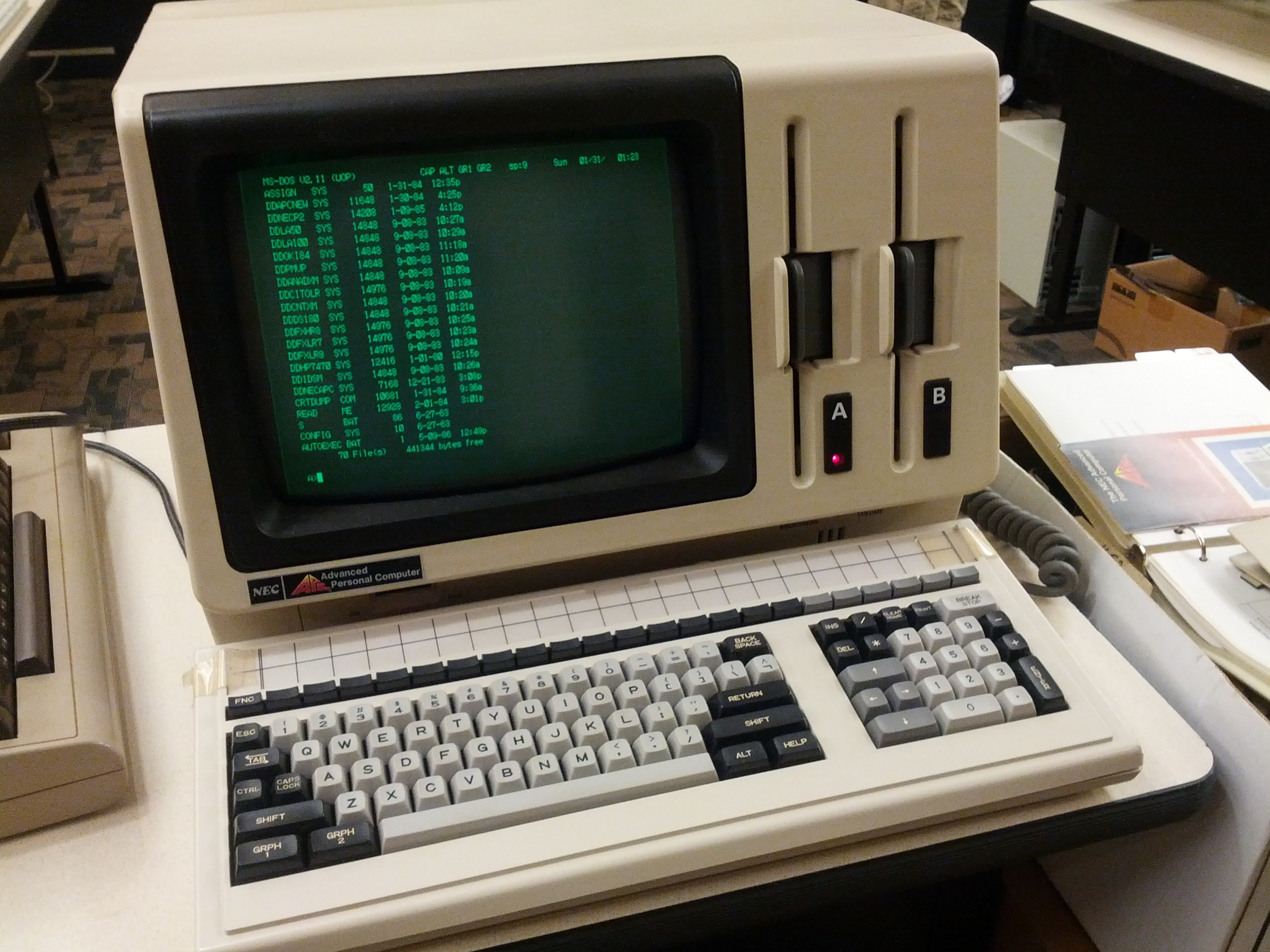
The NEC APC, the first of the series

The N5200 is a series of personal computers released in 1981. The APC is a version of the N5200 that was sold outside Japan.

Although its computer architecture is very similar to the PC-98, it was developed and marketed in a different way. At that time, NEC was a vertical integrated company as seen in other big Japanese companies, and intended to open new business. The management allowed a few divisions to start a new computer business, so each divisions developed own computer systems for different markets. The N5200 was marketed as a personal computer which could be used as both a standalone computer and a computer terminal for ACOS mainframe platforms. It was developed by the Terminal Units Division who developed computer terminals for mainframes, but the PC-98 was developed by the Small Systems Division who developed standalone enterprise systems. The position of the N5200 is similar to IBM 3270 PC, but there is significant difference that the N5200 didn't offer the PC-98 compatibility instead it had own software library.

As of 1982, both CP/M-86 and MS-DOS lacked task switching and support for ISAM, so NEC developed a proprietary operating system for the N5200, called PTOS. PTOS was ported to the PC-98 in the early 1990s, and the N5200 computer line was absorbed.

== APC ==
APC

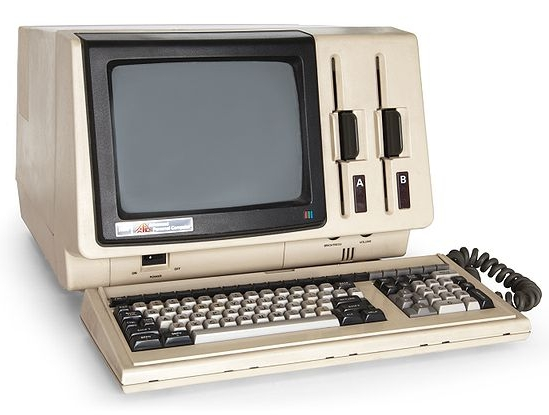
- The NEC APC (1982)
- Manufacturer: Nippon Electric (NEC)
- Type: Personal computer
- Released: 1982; 44 years ago (APC)
- Introductory price: Starting from US$3,298
- Operating system: CP/M-86, MS-DOS
- CPU: 8086 @ 5 MHz
- Memory: 128 to 640 kilobytes
- Removable storage: Floppy discs
- Display: 12" CRT, monochrome or color; 80 × 25 characters text, 8 colors; (640 × 494 with optional hardware)
- Graphics: μPD7220
- Connectivity: Parallel port, RS-232

The first APC was released in 1982 at $3,298 for a single-floppy monochrome system or $4,998 for a dual-floppy color system. It used a 16-bit NEC μPD 8086 CPU with 128 KB of RAM (expandable to 640 KB), 8 KB of ROM, and 4 KB of battery-backed CMOS RAM, a clock/calendar chip, parallel printer and RS-232 serial interfaces, and one or two built-in 8" floppy diskette drives supporting both single-sided single-density (243 KB) and double-sided double-density (1 MB) formats. (An external 10 MB hard disk drive was also available.) The detachable keyboard had 86 keys (including the numeric keypad) and an additional 22 function keys.

=== Display ===
A built-in 12" monochrome or 8-colour display was driven by an NEC μPD7220 display controller generating an 80 × 25 character display. An additional line at the top of the screen displayed status information. Each character was displayed in an 8 × 19 dot cell (giving 640 × 475 screen resolution) and could be one of 250 predefined 7 × 11 glyphs from ROM or 256 user-defined 8 × 16 glyphs from RAM. Each character cell also had an attribute byte indicating the colour (or, for monochrome screens, whether it was highlighted or not) and any mix of reverse video, blinking, over-bar, under-bar and blanked (not displayed).

The optional graphics board adds a second μPD7220 graphics controller with up to 512 KB memory displaying 640 × 494 graphics that overlay the text screen output. (This is higher than the resolution of the user-addressable text screen because graphics can overlay the status line as well.) The graphics controller allows panning the screen over the display memory, zooming, independent scrolling of different screen areas and other graphics functions. A light pen can be used for input.

=== Software ===
Operating systems included CP/M-86 and MS-DOS.

There are 12 known commercial games, all from Infocom:

Games
Deadline
Enchanter
Infidel
Planetfall
Seastalker
Sorcerer
Starcross
Suspended
The Witness
Zork I: The Great Underground Empire
Zork II: The Wizard of Frobozz
Zork III: The Dungeon Master

== APC III ==
APC III
- Manufacturer: Nippon Electric (NEC)
- Type: Personal computer
- Released: 1984; 42 years ago (APC III)
- Operating system: MS-DOS 2.11
- CPU: 8086 @ 8 MHz
- Memory: 128 kilobytes and higher
- Removable storage: Floppy discs
- Display: NTSC TV or monitor; 80 × 25 characters; 8 colors; 640 × 200, 640 × 400
- Graphics: μPD7220
- Connectivity: Parallel port, RS-232 x1 with 2 more serial via an expansion card

The APC III (Advanced Personal Computer) was released by NEC in 1984. An update on the NEC APC II, which replaced the original NEC APC, all the NEC APC models utilized the Intel 8086 processor, unlike the IBM PC and clones.

The unit was physically smaller than an IBM-PC. The compact case included two 5 1/4" half-height disks (two floppies or one floppy and one hard disk), and space for standard options (hard disk controller, additional video memory). Special options (including additional system memory) required using expansion slots, of which four were available.

C-bus expansion cards (PCBs) could be inserted without removal of the exterior case, as was required for the IBM PC.

The entire computer could be disassembled to functional blocks (e.g.: expansion card cage, power supply, disk drive cage) with removal of a few easy access screws. Other components didn't even need a screwdriver, except for the outer case, by using robust plastic clips. The disk cage could be further disassembled if required.

As with the IBM PC, the maximum usable memory was 640 KB (the address range of the Intel 8088 and 8086 is 1 MB). The APC came with 128 KB standard.

=== Specification ===
Feature	APC-III	IBM-PC
Speed	8 MHz	4.77 MHz
Resolution	640 × 400	640 × 200
Storage (floppy)	720 KB (80 track, DD)	320 KB (40 track, DD)

=== Hardware ===
==== Interfaces ====
RS-232 serial, Centronics parallel and video interfaces were built onto the motherboard, whereas expansion cards were required for almost every function of an IBM PC except for the CPU, BIOS and built-in RAM.

==== Display ====
Maximum display capabilities were a text mode of 80 × 25 characters (with four planes) and/or graphics at 640 × 400 pixels (with two planes). Either text, graphics, or graphics with text overlay were software selectable. The base one bit-per-pixel was easily upgradeable to three bits per pixel (taking the graphics mode from monochrome to either eight colours or eight shades of grey). The computer was capable of running monochrome (or grey) through an NTSC TV monitor, although this was not recommended (text reduced to 40 × 20, graphics to 640 × 200). Monochrome (usually green) or color screens were usually included in the price. The APC III's 'on-board' video controller meant that upgrades (other than internally mounted video memory) could not be achieved, and the display was stuck at 640 × 400 with 8 colors.

The NEC APC series supported a proprietary NEC APC character set and user-definable fonts in text mode.

==== Expansion bus ====
The expansion bus supported 16-bit-wide data and 20-bit-wide address capability. By comparison, the original IBM supported an 8-bit data bus with 20-bit address, which was later revised to 16 data bits and 24 address bits in the PC AT.

The motherboard was designed to allow easy addition of an 8087 math co-processor.

==== Disk drives ====
Most Australian units were shipped with 720 KB floppy disk drives (80 track, double density), although specifications imply the drives were only 360 KB (40 track, DD). 360 KB disks were readable and writeable by 'double-stepping' the 720 KB drives.

Users could also purchase a hard disk expansion option. This was initially limited to the 10 MB ST-506 hard disks. This capacity could be increased to 20 MB (but no higher) after upgrading to MS-DOS 3.1.

The hard disk controller was only configured to operate a single internal hard disk. An external hard disk expansion port was available, so you could have two floppies and an external hard drive, or one floppy with an internal hard drive.

=== Operating systems ===
Shipped standard with MS-DOS 2.11, other operating systems were available, such as the Unix derivative, PC-UX. Later, MS DOS 3.1 was released for the APC.

=== Compatibility ===
The APC III was not fully compatible with the IBM-PC, either on a hardware level (although some parts were compatible), or a software level (although again, some software was compatible).

Later on NEC released the SLE card, or 'Software Library Expander', that was essentially an IBM PC on an expansion board, although graphics was limited to CGA only, quite a step down from the native graphics.

The earlier penetration of the market saw PC clones adopt the IBM PC architecture. In the export markets, NEC fell into line with the 16-bit IBM-AT architecture and did not pursue the APC-III architecture any further.

== APC IV ==
APC IV
- Manufacturer: Nippon Electric (NEC)
- Type: Personal computer
- Released: 1986; 40 years ago (APC IV)
- CPU: Intel 80286 @ 10 MHz
- Memory: 640 kilobytes to 1MB
- Storage: Hard drive

The APC IV, released in 1986, was an IBM PC/AT clone that was not designed to be compatible with previous APC models.

== See also ==
- NEC APC character set
- NEC PC-9800 series
