= Extended BASIC =

Extended BASIC may refer to:

- TI Extended BASIC, for the TI-99/4A home computer
- Data General Extended BASIC (also known as Nova Extended BASIC), for the Data General Nova series minicomputers
- Microsoft BASIC#Extended BASIC-80
