= Tiki-100 =

1984 home computer

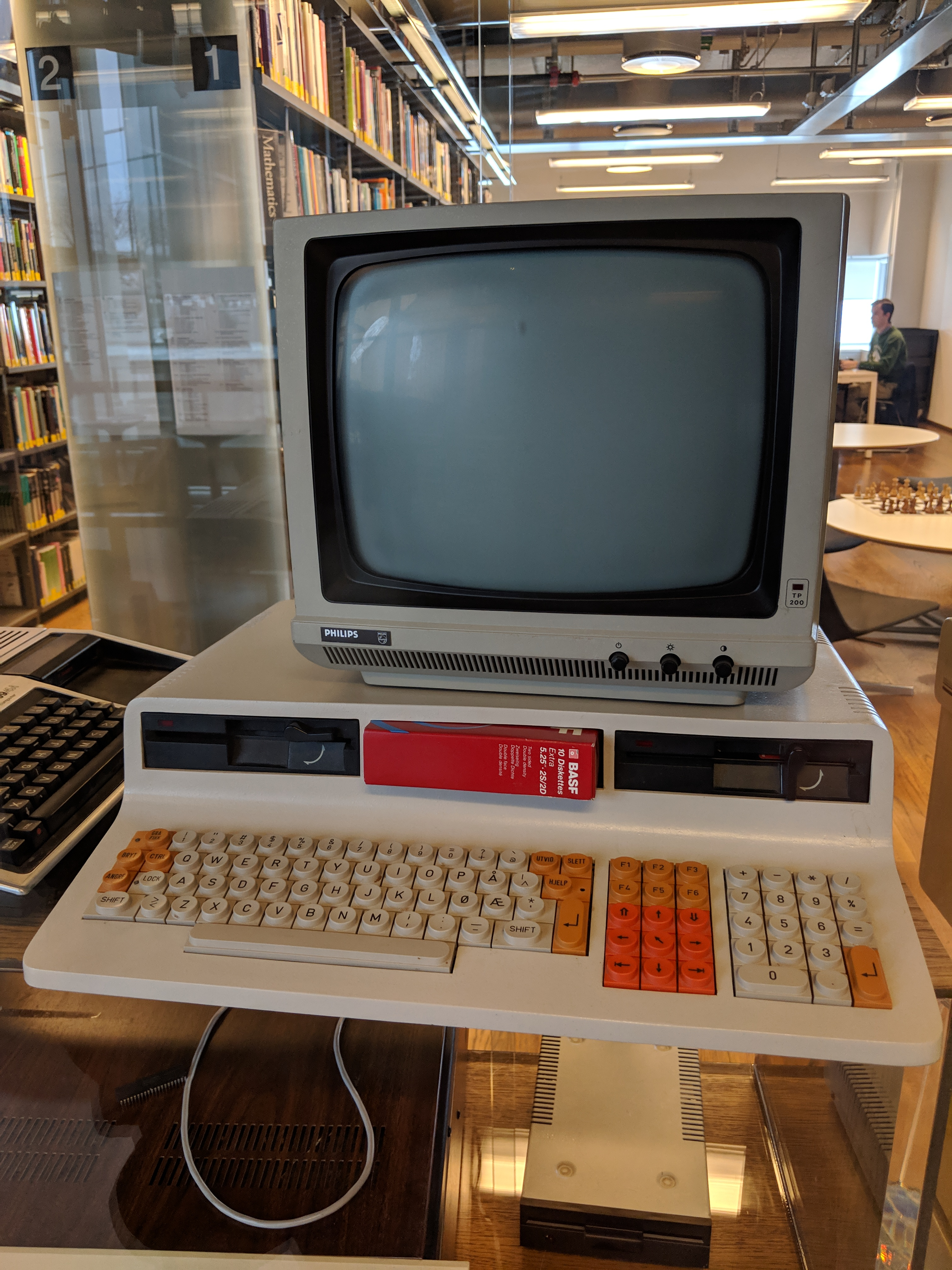
- Also known as: Kontiki-100
- Developer: Tiki Data
- Manufacturer: Tiki Data
- Type: Desktop computer
- Released: April 1984; 42 years ago
- Introductory price: NOK 12,000 (1984) (~US$1,350)
- Discontinued: 1989; 37 years ago
- Media: 5.25" Floppy disks
- Operating system: TIKO, BBC BASIC, COMAL (Tiki-100) TIKOS (8/16) MS-DOS 2.11 (Rev. D)
- CPU: Z80 @ 4MHz (Tiki-100); Z80 & 8088 @ 4MHz (8/16 & Rev. D)
- Memory: 64KB RAM, 32KB VRAM, 8KB ROM; 256 to 736 KB RAM (8/16 & Rev. D)
- Storage: Hard drive (8/16)
- Graphics: 256-color palette; 256x256x16, 512x256x4 or 1024x256x2 simultaneous colours (Tiki-100); CGA (Rev. D)
- Sound: AY-3-8912
- Connectivity: RS-232, Centronics
- Successor: Tiki 200

Tiki-100 was a desktop home/personal computer manufactured by Tiki Data of Oslo, Norway. The computer was launched in the spring of 1984 under the original name Kontiki-100, and was first and foremost intended for the emerging educational sector, especially for primary schools. Early prototypes had 4 KB ROM, and the '100' in the machine's name was based on the total amount of memory in kilobytes.

== Development ==
In December 1982, as many as 75 different models of computer were found to be in use in Norwegian schools, with as many as 30 schools being the only users of their chosen system. Such fragmentation was regarded as hindering the development and sharing of educational software, and a need had also arisen to ensure that computing equipment procured for schools would be flexible, expandable, and adaptable to new applications. On the basis of consultations and a tendering process for personal computers, a specification was formulated for computing equipment in the Norwegian school system, and it was decided by the Norwegian government that school computers would, at least in the first instance, employ the established operating system CP/M.

The Tiki-100 was developed as a direct response to this decision, and was as such greatly influenced by the specifications laid out by the government. One of the most influential of these specifications was compatibility with CP/M, which correspondingly influenced the choice of the Z80 as CPU.

Being designed as a computer intended for education, interactivity was prioritized. The machine was given good audiovisual capabilities for its time. While other educational computers at the time had a main focus on BASIC and simple computer-science, the Tiki-100 had more focus on being a tool to aid in education and everyday-life situations. This put forth the need and memory requirements to run more complex applications.

The first prototype was built using wire-wrap and a bigger prototype case. Soon followed a prototype made on PCB, and there were very little changes from this prototype to the final product. The most significant changes was the change from Siemens keyboard switches to cheaper Sasse switches, along with the re-arranging of the analog video output connection. Very few, if any, revision A or B Tiki-100 computers ever hit the store shelves.

Unveiled in the press as the Kontiki-100 in late 1983, the Tiki-100 was released under its eventual name in the spring of 1984. Thor Heyerdahl threatened to open a legal case on the use of the Kontiki name, with reference to the name of his famous raft. The name was changed to "Tiki-100" as a result. Around the same time, Computerworld magazine claimed the operating system "KP/M" was a direct copy of CP/M, due to KP/M being able to run CP/M software. As a response to these claims, KP/M was renamed "Tiko" to avoid any implicit association with CP/M and Digital Research.

== Specifications ==
Specifications for the basic Tiki-100 model:

- CPU: Zilog Z80 running at 4 MHz.
- Memory: 64 KB of RAM (main memory), 32 KB of graphical memory and 8 KB of ROM.
- Keyboard: An N-key rollover mechanical keyboard integrated into the computer case
- Graphics: PAL-compatible, based on discrete TTL components. Bitmap graphics with a 256-color palette, supporting 3 different resolutions with 256x256x16 colours, 512x256x4 colours or 1024x256x2 simultaneous colours. The Tiki-100 has no text-mode as it used bitmapped graphics only. However, terminal emulators provided options of 40, 80 or 160 by 25 characters, each option using one of the three modes. All of the graphics modes have hardware vertical scroll.
- Audio: An AY-3-8912 polyphonic sound generator
- Storage: One or two integrated 5¼ inch floppy disk drives
- Interfaces: Two RS-232 serial ports, One Centronics printer port

Software included:

- TIKO, a CP/M 2.2-compatible operating system
- A version of the BBC BASIC programming language interpreter
- A COMAL interpreter

Optional expansions:

- A harddisk controller, replacing one of the floppy disk stations with a 8MB harddisk.
- A bespoke network-hub that allowed up to 16 computers to connect in a network, sharing disks and printers. The server was a Tiki-100 with harddisk, running the MP/M operating system, serving up to 3 different printers simultaneously.

=== 8/16 upgrade ===
An 8/16 upgrade was possible, consisting of a secondary CPU card with a 4 MHz 8088 processor. With this upgrade the machine is capable of running MS-DOS 2.11, with RAM being expanded up to 736 KB, while retaining full compatibility with the Z80 based TIKOS. Although running MS-DOS, the expansion does not provide PC-compatibility. When programs are running on the 8088, the Z80 CPU is serving as an I/O processor, handling disk I/O, graphics etc.

=== Tiki-100 8/16 ===
The combination of 8088 and Z80 processors, introduced by the 8/16 upgrade, led to the introduction of distinct IBM PC compatible models running MS-DOS, starting with the Tiki-100 8/16 Rev. C, offering support for DOS programs but not IBM-compatible graphics. The Tiki-100 Rev. D remedied this incompatibility, offering CGA-compatible graphics capabilities, and thereby being able to run a variety of major PC applications, including those within the Graphics Environment Manager (GEM) user interface, this being bundled with the machine along with a Logitech mouse. The performance of GEM was regarded as sluggish using the 8088. The machine also contained a Z80 processor, sharing the same bus as the 8088, so that it could run the original Tiki-100 software under the 8088 operating system with certain caveats, supporting only non-graphical programs or graphical programs modified to support the CGA standard. The system was priced from kr 35,760 including taxes, this being seen as "steep" in comparison to PC clones with broadly comparable specifications including those with the faster 8 MHz 8088 part at around half the Tiki's price. A Tandon PC AT with 80286 processor was only kr 4,000 more expensive. Both the Rev. C and D models were sold alongside the original model.

== Tiki-200 and successors ==
After the commercial failure of the Tiki-100 rev. D, it was succeeded by the Tiki-200. This was a standard IBM PC-clone, with imported hardware which did not make any attempt at maintaining backward-compatibility with the Tiki-100. Similarly, the Tiki-300 was reported as a Taiwan-produced IBM PC AT clone, although Tiki-Data's own publicity claimed that all models, including its Tiki-386 model were "produced in Norway to West European quality standards".

Despite its machines having approved status in the Norwegian education sector, Tiki-Data began to encounter robust competition from IBM and suppliers of PC-compatibles in key markets, such as in Oslo where the municipality controversially chose to procure IBM PC systems with a value of kr 5,000,000 instead of established educational models from Tiki-Data and Scandis. Such difficulties, along with abandoned attempts to expand into the Swedish and Dutch markets, and with tightening public sector budgets, led to substantial financial losses and resulted in redundancies affecting half of the small company's employees.

Tiki-Data continued to sell computers and, in 1989, claimed over 15000 machines within the Norwegian school and higher education system. Nevertheless, it was unable to maintain a stable foothold in the broader personal computer market and went into gradual decline. In 1996 the company along with its deficit was bought by Merkantildata.

== Software ==
Five commercial game titles are published for the Norwegian Tiki-100 computer by Tiki Data, including Femten-spill, Robot, Tiki Invaders, Sjakk and Pyton.
