= The Wailing Siren Mystery =

1951 book by Franklin W. Dixon

- Original edition
- Author: Franklin W. Dixon
- Language: English
- Series: The Hardy Boys
- Genre: Detective, mystery
- Publisher: Grosset & Dunlap
- Publication date: January 1, 1951
- Publication place: United States
- Media type: Print (hardback & paperback)
- Pages: 192 pp
- Preceded by: The Secret of the Lost Tunnel
- Followed by: The Secret of Wildcat Swamp

The Wailing Siren Mystery is the thirtieth volume in the original The Hardy Boys series of mystery books for children and teens published by Grosset & Dunlap.

This book was written for the Stratemeyer Syndicate by Andrew E. Svenson in 1951. Between 1959 and 1973 the first 38 volumes of this series were systematically revised as part of a project directed by Harriet Adams, Edward Stratemeyer's daughter. The original version of this book was shortened in 1968 by Priscilla Baker-Carr resulting in two similar stories sharing the same title.

== Plot summary ==
Their SOS ignored by a strange yacht in a storm, the Hardy Boys find a wallet alongside their speedboat, apparently dropped from a helicopter, containing two thousand dollars, and are launched into a mystery involving diverse clues. This includes finding out who kidnapped Jack Wayne and took his plane, and where the wailing siren is coming from.

Early on in the story Frank is attacked by a masked man while walking home. The man overpowers Frank and puts him in a car, bound gagged and blindfolded. He is driven to a cottage and imprisoned in a basement, with the intention to ransom him to his family. He escapes on his own, however. Near the end Frank and Joe are captured by two of the men, who grab them and tie them tightly to a tree. Their father, Fenton Hardy, later rescues them, and the criminals are caught.
