= Tiki Data =

Norwegian microcomputer manufacturer

- Industry: Electronics
- Founded: 1983; 43 years ago
- Founders: Lars Monrad Krohn; Gro Jørgensen
- Defunct: 1996
- Fate: Acquired by Merkantildata
- Headquarters: Oslo, Norway
- Products: Tiki 100

Tiki Data was a manufacturer of microcomputers, located in Oslo, Norway. The company was founded in 1983 by Lars Monrad Krohn and Gro Jørgensen, and was targeting the then emerging computer market in the educational sector. Following the launch of the Tiki 100 computer, which was designed by Tiki Data from the bottom up, the company started publishing software for the educational sector. Following the impact of the IBM PC, the company switched to selling rebranded PC-compatible computers.

Tiki Data was bought by Merkantildata in 1996, and ceased to exist from that point on.
