= The Clue in the Embers =

Book by Franklin W. Dixon

- Original edition
- Author: Franklin W. Dixon
- Language: English
- Series: The Hardy Boys
- Genre: Detective, mystery
- Publisher: Grosset & Dunlap
- Publication date: January 1, 1956
- Publication place: United States
- Media type: Print (hardback & paperback)
- Pages: 192 pp
- Preceded by: The Hooded Hawk Mystery
- Followed by: The Secret of Pirates' Hill

The Clue in the Embers is the thirty-fifth volume in the original The Hardy Boys series of mystery books for children and teens published by Grosset & Dunlap.

This book was written for the Stratemeyer Syndicate by John Almquist in 1955. Between 1959 and 1973 the first 38 volumes of this series were systematically revised as part of a project directed by Harriet Adams, Edward Stratemeyer's daughter. The original version of this book was shortened in 1972 by Priscilla Baker-Carr resulting in two slightly different stories sharing the same title.

== Plot summary ==
In their quest to solve the mystery of the two missing medallions from an inherited curio collection, the Hardy brothers find themselves embroiled in a thrilling adventure that takes them to the remote and desolate region of Guatemala. This perilous journey unfolds against a backdrop of intrigue and danger as they inadvertently cross paths with a ruthless gang of thugs. Unbeknownst to the Hardys, this sinister group harbors dark intentions to steal a national treasure hidden within this cursed and foreboding land.

The legends and stories of the locals serve as ominous warnings, cautioning the brothers against venturing further into the treacherous territory. The whispers of curses, haunting spirits, and unexplained disappearances add an eerie element to the unfolding mystery.

However, the Hardys are not the only ones seeking this elusive national treasure. Other, equally determined men, with their own motivations and agendas, are also on the hunt. The race to unearth the secret of the missing medallions and the valuable treasure becomes a high-stakes contest, fraught with tension, deceit, and unexpected alliances.

As the brothers navigate this perilous landscape, they must rely on their wits, courage, and resourcefulness to outsmart the dangerous gang, unlock the secrets of the cursed area, and ultimately recover the medallions, all while protecting the national treasure from falling into the wrong hands.
