= The Mystery of the Flying Express =

Book by Franklin W. Dixon

Mystery of the Flying Express
- Original edition
- Author: Franklin W. Dixon
- Illustrator: Paul Luane
- Language: English
- Series: Hardy Boys
- Genre: Detective, mystery
- Publisher: Grosset & Dunlap
- Publication date: January 1, 1941
- Publication place: United States
- Media type: Print (hardback & paperback)
- Pages: 192 pp
- Preceded by: The Disappearing Floor
- Followed by: The Clue of the Broken Blade

The Mystery of the Flying Express is the twentieth volume in the original The Hardy Boys series of mystery books for children and teens published by Grosset & Dunlap.

This book was written for the Stratemeyer Syndicate by John Button in 1941. Between 1959 and 1973 the first 38 volumes of this series were systematically revised as part of a project directed by Harriet Adams, Edward Stratemeyer's daughter. The original version of this book was rewritten in 1970 by Vincent Buranelli and retitled to Mystery of the Flying Express.

Because of Dr. John Button's death in 1967, The Mystery Of The Flying Express (1941) entered the Canadian Public Domain on January 1, 2017.

== Plot ==
=== Revised edition ===
After the new hydrofoil they are guarding, the Flying Express, is stolen, the Hardy Boys face frequent danger in solving a mystery involving criminals who operate by signs of the zodiac. Eventually they are kidnapped and taken to the Flying Express, but Chet manages to escape and uses their car's emergency light to alert the Coast Guard at which point the boys foul the hydrofoil's propellers and stop the ship.

=== Original edition ===
The Hardy boys help their father locate a foreign spy camp hidden somewhere in the western United States. In the original edition, the Flying Express is a daily passenger train used by the spies to send secret messages.
