= The Secret of the Lost Tunnel =

Book by Franklin W. Dixon

- Original edition
- Author: Franklin W. Dixon
- Language: English
- Series: The Hardy Boys
- Genre: Detective, mystery
- Publisher: Grosset & Dunlap
- Publication date: January 1, 1950
- Publication place: United States
- Media type: Print (hardback & paperback)
- Pages: 174 pp
- Preceded by: The Sign of the Crooked Arrow
- Followed by: The Wailing Siren Mystery

The Secret of the Lost Tunnel is the twenty-ninth volume in the original The Hardy Boys series of mystery books for children and teens published by Grosset & Dunlap.

This book was written for the Stratemeyer Syndicate by Andrew E. Svenson in 1950. Between 1959 and 1973, the first 38 volumes of this series were systematically revised as part of a project directed by Harriet Adams, Edward Stratemeyer's daughter. The original version of this book was shortened in 1968, resulting in two different stories with the same title.

== Plot summary ==
The Hardy Boys travel with Brigadier General Jack Smith to a historic Civil War battlefield in the Deep South. Rocky Run Battlefield (near the town of Centerville in an unnamed state) is the center of a legend involving a Confederate general who was disgraced due to his alleged involvement with the theft of gold from a bank. Smith seeks to vindicate the long-dead officer.
