= The Yellow Feather Mystery =

Book by Franklin W. Dixon

- Original edition
- Author: William Dougherty (under Franklin W. Dixon)
- Language: English
- Series: The Hardy Boys
- Genre: Detective, mystery
- Publisher: Grosset & Dunlap
- Publication date: 1954
- Media type: Print (hardback & paperback)
- Pages: 192
- Preceded by: The Crisscross Shadow
- Followed by: The Hooded Hawk Mystery

The Yellow Feather Mystery is the thirty-third volume in the original The Hardy Boys series of mystery books published by Grosset & Dunlap. It was written for the Stratemeyer Syndicate by William Dougherty in 1954, under the pen name of Franklin W. Dixon.

Between 1959 and 1973, the first 38 volumes of this series were systematically revised as part of a project directed by Harriet Adams, Edward Stratemeyer's daughter. The original version of this book was shortened in 1971 by Priscilla Baker-Carr, resulting in two slightly different stories sharing the same title.

== Plot ==
The Hardy Boys go skating up Willow River toward Woodson Academy where they meet Gregory Woodson. Greg tells about his grandfather who died seven weeks prior, but no one has been able to find his will where he presumably leaves the Woodson Academy to Greg. Greg is also curious about a strange letter that he received which was a blank piece of paper with small rectangular cutouts arranged horizontally and the word ‘Hardy’ printed on it.

With the grandfather's will missing, the school's headmaster Henry Kurt is trying to assume ownership of the school against Greg Woodson's wishes. The Hardy Boys and their friends find themselves being attacked by unknown assailants until eventually they are able to locate the missing will and trap the dangerous criminal and solve the Yellow Feather mystery.
