= Christopher Cool =

1960s juvenile mystery and spy book series

Christopher Cool: TEEN Agent is a series of six young adult novels produced between 1967 and 1969 by the Stratemeyer Syndicate and published by Grosset & Dunlap. They were written by Jack Lancer, a pseudonym.

TEEN is an acronym for Top-secret Educational Espionage Network, which is a fictional branch of the CIA. TEEN recruits the best students from leading colleges and universities. The young agents travel the world on assignments. Christopher goes to the Middle East in Mission:Moonfire; he is at the Riviera in X Marks the Spy; and he works in London in Department of Danger.

The novels have hardcovers, and each title was advertised as being illustrated with twenty drawings. The series was sold in stores until at least 1972.

== Authors ==
At least two individuals have been cited as having connections to the series. A 1969 newspaper article stated that Jim Lawrence was the author, and a 1977 article said that Robert Calder created the series.

== Characters ==
Christopher Cool is a blonde blue-eyed student at Kingston University. He is fluent in dozens of languages, but his professors believe he "prefers discotheques to study hall, since his spy activities take him away from campus so frequently."

Geronimo Johnson is Chris' Apache roommate, who helped him solve cases.

Chris and Geronimo don’t carry guns, but instead use a pen-like anesthetic weapon called "sleepy sliver" to incapacitate their enemies. They are both skilled in martial arts, and use their abilities to disarm foes. TEEN gave them training in electronics, photography, cryptography, flying and scuba diving.

Other members of TEEN include Spice Carter, a student at Vassar College; Yummi Toyama, a Japanese-American student who attends Berkeley, and Beauregard Tatum, an African-American student at Harvard.

== Books in series ==
- X Marks the Spy (1967)
- Mission: Moonfire (1967)
- Department of Danger (1967)
- Ace of Shadows (1968)
- Heads You Lose (1968)
- Trial by Fury (1969)

== Foreign editions ==
All six novels were published in France by Hachette between 1969 and 1973 under the title Chris Cool. They were also translated into Swedish, where Christopher was renamed Ronnie Clark.
