= The Sign of the Crooked Arrow =

Book by Franklin W. Dixon

- Original edition
- Author: Franklin W. Dixon
- Language: English
- Series: The Hardy Boys
- Genre: Detective, mystery
- Publisher: Grosset & Dunlap
- Publication date: January 1, 1949
- Publication place: United States
- Media type: Print (hardback & paperback)
- Pages: 192 pp
- ISBN: 0-448-08928-9
- OCLC: 19495942
- Preceded by: The Secret of Skull Mountain
- Followed by: The Secret of the Lost Tunnel

The Sign of the Crooked Arrow is the twenty-eighth volume in the original The Hardy Boys series of mystery books for children and teens published by Grosset & Dunlap.

This book was written for the Stratemeyer Syndicate by Andrew E. Svenson in 1949. Between 1959 and 1973, the first 38 volumes of this series were systematically revised as part of a project directed by Harriet Adams, Edward Stratemeyer's daughter. The original version of this book was shortened in 1970 by Priscilla Baker-Carr, resulting in two different stories with the same title.

== Plot summary ==
The Hardy brothers interrupt their investigations of jewelry store holdups to answer a plea from their cousin on a New Mexico cattle ranch. They discover how Arrow cigarettes can knock people out using a gas that comes out from a vent in the ground in New Mexico, originally discovered by American Indians.
