= Epson QX-10 =

Microcomputer

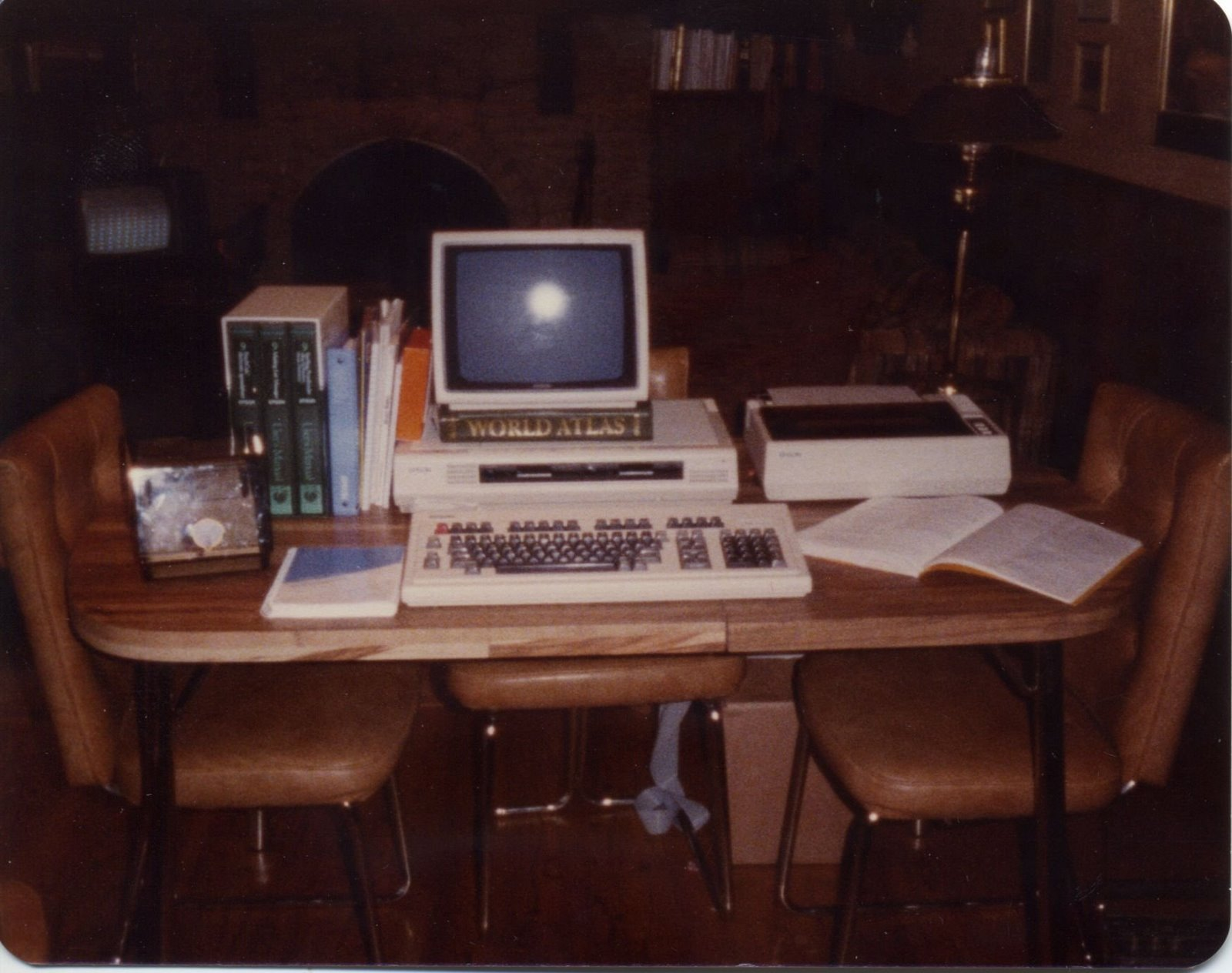
- An Epson QX-10 with RX-80 printer
- Manufacturer: Epson
- Released: 1983; 43 years ago
- Introductory price: £1735 (U.K., 1984); 1990 FF (France, January 1988).
- Media: Floppy disk
- Operating system: CP/M or TPM-III (CP/M-80 compatible)
- CPU: Zilog Z80 @ 4 MHz
- Memory: 64 or 256 KB of RAM
- Storage: 340 KB 5.25" disk-drives
- Display: 80 x 24 text mode, 640 x 400 pixels monochrome
- Graphics: NEC μPD7220
- Sound: Beeper
- Power: 100 Watts (Built-in PSU)
- Dimensions: 50.8 cm x 30.4 cm x 10.3 cm
- Weight: 9.4 kg (computer), 5.5 kg (monitor), 2.5 kg (keyboard)

The Epson QX-10 is a microcomputer running CP/M or TPM-III (CP/M-80 compatible) which was introduced in 1983. It is based on a Zilog Z80 microprocessor, running at 4 MHz, provides up to 256 KB of RAM organized in four switchable banks, and includes a separate graphics processor chip (μPD7220) manufactured by NEC to provide advanced graphics capabilities. In the USA and Canada, two versions were launched; a basic CP/M configuration with 64 KB RAM, and the HASCI configuration with 256 KB RAM and the special HASCI keyboard to be used with the bundled application suite, called Valdocs. TPM-III was used for Valdocs and some copy protected programs like Logo Professor. The European and Japanese versions were CP/M configurations with 256 KB RAM and a graphical BASIC interpreter.

The machine has internal extension slots, which can be used for extra serial ports, network cards or third party extensions like an Intel 8088 processor, adding MS-DOS compatibility.

Rising Star Industries was the primary American software vendor for the HASCI QX series. Its product line included the TPM-II and III operating system, Valdocs, a robust BASIC language implementation, a graphics API library used by a variety of products which initially supported line drawing and fill functions and was later extended to support the QX-16 color boards, Z80 assembler, and low level Zapple machine code monitor which can be invoked from DIP switch setting on the rear of the machine.

The QX-10 was succeeded by the QX-16 (see bellow).

== Performance and stability issues ==
BYTE in September 1982 favorably reported on the forthcoming QX-10 and Valdocs—then scheduled to ship by Christmas 1982—after a private viewing. The magazine cited Epson's dominance of the printer market as among the reason to expect the success of what it described as perhaps "the first of a new breed of anybody-can-use-it 'appliance' computers".

When shipped, Valdocs on the QX-10 was very slow and buggy. InfoWorld's 1983 review of the QX-10 described the software as "great idea, questionable implementation". The authors reported that Valdocs on the computer "is slow. Sometimes it merely dawdles slightly, but other times, it crawls. Entering text becomes a disconcerting pastime when the screen display lags as many as 60 characters behind your typing, and you lose characters". They added that "VALDOCS crashed (failed) numerous times while we were using it to write this review. We lost data each time, came close to losing a whole disk, and ended up retyping it into our trusty IBM PC to meet deadline". The authors advised users to backup their files, but stated that since the process was so slow the computer encouraged them to avoid doing so until it was too late. While praising the QX-10 itself ("Physically this is an excellent machine") and Valdocs' ease of use, Jerry Pournelle wrote in BYTE in August 1983 that "the first problem is obvious from the other side of the room. The Valdocs system is slow. It seems to take forever to do disk operations ... Getting from the beginning to the end of a six-page document takes 15 seconds. Deleting the first three pages of the same document takes 20 seconds". He believed that the software "has pushed the Zilog Z80 chip past its limits ... I don't think Valdocs will ever run properly until something like the 8086 or 68000 is used".

In January 1984 Pournelle reported that version 1.18 "is fast, [but] it's not fast enough for me, my wife, or my assistant. In particular, it is not designed to be used as a substitute for an office machine. It simply takes too darned long to get a business letter out using Valdocs. Just getting the envelope addressed can take a full minute or longer." He reiterated that "the hardware is fine", but wondered if "the industry need yet another Z80 computer for more than $2500" without usable software. Pournelle concluded, "I cannot in good conscience recommend [Valdocs] to anyone who has actual production work to perform. It's just too darned slow." The president of one QX-10 user group complained in April that the word processor was "slow compared to my mother running the mile ... I have four different versions and not one works well". Creative Computing's mostly favorable review of the computer and software in June also noted the slow speed of the Valdocs editor, calling it "maddeningly slow in many cases". It noted that the QX-10's 4 MHz processor was not at fault, because other word processors ran as fast as on other 8-bit CP/M computers.

Epson in 1982 promised Valdocs 2.0 in mid-1983. Despite the company's promise of speed improvements, Valdocs 2 remained slow; John V. Lombardi's 1985 InfoWorld's review of the QX-16 reported that the computer was "severely limited by [Valdocs'] slow operation". While he did not report crashes, Lombardi found a "small but perceptible delay" between pushing a key and the character appearing on the screen when using the word processor grew over time to be "significant and would annoy heavy-duty word processing users", and the spreadsheet was "excruciatingly slow to do just about everything". Pournelle concluded that year that Valdocs "was fatally flawed", noting that Epson advised Valdocs 2 users to share data between the chart maker and word processor with "scissors, tape, and a copy machine". When reviewing the Epson Equity in 1986, Lombardi described the QX as "disastrous" for the company.

== Games ==
There are 15 known commercial games released for Epson QX-10, all from Infocom.

Game Name	Publisher
Cutthroat	Infocom
Deadline	Infocom
Enchanter	Infocom
Infidel	Infocom
Planetfall	Infocom
Seastalker	Infocom
Sorcerer	Infocom
Starcross	Infocom
Suspect	Infocom
Suspended	Infocom
The HitchHiker's Guide to the Galaxy	Infocom
The Witness	Infocom
Zork I	Infocom
Zork II	Infocom
Zork III	Infocom

== QX-16 ==
Epson QX-16
- Manufacturer: Epson
- Released: 1985; 41 years ago
- Media: Floppy disk
- Operating system: Valdocs 2.0, CP/M, MS-DOS 2.11
- CPU: Zilog Z80 + 8088
- Memory: 512 KB
- Storage: two 5.25" disk-drives
- Display: 640 x 400, 640 x 320, 320 x 200
- Graphics: NEC μPD7220

The successor to the QX-10, the dual-processor QX-16 was introduced in 1985 and added a 16-bit Intel 8088 processor and 512 KB of RAM, enabling it to also boot MS-DOS 2.11. Graphics are powered by a NEC 7220 with 128KB of dedicated video memory, capable of displaying in 640 x 400 in Valdocs and 640 x 320 or 320 x 200 in MS-DOS. The case of the QX-16 was enlarged to provide enough physical space for an internal hard-drive in contrast to the QX-10's dual-floppy configuration.

== Valdocs ==
An Epson QX-16 booting Valdocs

VALuable DOCumentS by Rising Star Industries is a pseudo-GUI WYSIWYG integrated software/OS for document creation and management, written as a set of interactive application and system modules which ran only on Epson's QX-10 and QX-16 computers. A version designed to run on the IBM PC was in development when Rising Star closed in 1986.

Valdocs shipped to beta testers c. late 1982. Beta and initial production releases of Valdocs' application modules were written in the Forth programming language while its system-oriented modules (such as E-Mail and disk utilities) were written in Z-80 Assembly Language. Later releases of Valdocs' applications were written in the C programming language with some modules written in compiled RSI Basic.

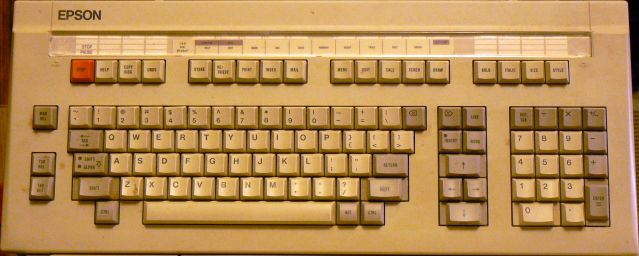
Valdocs specific keyboard on an Epson QX-16

The initial release of Valdocs includes WYSIWYG word processor and spreadsheet applications (with onscreen fonts, an UNDO key, keyboard macros and multiple screen formats), a cardfile database, an E-Mail/communications module, and a desktop manager with an address book, mailing list manager, notepad, spell checker, ValDraw & ValPaint, calculator and more. The E-Mail program works in the background allowing mail to be sent by modem to another computer. Valdocs was one of the first environments that allowed users to embed items like spreadsheets and figures in word processing documents.

Switching between programs is done by pressing an associated hotkey on the QX-10's keyboard (which was specifically designed to support Valdocs, including an UNDO key) or by selecting a program from a menu the hotkey invoked. The keyboard is referred to as HASCI (Human Application Standard Computer Interface) after the user interface with the same name pioneered by Rising Star Industries.

Chris Rutkowski and Roger Amidon worked on the preliminary QX-10 design; Amidon continued designing software for the QX system after Epson and Rising Star Inc. stopped production. Graphic and other software for the QX-10 and QX-16 were developed by program designers such as Dan Oja and Nelson Donley. Rutkowski published articles on HASCI in BYTE in October and November 1982.
