= The Hooded Hawk Mystery =

Book by Franklin W. Dixon

- Original edition
- Author: Franklin W. Dixon (Charles S. Strong )
- Language: English
- Series: The Hardy Boys
- Genre: Detective, mystery
- Publisher: Grosset & Dunlap
- Publication date: January 1, 1954
- Publication place: United States
- Media type: Print (hardback & paperback)
- Pages: 192 pp
- Preceded by: The Yellow Feather Mystery
- Followed by: The Clue in the Embers

The Hooded Hawk Mystery is the thirty-fourth volume in the original The Hardy Boys series of mystery books for children and teens published by Grosset & Dunlap.

This book was written for the Stratemeyer Syndicate by Charles S. Strong and rewritten by Harriet Adams. The original version of this book was shortened in 1971 by Priscilla Baker-Carr resulting in two slightly different stories sharing the same title.

This version entered the Canadian Public Domain on January 1, 2013.

== Plot summary ==
The Hardy Boys solve a kidnapping and break up a gang smuggling illegal aliens from India who are also holding an Indian prince captive. An official of the Indian government saw to it that a trained peregrine falcon was delivered to the boys to use in their investigation. Throughout their mission the falcon intercepts many messages between the smugglers as the criminals use pigeons to fly messages from place to place.

Finally, the boys rescue the Indian prince and catch the human smugglers along with creating a strong bond between India and the Hardys.

== Online Availability ==
The Hooded Hawk Mystery Free Book Online
