= The Flickering Torch Mystery =

Book by Franklin W. Dixon

- Original edition
- Author: Franklin W. Dixon
- Language: English
- Series: The Hardy Boys
- Genre: Detective, mystery
- Publisher: Grosset & Dunlap
- Publication date: January 1, 1943
- Publication place: United States
- Media type: Print (hardback & paperback)
- Pages: 212 pp
- Preceded by: The Clue of the Broken Blade
- Followed by: The Melted Coins

The Flickering Torch Mystery is the twenty-second volume in the original The Hardy Boys series of mystery books for children and teens published by Grosset & Dunlap.

The book was written for the Stratemeyer Syndicate by Leslie McFarlane in 1943. Between 1959 and 1973 the first 38 volumes of the series were systematically revised as part of a project directed by Harriet Adams, Edward Stratemeyer's daughter. The original version of the book was rewritten in 1971 by Vincent Buranelli resulting in two different stories with the same title.

== Plot ==
=== Original edition ===
The boys investigate the mysterious disappearance of rare silkworms at a scientific research facility while working at an experimental farm during their summer vacation. The mystery deepens to include the theft of government building materials — a case being investigated by their famous father, Fenton.

=== Revised edition ===
When two suspicious plane accidents occur near Marlin Crag Airport, the two Hardy brothers investigate the case and find themselves in greater danger than they anticipated. Frank and Joe suspect an oil beacon near the airport caught the pilots off track. The boys go to fictional Pittville and visit Martin Weiss's parents. They get a clue about a dance place called The Flickering Torch. This involves investigating the Flickering Torch where a band seems to be involved in something shady. Their friend Chet Morton develops a new hobby of building airplanes; however, when he buys a used fuselage from an airplane junkyard it gets stolen from his farm. Ultimately the Hardys smash an illegal plot to make industrial diamonds using uranium isotopes from smuggled coal from the United Kingdom.

== Adaptation ==
The book was also adapted in 1977 as the episode "The Flickering Torch Mystery" for the 1977 Hardy Boys/Nancy Drew Mysteries TV series. The story was completely re-written, involving the Hardys' search for a missing sound engineer in an investigation that uncovers a plot to kill rock star Tony Eagle (played by Ricky Nelson). Unfortunately, they wrongly conclude it was to be attempted through a bomb placed on stage during a concert, and their desperate interruption of it to destructively search for the bomb turns out be an embarrassing fiasco that finds nothing. Later, they uncover the true method of the murder attempt, but no one believes them until they are forced to trust their instincts and stop Eagle's departure on his private plane. Once accomplished, they convince Eagle to allow a search of the plane and they discover not only the missing sound engineer tied up and hidden inside, but also a hidden radio transmitter designed to interfere with the plane's navigational equipment so the plane would go hopelessly off course and crash in the ocean when its fuel is exhausted. Some aspects of the book remained (the Hardys investigating the disappearance of a pilot), but one of the subplots, Frank & Joe having their own rock band and about to make their debut performance, was moved to another episode, "Mystery of the Flying Courier".
