= The Ghost at Skeleton Rock =

1958 book by Franklin W. Dixon

- Original edition
- Author: Franklin W. Dixon
- Language: English
- Series: The Hardy Boys
- Genre: Detective, mystery
- Publisher: Grosset & Dunlap
- Publication date: January 1, 1958
- Publication place: United States
- Media type: Print (hardback & paperback)
- Pages: 192 pp
- Preceded by: The Secret of Pirates' Hill
- Followed by: The Mystery at Devil's Paw

The Ghost at Skeleton Rock is the thirty-seventh volume in the original The Hardy Boys series of mystery books for children and teens published by Grosset & Dunlap.

This book was written for the Stratemeyer Syndicate by James Duncan Lawrence (who also wrote the majority of the Tom Swift Jr. series) in 1957. Between 1959 and 1973 the first 38 volumes of this series were systematically revised as part of a project directed by Harriet Adams, Edward Stratemeyer's daughter. The original version of this book was shortened in 1966 by Priscilla Baker-Carr resulting in two slightly different stories sharing the same title.

== Plot summary ==
Frank, Joe, Chet and Tony travel to Puerto Rico to investigate the mystery behind a coded letter they received from the Hardy father. They later go in a race against time to stop a criminal mastermind from using an atomic bomb to take over the government of the fictional country of Tropicale.
