= Compis =

Personal computer for educational settings

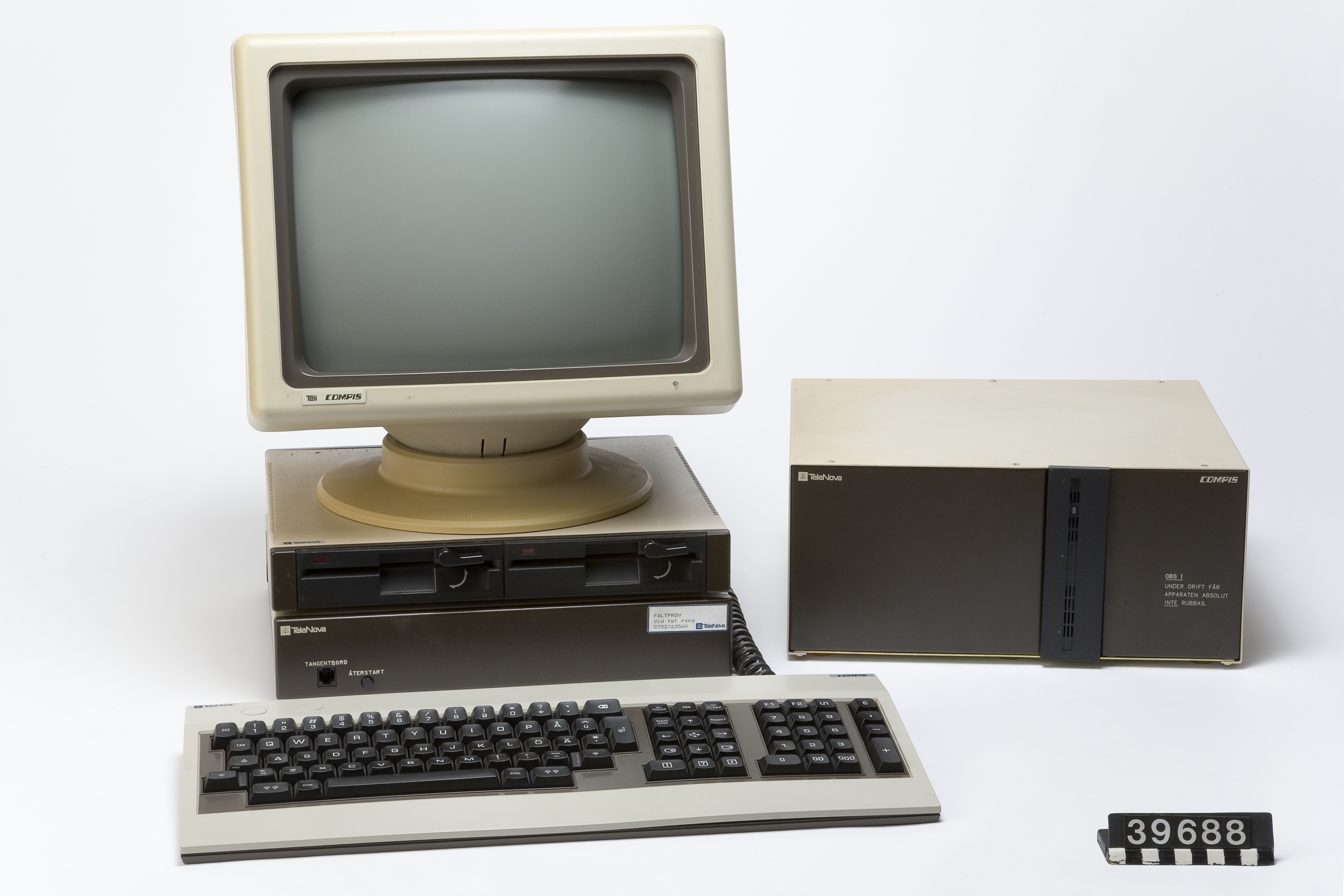
- An example Compis system, showing two 5.25-inch floppy disk drives, keyboard, monitor and external hard disk drive
- Also known as: Scandis (Norway, Denmark and Finland), COMPuter I Skolan
- Manufacturer: Svenska Datorer, TeleNova
- Released: 1984
- Discontinued: 1988
- Operating system: CP/M-86, MS-DOS
- CPU: Intel 80186 @ 8 MHz
- Memory: 128 KB (expandable to 256 KB)
- Removable storage: Floppy drives, tape recorder
- Display: 1280 x 800 monochrome, 640 x 400 in 8 colors, 640 x 400 monochrome
- Graphics: NEC 7220
- Input: Light pen
- Connectivity: Parallel port, RS-232C port

Compis (COMPuter I Skolan - "computer in school") was a computer system intended for the general educational system in Sweden and sold to Swedish schools beginning in 1984 through the distributor Esselte Studium, who also was responsible for the software packages.

The computers were also used in Danish, Finnish and Norwegian schools under the name Scandis.

== History ==
In 1980, the ABC 80 used in the schools was regarded as becoming obsolete, and the National Swedish Board for Technical Development (Styrelsen för teknisk utveckling) was tasked to find a replacement. In 1981, the procurement Tudis (Teknikupphandlingsprojekt Datorn i Skolan) was launched, and while the decision was controversial, Svenska Datorer AB was awarded the contract with development beginning in 1982. After Svenska Datorer went bankrupt, production was transferred to TeliDatorer/Telenova under Televerket (Sweden).

The computer was distributed by Esselte and exclusively marketed towards, and sold to, Swedish, Norwegian and Finnish schools, mainly high stage (year 7-9) and gymnasium-level. The Norwegian Ministry of Church and Education Affairs established a framework agreement for the procurement of the Scandis 128 and Tiki-100 systems for the country's school system.

The computer was based on the Intel 80186 CPU, fitted with 128 KB of RAM as standard, expandable to 256 KB, and used CP/M-86 as the operating system in ROM alongside a BASIC implementation. Display was driven by a NEC 7220 processor, and configurations included resolutions of 1280 x 800 pixels in monochrome and 640 x 400 in eight colours, these requiring an elevated 128 KB of video RAM, along with a more modest 640 x 400 in monochrome only requiring 32 KB of video RAM. Norwegian educational pricing for the base monochrome model was kr 5,800, rising to kr 6,800 for the higher-resolution or colour versions. Monitors added kr 1,800 or kr 3,800 for the high-resolution monochrome or colour models respectively. Disk drives also added upwards of kr 2,800 to the price. The machine could also run MS-DOS from disk. The computer had a wide selection of ports, including one for a light pen. The Compis project was criticized from the start, and when the move to IBM PC compatibility came, it was left behind and finally cancelled in 1988 although it was in use well into the 1990s.

== Applications ==
Notable applications being run on the Compis in an educational environment include:

- COMAL interpreter
- Turbo Pascal 3.0 compiler, under the name Scandis-Pascal
- WordStar word processor
- Harmony software: word processing, spreadsheet and database. The name was a pun on Lotus Symphony, the dominant productivity software at the time.

Some schools had simple local area networks of Compis/Scandis computers, in which 10–20 machines shared one hard disk with a typical capacity of 10 MB.

== See also ==
- Education in Sweden
- Unisys ICON
