= The Disappearing Floor =

Book by Franklin W. Dixon

- Original edition
- Author: Franklin W. Dixon
- Language: English
- Series: The Hardy Boys
- Genre: Detective, mystery
- Publisher: Grosset & Dunlap
- Publication date: May 1, 1940
- Publication place: United States
- Media type: Print (hardback & paperback)
- Pages: 192 pp
- Preceded by: The Twisted Claw
- Followed by: The Mystery of the Flying Express

The Disappearing Floor is the nineteenth volume in the original The Hardy Boys series of mystery books for children and teens published by Grosset & Dunlap.

This book was written for the Stratemeyer Syndicate by John Button in 1940. Between 1959 and 1973 the first 38 volumes of this series were systematically revised as part of a project directed by Harriet Adams, Edward Stratemeyer's daughter. The original version of this book was rewritten in 1964 by James D. Lawrence resulting in two different stories with the same title.

UK version published by William Collins Sons & Co. Ltd. as The Mystery of the Disappearing Floor, Volume 5, in 1971.

Because of Dr. John Button's death in 1967, The Disappearing Floor entered the Canadian Public Domain on January 1, 2017.

== Plot ==
=== Revised edition ===
The Hardy boys are asked by their father, Fenton Hardy, to assist him in solving a case involving a notorious jewel thief, Noel Strang, and his accomplices. Initially, they spot Strang's car and attempt to follow it until the car drops a purple smoke bomb and the Hardys are forced to pull over. While returning home from the car chase, they run into their friend Chet Morton who was in the woods rock collecting when he heard weird screams. When they go to investigate, they find a strangely tiled floor in the woods and nearby an injured man suddenly revives and runs off. Their adventure continues with a stolen amethyst, a bomb damaging their boat the Sleuth, and a savage looking hound which turns out to be an electrified scare device.

When Aunt Gertrude hears where the boys found Chet, she tells them that they were close to Old Man Perth's house where strange deaths have happened. The owner of the Perth Mansion, Jerome Perth, was a business tycoon who made many enemies due to his swindles. When he died his nephew, Clarence Perth, inherited the house. Shortly after moving in, the servants awoke during a night to him screaming and he was found on the floor of his bedroom with a fractured skull, saying "Th..the Floor!", before dying. The door and the windows of the room were all locked from the inside, so the mystery of how he died was never solved.

The Hardy boys identify a pilot who may be helping the thieves, so they walk into his hangar to examine his plane. Armed with a miniature camera, Joe snaps a picture of a map found in the plane. This leads them to a cabin hidden in the woods in a small bight named Tigers Bight. The boys don't have a chance to investigate the cabin as their family friend Jack Wayne crashes his plane Skyhappy Sal nearby and is injured. After rescuing Jack, the boys return to the Perth mansion where they find the jewel thieves hiding out and tricking a professor, Aden Darrow, into making a ‘freeze ray gun’ for them.

After more investigation, the Hardy boys manage to figure out that Clarence died by accident due to the 'disappearing floor' in his bedroom. The boys are captured before they can tell anyone, but luckily due to Strang's bragging, they are informed about how the gang has been using the freeze ray guns to stun security guards and steal the jewels. Strang explains how they rigged an elevator to go to the wrong floor where they had set up a fake office in order to receive a special shipment of diamonds without arousing any suspicion until they were safely away in the Haley Heist. Eventually Fenton Hardy reaches the Perth Mansion with the police and rescues his sons, arresting the thieves.

=== Original edition ===
The boys help bring a gang of bank robbers to justice.

== Adaptations ==
In the television series, The Hardy Boys/Nancy Drew Mysteries, the story is completely rewritten. In it, the boys are asked by their father to help him keep surveillance on an employee of a technology firm that hired him for a case. However, their participation is complicated when they follow him to an isolated property and are beset with a number of strange experiences, beginning with a UFO sighting, that make them doubt their senses.
