= The Mystery at Devil's Paw =

Book by Franklin W. Dixon

- Original edition
- Author: Franklin W. Dixon
- Language: English
- Series: Hardy Boys
- Genre: Detective, mystery
- Publisher: Grosset & Dunlap
- Publication date: January 1, 1959
- Publication place: United States
- Media type: Print (hardback & paperback)
- Pages: 192 pp
- ISBN: 0-448-08938-6
- OCLC: 802799
- LC Class: PZ7.D644 Mw5
- Preceded by: The Ghost at Skeleton Rock
- Followed by: The Mystery of the Chinese Junk

The Mystery at Devil's Paw is the thirty-eighth volume in the original The Hardy Boys series of mystery books for children and teens published by Grosset & Dunlap.

This book was written for the Stratemeyer Syndicate by James Duncan Lawrence (who also authored the majority of the Tom Swift Jr. series) in 1959. Between 1959 and 1973 the first 38 volumes of this series were systematically revised as part of a project directed by Harriet Adams, Edward Stratemeyer's daughter. The original version of this book was shortened in 1973 by Priscilla Baker-Carr resulting in two slightly different stories sharing the same title.

== Plot summary ==
Frank and Joe Hardy receive a telegram from their friend Tony saying that he is in danger in Alaska and needs their help. He also suggests bringing the brothers' friend, Chet Morton. At the airport they find a person following them and spying on them and they are attacked. Two mysterious figures leave them tied up and gagged underneath a pier to drown as the tide comes in. Later, after they are rescued, the police discover that the attacker was a wanted spy: Romo Stransky.

Arriving in Alaska, they meet Ted Sewell, Tony's helper, and he leads the boys to Tony's camp. During the trip, Ted tells the boys about how his father disappeared and he wants them to help him find him.

At camp, Tony tells the boys that they have been attacked several times by a gang. During a search of the island, they find a knapsack, a map and a piece of jade. They later learn of a gang member going to The Devil's Paw — a place in British Columbia.

At The Devil's Paw they learn of an ancient Indian burial site where people would steal gold and jewelry. The brothers remember the piece of jade they found in the knapsack, and think it might have been stolen from the burial site. They locate the ancient burial site and also find Ted Sewell's father.

They find the camp of the gang and learn that the mysterious gang was searching for a lost rocket. They are captured, but escape with the help of their friend Chet. A radio call to the infantry leads to the arrest of the gang.
