= The Secret of Wildcat Swamp =

Book by Franklin W. Dixon

- Original edition
- Author: Franklin W. Dixon
- Language: English
- Series: The Hardy Boys
- Genre: Detective, mystery
- Publisher: Grosset & Dunlap
- Publication date: January 1, 1952
- Publication place: United States
- Media type: Print (hardback & paperback)
- Pages: 192 pp
- Preceded by: The Wailing Siren Mystery
- Followed by: The Crisscross Shadow

The Secret of Wildcat Swamp is the thirty-first volume in the original The Hardy Boys series of mystery books for children and teens published by Grosset & Dunlap.

This book was written for the Stratemeyer Syndicate by William Dougherty in 1952. Between 1959 and 1973 the first 38 volumes of this series were systematically revised as part of a project directed by Harriet Adams, Edward Stratemeyer's daughter. The original version of this book was shortened in 1969 by Priscilla Baker-Carr resulting in two slightly different stories sharing the same title.

== Plot summary ==
An invitation from Cap Bailey, science teacher at Bayport High, to accompany him out West to Wildcat Swamp on an archaeological expedition triggers off a series of dangerous events for Frank and Joe Hardy. On their way West the boys and Cap have a near-fatal accident in a private plane which has been sabotaged. Though warned to leave the area, Frank, Joe, and Cap doggedly remain until they have caught both of the cunning ex-convicts they are up against in this swift-paced adventure.

They are attacked and kidnapped multiple times. Cap and Chet are investigating a cave when they are grabbed by Willie and one of his henchmen. The two men overpower then and leave them tied up in a cave. Later they return to gag them and tie them up more tightly.

Meanwhile, Frank and Joe are searching for others of the gang when two of the men ambush them in a canyon. The Hardys are caught completely by surprise and are overpowered. The men tie them up and gag them, and leave them in a cold train car to freeze. The Hardys manage to escape, and find the cave where Cap and Chet are imprisoned, setting them free. In the climax, the boys are caught once again and tied up, left bound to a rock formation, but are eventually rescued.
