= Gordon Grant (artist) =

American painter

- Born: June 7, 1875; San Francisco, California, U.S.
- Died: May 7, 1962 (aged 86); Manhattan, New York City, U.S.
- Occupation: Artist

Gordon Hope Grant (June 7, 1875 – May 7, 1962) was an American artist, well-known for his maritime watercolors, and his work with the American Boy Scouts. He was born in San Francisco in 1875, and died in 1962.

His best known work is likely his watercolor of the USS Constitution. He also produced war time posters during World War I, illustrations for books such as Penrod, magazine covers for periodicals, such as Saturday Evening Post, and illustrations for Boys' Life. He was the cover designer for the first edition of the Boy Scout Handbook in 1911.

He was illustrator for The Story of American Sailing Ships by Charles S. Strong, The Scarlet Plague by Jack London, Eternal Sea: An Anthology of Sea Poetry edited by William Martin Williamson and many other works.

He was a member of the Association of American Artists and many of his prints were sold through it.
