= James Duncan Lawrence (author) =

American children's author

- Born: October 22, 1918; Detroit, Michigan, U.S.
- Died: March 19, 1994 (aged 75)
- Occupation: Writer
- Writing career
- Pen name: Victor Appleton; Franklin W. Dixon; Jack Lancer; Hunter Adams; Max Walker
- Period: 1941–1986
- Genre: Children's literature
- Notable work: Tom Swift

James Duncan Lawrence (October 22, 1918 – March 19, 1994), best known as Jim Lawrence, was an American author best known for authoring most of the Tom Swift Jr. series of books (under the pseudonym Victor Appleton II) and the "Friday Foster" comic strip, as well as the James Bond newspaper strip.

== Biography ==
Lawrence was born in Detroit, Michigan in 1918. He fought in the International Brigades in the Spanish Civil War.

As a freelance writer in the late 1940s and early 1950s, he wrote scripts for a number of radio shows, including The Green Hornet and Sergeant Preston of the Yukon.

In the 1950s and 1960s, he worked for the Stratemeyer Syndicate on a number of series (listed in the Bibliography).

He briefly wrote the "Doctor Strange" feature in Strange Tales #162–166 (Nov. 1967–March 1968) and wrote several Captain Britain stories in 1977.

In the 1970s, he worked for the Chicago Tribune and the New York News Syndicate with illustrator Jordi Longarón on the "Friday Foster" comic strip.

Later in his career, Lawrence co-wrote two Infocom interactive fiction games with Stu Galley: Seastalker (1984) and Moonmist (1986).

Lawrence died in Summit, New Jersey in 1994.

== Bibliography ==
=== Tom Swift Jr. series ===
He wrote the following books in the Tom Swift Jr. series under the Stratemeyer Syndicate house pseudonym Victor Appleton II:

- Tom Swift and His Atomic Earth Blaster (1954)
- Tom Swift and His Outpost in Space (1955)/1977 reissue title: …And His Sky Wheel
- Tom Swift and His Diving Seacopter (1956)
- Tom Swift on the Phantom Satellite (1956)
- Tom Swift and His Ultrasonic Cycloplane (1957)
- Tom Swift and His Deep Sea Hydrodome (1958)
- Tom Swift in the Race to the Moon (1958)
- Tom Swift and Space Solartron (1958)
- Tom Swift and His Electronic Retroscope (1959)/1972 Reissue Title: …In The Jungle of the Mayas
- Tom Swift and His Spectromarine Selector (1960)
- Tom Swift and the Cosmic Astronauts (1960)
- Tom Swift and the Visitor from Planet X (1961)
- Tom Swift and the Electronic Hydrolung (1961)
- Tom Swift and His Triphibian Atomicar (1962)
- Tom Swift and His Megascope Space Prober (1962)
- Tom Swift and the Asteroid Pirates (1963)
- Tom Swift and His Repelatron Skyway (1963)
- Tom Swift and His Aquatomic Tracker (1964)
- Tom Swift and His 3-D Telejector (1964)
- Tom Swift and His Polar-Ray Dynasphere (1965)
- Tom Swift and His Sonic Boom Trap (1965)
- Tom Swift and His Subocean Geotron (1966)
- Tom Swift and the Mystery Comet (1966)
- Tom Swift and the Captive Planetoid (1967)

=== Hardy Boys series ===
He revised the following books in the Hardy Boys series under the Stratemeyer Syndicate house pseudonym Franklin W. Dixon:

- The Mystery at Devil's Paw (1959)
- A Figure in Hiding (1965)
- The Secret Warning (1966)
- The Disappearing Floor (1964)
- The Sting of the Scorpion (1979)

=== Nancy Drew series ===
He wrote the following books in the Nancy Drew series under the Stratemeyer Syndicate house pseudonym Carolyn Keene:

- Race Against Time (1982)
- Clue of the Ancient Disguise (1982)
- The Silver Cobweb (1983)
- The Haunted Carousel (1983)
- Enemy Match (1984)
- The Mysterious Image (1984)
- The Bluebeard Room (1985)
- The Phantom of Venice (1985)

=== Christopher Cool series ===
He wrote the following books in the Christopher Cool series under the Stratemeyer Syndicate house pseudonym Jack Lancer:

- X Marks the Spy (1967)
- Mission: Moonfire (1967)
- Department of Danger (1967)
- Ace of Shadows (1967)
- Heads You Lose (1968)
- Trial by Fury (1969)

=== Binky Brothers series ===
Along with Leonard P. Kessler, he wrote the following books in the Binky Brothers series:

- Binky Brothers, Detectives (1968)
- Binky Brothers and the Fearless Four (1970)

=== Man From Planet X series ===
Writing as Hunter Adams, he wrote the following books in the Man From Planet X series:

- Man From Planet X: The She-Beast (1975)
- Man From Planet X: Tiger by the Tail (1975)
- Man From Planet X: The Devil to Pay (1975)

=== Dark Angel series ===
The Dark Angel books all featured cover art by Lawrence's Friday Foster collaborator, Jorge Longarón.

- The Dream Girl Caper (1975)
- The Emerald Oil Caper (1975)
- The Gilded Snatch Caper (1975)
- The Godmother Caper (1975)

=== Mission: Impossible series ===
Lawrence wrote two original novels based on TV series, both under the pseudonym Max Walker:

- Mission: Impossible #2: Code Name: Judas (1968)
- Mission: Impossible #3: Code Name: Rapier (1968)

=== James Bond comic strip ===
In 1969, he took over as the writer for the James Bond syndicated comic strip.

Among the titles were:

- The Man with the Golden Gun (1966)
- Octopussy (1966)
- The Spy Who Loved Me (1967)

The complete list is given in James Bond comic strips.
