= The Melted Coins =

1944 book by Franklin W. Dixon

- Original edition
- Author: Franklin W. Dixon
- Language: English
- Series: The Hardy Boys
- Genre: Detective, mystery
- Publisher: Grosset & Dunlap
- Publication date: February 1, 1944
- Publication place: United States
- Media type: Print (hardback & paperback)
- Pages: 180 pp
- Preceded by: The Flickering Torch Mystery
- Followed by: The Short-Wave Mystery

The Melted Coins is the twenty-third volume in the original The Hardy Boys series of mystery books for children and teens published by Grosset & Dunlap.

This book was written for the Stratemeyer Syndicate by Leslie McFarlane in 1944. Between 1959 and 1973 the first 38 volumes of this series were systematically revised as part of a project directed by Harriet Adams, Edward Stratemeyer's daughter. The original version of this book was rewritten in 1970 by Andrew E. Svenson resulting in two different stories with the same title.

== Plot ==
=== Revised edition ===
Frank and Joe Hardy become suspicious when their friend Chet Morton enrolls in a summer school that sounds too good to be true. While investigating a burglary at the Seneca Indian Reservation in New York State, they also investigate the nearby Zoar College. Their sleuthing leads them to believe that there is a connection between the professors of this fictional college and the theft of a tribal mask titled Spoon Mouth. This mask was created when some melted coins happened to look like a sacred Indian image. Now it is missing and the boys' investigation proves to be dangerous; however, they successfully recover the mask and capture the thieves.

=== Original edition ===
A case involving counterfeit money, buried treasure, and the Curse of the Caribees, Frank and Joe solve the mystery of the Melted Coins and help shut down both a local counterfeiting ring and a much larger operation dealing in stolen gold.
