= Sorcerer (video game) =

1984 video game

- Developer: Infocom
- Publisher: Infocom
- Designer: Steve Meretzky
- Engine: Z-machine
- Platforms: Amiga, Amstrad CPC, Amstrad PCW, Apple II, Atari 8-bit, Atari ST, Commodore 64, CP/M, DEC Rainbow, MS-DOS, IBM PC, Kaypro II, Classic Mac OS, NEC APC, Osborne 1, RT-11, TI-99/4A, TRS-80.
- Release: Release 4: January 31, 1984 Release 6: May 8, 1984; Release 13: October 21, 1985; Release 15: November 8, 1985 Release 18: September 4, 1986
- Genre: Interactive fiction
- Mode: Single-player

Sorcerer is an interactive fiction game written by Steve Meretzky and released by Infocom in 1984. It is the second game in the magic-themed "Enchanter trilogy", preceded by Enchanter and followed by Spellbreaker. It is Infocom's eleventh game.

== Plot ==
Following the unlikely defeat of Krill in Enchanter, the player's character has progressed from an Apprentice Enchanter to earning a coveted seat in the Circle of Enchanters. Belboz the Necromancer, the leader of the Circle, has become not only a mentor but a close friend as well. Lately, Belboz has seemed different, distracted, even talking to himself at length. Whatever he's dealing with, Belboz doesn't see fit to confide in anyone, then suddenly he disappears.

== Gameplay ==
Potions are used by drinking them and each can only be used once. Sorcerer has 70 ways for the player to die.

== Release ==
The Sorcerer package includes the following physical items:

- A copy of the fictitious magazine Popular Enchanting featuring a profile of Belboz
- An "Infotater", a paper code wheel disguised as information about creatures in the game. The Infotater was found in the original package only. When the game was later re-released in the "gray stripe" box format, the Infotater was replaced by a "Field Guide to the Creatures of Frobozz" brochure containing the same information. Consequently, original Infotaters are highly sought after by collectors. The Field Guide or Infotater is necessary to open the chest and acquire its contents in the game.

== Reception ==
St.Game stated that "The world of the Sorcerer is rich in detail and wonderment. The magical experiences resemble the exotic adventures of Carlos Castaneda", with "several diabolical traps and puzzles", and concluded that "The final solution is like a delicate orchid achieving full bloom. Long after the game is over, the heady fragrance stays with you". PC Magazine gave Sorcerer 10.5 points out of 12. It noted the dramatic opening and the game's "predisposition against violence", offering the player spells instead of weapons. Zzap!64 noted the high (£45.30) British price of the game and necessity to own a disk drive, but called it "a tremendous challenge and full of surprises ... lengthy location descriptions, great atmosphere, and highly addictive qualities".
