= Friday Foster =

American comic strip

- Friday Foster, the title character of the comic strip
- Author: Jim Lawrence; Jorge Longarón
- Current status/schedule: Concluded daily & Sunday strip
- Launch date: January 18, 1970
- End date: February 17, 1974
- Syndicate(s): Chicago Tribune Syndicate
- Publisher: Dell Comics
- Genre: Soap opera

Friday Foster is an American newspaper comic strip, created and written by Jim Lawrence and illustrated by Jorge Longarón. It ran from January 18, 1970, to February 17, 1974 and was notable for featuring one of the first African-American women as the title character in a comic strip. Jackie Ormes' Torchy Brown predated it, although it saw a more limited release in the Afro-American newspaper Pittsburgh Courier.

== History ==
Jim Lawrence had been the writer of the London Daily Express comic strip, James Bond, when he became interested in creating a comic about a black character. Spanish cartoonist Jorge Longarón was chosen as the illustrator, and the strip was syndicated by the Chicago Tribune Syndicate. The comic focused on the glamorous life of its title character, a former fashion model who became an assistant to a top fashion photographer, as described by comics historian Dave Karlen:

Starting out as an assistant to high-fashion photographer Shawn North, Friday after learning the ropes, eventually moved in front of the camera to become a world traveling supermodel leaving her troubled life in Harlem behind her. Early on, Lawrence's story lines had a harder edge showing the contrast of Friday's family with her street-wise brother trying to accept her newfound success in the world of magazine publishing. But soon its episodes changed focus to showcase more soap-opera thrills of romance and travel for the gorgeous African-American. Hong Kong, Paris, London, and even Africa were all shown with equal flair from the detailed artistic masterpieces produced by Longarón from his home in Barcelona.

A 1970 issue of Jet reported on the debut of Friday Foster. The magazine stated that writer Lawrence lived in Summit, New Jersey and illustrator Longarón lived in Spain. Lawrence, a veteran of the International Brigades in the Spanish Civil War had specifically sought a Spanish illustrator for the strip, at least in part because at the time Spanish illustrators were much cheaper than comparably skilled American illustrators. The two communicated via postal mail and telephone calls.

Because of the slow speed of the mail, Longarón mailed his drawings three weeks before they were scheduled to appear. Still, the drawings sometimes did not arrive on time, and artist Frank Springer did a small amount of uncredited work on the strip, recalling in the mid-2000s, "I knew the writer, who lived here in New Jersey, ... [and] I got a call a couple of times from Lawrence who said they hadn't gotten the material through from Spain" and asked Springer to fill in. "I guess over the years I did two Sunday pages, maybe three."

Longarón, from Barcelona, had never been in New York until he made a brief trip there to sign the contract to do the comic. Even then, he never actually set foot in Harlem, though he did pass through it taking photos from a taxi for future reference. He drew the comic using a technique he had already established, with a sharpened pencil dipped in ink. He worked in part from photographs. He based Friday's general appearance on a particular African American model from Playboy, but also used his own mother and aunt (both artists themselves) as models.

Dell Comics published a single issue of a Friday Foster comic book (October 1972), written by Joe Gill and illustrated by Jack Sparling.

In 1975, Friday Foster was adapted into a blaxploitation feature film of the same name, starring Pam Grier.

In September 2019, the Friday Foster character appeared in a Dick Tracy story drawn by Andrew Pepoy.

The comic was the subject of a temporary exhibit "Longaron i Friday Foster. L'heroïna inesperada" which ran from 20 March 2024 through 24 June 2024 at the Museu Nacional d'Art de Catalunya in Barcelona.

== See also ==
- Friday Foster (film)
