= NEC APC character set =

Character set developed by NEC

NEC APC is an 8-bit character set developed by NEC for the NEC APC, a CP/M-86 and MS-DOS-compatible personal computer in 1983. These were a contemporary competitor for the IBM PC, although eclipsed by fully PC-compatible computers.

== Character set ==
NEC APC character set
	0	1	2	3	4	5	6	7	8	9	A	B	C	D	E	F
0x	NUL	▶	⏩︎	📖	EOT	⍰	🆗	🔔	⬆	➡	◇	⬇	FF	⬅	🯅	SI
1x	DLE	DC1	¯	−	÷	×	🕜︎	▯	▮	▬	SUB	ESC	FS	GS	RS	▭
2x	SP	!	"	#	$	%	&	'	(	)	*	+	,	–	.	/
3x	0	1	2	3	4	5	6	7	8	9	:	;	<	=	>	?
4x	@	A	B	C	D	E	F	G	H	I	J	K	L	M	N	O
5x	P	Q	R	S	T	U	V	W	X	Y	Z	[	\	]		_
6x	`	a	b	c	d	e	f	g	h	i	j	k	l	m	n	o
7x	p	q	r	s	t	u	v	w	x	y	z	{	|	}	~	DEL
8x	▁	▂	▃	▄	▅	▆	▇	█	▏	▎	▍	▌	▋	▊	▉	┼
9x	┴	┬	├	┤	🭷	─	│	🭵	┌	┐	└	┘	╭	╮	╰	╯
Ax	NBSP	≥	⋅	∗	≤	∕	˙	↑	½	↓	←	→	+	(	)	¼
Bx	∞	³	τ	⁴	⁵	⁶	ε	ρ	σ	ψ	Ω	Γ	⁰	ο	κ	Σ
Cx	α	ν	Δ	β	ξ	η	θ	¹	±	υ	π	∧	²	⊕	¯	-
Dx	¢	ω	≈	γ	⁷	⁸	⁹	ι	φ	≠	χ	°	�	ζ	λ	μ
Ex	═	╞	╪	╡	◢	◣	◥	◤	♠	♥	♦	♣	●	○	╱	╲
Fx	╳	┈	┊	�	�	�	�	�	⌠	⌡	⎡	⎣	⎤	⎦	⎲	⎳

� Not in Unicode, these are combinations of solid and dotted box lines and a mirror-image phi

== See also ==
- NEC PC-9800 series
