= The Twisted Claw =

1939 book by Franklin W. Dixon

- Original edition
- Author: Franklin W. Dixon
- Language: English
- Series: The Hardy Boys
- Genre: Detective, mystery
- Publisher: Grosset & Dunlap
- Publication date: March 1, 1939
- Publication place: United States
- Media type: Print (hardback & paperback)
- Pages: 172 pp
- Preceded by: The Secret Warning
- Followed by: The Disappearing Floor

The Twisted Claw is the eighteenth volume in the original The Hardy Boys series of mystery books for children and teens published by Grosset & Dunlap.

This book was written for the Stratemeyer Syndicate by John Button in 1939. Between 1959 and 1973 the first 38 volumes of this series were systematically revised as part of a project directed by Harriet Adams, Edward Stratemeyer's daughter. The original version of this book was rewritten in 1969 by Tom Mulvey resulting in two different stories with the same title.

Because of Dr. John Button's death in 1967 (Canadian Copyright for "Works for Hire" uses the author's life plus 50 years for term length), The Twisted Claw (1939) entered the Canadian Public Domain on January 1, 2017.

== Plot summary (revised edition) ==
While their father Fenton Hardy is working on cases of museum robberies, he asks Frank and Joe to stake out the Black Parrot, a shipping boat docked in Bayport. The Hardy boys get a job loading crates aboard the ship but because the crew is so unfriendly and the boys are kept very busy, they don't have a chance to investigate. They instead decide to follow another lead and travel to New York to search for a rare old book. While scouring a used book store, they locate a book titled Empire of the Twisted Claw which bears a symbol on the cover which matches a ring the first mate of the Black Parrot was wearing. While they cannot afford to purchase the book, the store keeper allows them to read it, whereby they learn about the Empire of the Twisted Claw and the pirate ships named Black Parrot and Yellow Parrot and the King who controlled the empire.

As the investigation continues, the Boys and their father learn that the thieves are targeting the DeGraw collection and will likely rob six more museums. They stand guard at one of the museums but when the thieves strike, they use a sleeping gas knocking the boys out. Following up on a lead, they find where the Black Parrot has docked again and watch while the crew loads about a dozen logs on board and the ship immediately leaves port. The Hardy boys then track down the Yellow Parrot where they take jobs to get aboard and look around. While investigating more of these strange logs in the storeroom, the logs break free and Frank must hang from the roof to avoid being crushed.

When they learn that the Yellow Parrot is going to meet up with the Black Parrot, the boys realize that they must escape. They jump ship and swim to a strange island where they meet an odd man who lives on that island. They escape the island by hitching a ride with a pilot who is a friend of the island man, and then they can return home. Later, they receive a radio call from someone on the Yellow Parrot who is trying to help them. The boys fly to the source of the signal and find the ship hidden near the strange island. At first, they are captured but managed to escape while learning why the crooks desire the DeGraw collection, and capture the masterminds behind the robberies.

== Plot summary (original edition) ==
Famous detective Fenton Hardy informs his sons, Frank and Joe, that a clever, dangerous gang of smugglers is operating in their part of the country and the government must defeat it. He may need their help, in a hurry, and reminds them of the secret code he has given them which he will use to summon them quickly if need be. Frank and Joe do not tell him that Frank's wallet, containing the code, has been lost.

In the meantime he asks the boys to search for an out of print book on criminology.

As Fenton packs to depart on his mission, Frank notices that the house is under surveillance. Fenton takes his departure in disguise so that he won't be followed. Soon after he leaves, an attempt is made to break into the house, but Frank and Joe scare off the intruder.

The next day they go out in search of the criminology book their father asked them to find. They find it in a used book store and also run across a curious volume called Fifty Thousand Dead Men, by a pirate captain. They head home with both books.

At home they receive a call from a stranger, one Pierre, who has an exaggerated French Canadian accent, claiming to represent their father and demanding the delivery of his papers to a seedy bar in the water front district. There follows several attempts by Pierre to trick the boys into turning over their father's papers, including the use of the secret code after Frank's wallet is mysteriously returned. As each attempt is countered, the boys follow Pierre back to a tramp schooner, the Black Parrot, being loaded for departure. After surveying the ship and overhearing a sailor report that he had gotten the papers, they head back home.

At home, they find their Aunt and the housekeeper tied up and their father's papers stolen. Remembering the comments they overheard on the Black Parrot regarding “the papers”, they hurry to the ship, only to find it has departed. They give chase in their speedboat, but run out of gas and the schooner gets away. Interrogating the clerk at the shipping office gives them little to go on except the vague information that the Black Parrot often plies the logging camps along the Canadian coast.

Back home again, the boys’ mother returns from a trip and relates to them a strange message from their father that was received by the hotel clerk. Using the code sheet, Frank and Joe determine that the message mentions “fishing boat” and instructs them to go to the Canadian woods. They conclude that their father has been kidnapped and was only able to leave an incomplete message. They resolve to travel to the Canadian woods, explore around the lumbering camps to find their father and maybe the Black Parrot. They leave their friend, Chet, to watch over and protect the household.

On the train Frank reads the pirate book and discovers that the pirate, one Captain Gronger, has a pet parrot that broke his leg and ended up with a twisted claw. The pirate captain adopts a twisted claw as his insignia.

Once in Canada they travel into the woods to a lumber town, Woodsville, on the outskirts of the lumber country. Arriving at night, they check into a rustic boarding house / hotel and are assigned a room to be shared with two other boarders. Upon encountering the Hardys, the two boarders are immediately startled and they bolt and run. The Hardys give chase but the two get away. One of them resembles the intruder they confronted back home.

Subsequent inquiries reveal that the larger of the two is young Jim Hoskin, the arrogant, boastful, ne’er-do-well son of old Jim Hoskin. Setting out for old Jim Hoskin's cabin, they encounter and confront young Jim and his shorter companion, a sailor. After a brief fight, the two get away again.

Waiting until dark to reconnoiter, Joe heads out alone, while Frank gets some more sleep. In the dark a car silently coasts through the village, its engine cut. Joe jumps onto the back and hangs on in order to follow the suspects. While hanging on, he hears Jim and the sailor gripe about Pierre, who acts as if he were the Claw King himself. When the car hits a bump, Joe is injured and is discovered. The two tie him to a log at the top of a log jam in a river, so when the jam is cleared he will be swept away and crushed to death.

Awaking, and realizing that Joe has been gone far too long, Frank sets out to find him. Following his foot prints and then the car's tire tracks, he comes to where Joe was captured. He hears Joe crying for help, and rescues him from the log jam in the nick of time. Stumbling across a nearby lumber camp, they receive food and medical attention. One of the men identifies Jim Hoskin's companion as Slim Wetzel.

Back at the hotel, they call home to their friend Chet, who has been watching over the house in their absence. He tells them another attempt was made to break in, and when he dusted for fingerprints, one of them looked like a claw.

They decide to press deeper into the lumber country and make the rounds of all the lumber camps in order to find their father. On horseback, they head to a neighboring village. From a couple of locals they learn that Young Jim and Slim Wetzel had been in the area trying to obtain sleeping powder to take care of a “maniac” in their company. The “maniac”, lying in the back seat of the car, was moaning and raving something about “frogs climb double trees”.

The Hardy's suspect the “maniac” is their father, feigning craziness and trying to convey a message through the code. Consulting the code, they determine that the police should raid some place in the woods, but the code does not provide a translation for “double trees”. They surmise it to be a reference to a lumber camp name and find a “Twin Spruce Camp” nearby on their map. They head for the camp.

Near the camp they are attacked by a large wolf-dog. After fending off the attack, they observe a man dragging the wolf-dog into a cabin. They suspect that their father is being held prisoner there. They decide to call on the Canadian Mounted Police for assistance and ride to the nearby headquarters. Sergeant Johnson tells them that the camp has been closed for four years and no-one should be there. At a gallop, all three ride back to the camp.

As they sneak up on the cabin, they are again attacked by the wolf-dog, but Sergeant Johnson uses a weighted net to trap and dispatch it. Breaking into the cabin they discover and confront Young Jim and Slim Wetzel. Overcoming them, they tie them up, and the Sergeant leaves with the men, leaving Frank and Joe to guard the cabin until he returns.

Exploring, Joe discovers a hidden room upstairs, and breaking into it, discovers his father in very poor condition, too weak even to talk. They provide their father a stimulant, and Frank relates that while Sergeant Johnson was tying up the prisoners, he noticed that they both had twisted claws branded on the tips of their index fingers.

Fenton relates the story of his capture just after leaving the message the boys received from their mother and how he feigned being delirious and used his ranting to try to convey a message to them. As they talk, they notice that the forest around them is on fire, and that they are trapped.

As the fire closes in on the cabin, all hope of escape seems cut off. Suddenly, a charging horse and rider burst through the wall of flames, and Sergeant Johnson dismounts. He quickly gives them direction on how to direct their horses through the fire and straps Fenton to his mount. After penetrating the firestorm safely, they head back to the village. At the village, Fenton receives medical attention.

They decide to give Chet another call for an update. Chet tells them that while investigating the Black Parrot, he has found out that there are a number of Parrot boats, each named with a different color. Frank concludes that the smuggling gang has read the pirate book they picked up, and have been using it as a guide.

Fenton summons the boys and tells them that Sergeant Johnson overheard the prisoners discussing a boat named the Black Parrot due to dock at a small port town, Little Cove. Fenton directs them ship out on the boat in order to solve the case. They travel to Little Cove.

In Little Cove they find that the Black Parrot has not yet arrived. They then spy Pierre, and follow him back to a large house. In the morning they procure seaman's clothing as a disguise, and binoculars. They stake out Pierre's house and, using the binoculars, are able to distinguish a claw mark on his index finger.

The next morning, the Black Parrot arrives and Frank and Joe head to the water front in their disguises to sign up for the crew. As luck would have it, when the boys approach the first mate he has just fired two rowdy crew members and hires them on the spot. They report to the ship the next morning and are put to work right away. In the course of their labor, Frank observes the twisted claw print on the Captain's finger and Joe overhears the Captain and Pierre say that they are sailing to King Barracuda's Island for a meeting of all the King's subjects from the world over.

Joe notices that the Captain is an enthusiast for solitaire card games and manages to engage him with new games and strategies. Frank cozies up to “Sparks” the radio operator. Joe gets the opportunity to covertly search the Captain's cabin and finds one of his father's missing papers. A note scribbled on it reports that Jim Hoskin had put Fenton out of the way, and was signed by Pierre.

The crew notice that the Hardys have been trying to get friendly with the officers and confront them. One of them sarcastically mentions that Joe has been doing card tricks for the Captain. Impulsively, Joe demands a card deck and starts performing impromptu magic tricks. The crew is astonished and entertained by Joe's feats of prestidigitation and they win the crew over.

The crew asks the boys to do them a favor and to try to find out from the Captain where the ship is headed. They have observed signs of bad luck and doom, and believe that only by getting to land soon will they break the spell. Frank promises to ask the Captain and let them know. When they observe Pierre going to the Captain's cabin, they eavesdrop and hear the Captain tell him they will make Barracuda Island six days off. But before they can report back, the crew mutinies and locks the Captain and other officers in the brig.

Frank and Joe take the opportunity to search Pierre's cabin and find a report that details an amazing record of world-wide smuggling activities. The boys realize that if the mutiny is successful they will not be able to get to Barracuda Island and break the smuggling ring. They resolve to stop the mutiny.

A ferocious storm arises; the mutineers squabble amongst themselves and prove incapable of handling the situation. The ship is near sinking and chaos reigns. In the confusion, Frank get the key to the brig and frees the officers. They quickly take charge and the crew, fearing death, follows orders and fights to save the ship. In the end, the ship suffers heavy damage but survives, and the Captain is again in full control. The leaders of the mutiny are rounded up and locked in the brig.

A few days later, the ship makes landfall at Barracuda Island, but the crew are disappointed to learn that they are strictly forbidden from going ashore. After the Captain, Pierre, and a few officers depart, the Hardys slip overboard and swim ashore.

On the island they encounter a resident and are nearly exposed, but they convince him to keep their presence a secret. From him we learn that the island consists of three classes: an indigenous population of brown-skinned, loincloth-clad “natives”; a European population that are descendants of shipwreck survivors who are largely ignorant of the “outside world” and of the smuggling activities; and a ruling class led by the Barracuda King, which conducts various illegal enterprises around the world.

The boys blend into the population and observe various festivities associated with arrival of the fleet for the yearly meeting with the King. They learn that there will be a parade that will welcome and escort the Captains and officers of each ship to the King's castle where they will report on their activities and receive recognition for their successes. The Hardys use the general commotion as the parade advances towards the castle to slip past the gate and gain entrance to the castle. Cautiously exploring, the secrete themselves in an empty chamber with a balcony overlooking the audience hall and the King's throne.

From their hiding place, they witness the induction of the new recruits into the “Order of the Twisted Claw”. Each initiate has the twisted claw insignia ceremonially branded on his forefinger with a poker heated in a cauldron of boiling oil.

The King is then ready to accept the reports from each of the ship's crews, but first severely questions Pierre and the Captain concerning the absence of Young Jim and Slim, and are even threatened with death for having allowed them to disappear and thus endanger the Order. Pierre lies and tells the King they were badly burned in the forest fire. The King reserves judgment until he hears their report.

When it is their turn, Pierre and the Captain astound the gathering with the scope of their smuggling activities and their profitability. They provide details of how they use hollow logs and false papers to smuggle luxury goods into the United States and turn a profit on them. The King forgives the disappearance of Young Jim and Slim, and awards them the grand prize, a large chest of gold coins.

The Hardys have seen enough and sneak out of the castle and swim back to the ship. Their absence had been noted by the officer in charge, but they make up a tall tale about taking a swim and being attacked by barracudas. The credulous crew backs them up in their story and is entertained by the boys as they elaborate on their adventure.

“Sparks”, the radio operator, prevails upon Frank to help him fix the wireless outfit; Frank winds a new coil and gets it working. The Captain and Pierre return to the ship, and in a chance encounter with him, Pierre eyes them suspiciously. The boys suspect they have been recognized, and as precaution, Frank tells Sparks that the coil needs more work and disconnects it. Shortly after, Pierre confronts them and has them tossed into the brig.

The brothers decide that their only hope is to play on the crew's resentment towards the Captain and incite another mutiny. They find out that the Captain has rationed some of the gold coins to the men and so they are not going to turn against him. Changing tactics, Joe plays on their superstitious nature and tells one of the crew that the Captain is going to kill them, which will curse the ship and it will sink, drowning all aboard. The terrified seaman rushes to tell the rest of the crew. He returns and informs them that the crew is afraid of being punished and won't engage in a second uprising. Just then, one of the officers appears and herds them to the Captain's cabin. As a last desperate chance, the boys raise a commotion yelling out “Don’t kill us!”. The crew, eavesdropping outside, becomes fearful, breaks down the cabin door, and removes the Captain, Pierre and the officers to the brig.

Now free, the brothers see their chance to use the wireless to summon help. Sparks feigns ignorance of the situation and requests that the coil be restored. Frank seems to oblige, and as soon as Sparks thinks the radio is fixed, he turns on them and attempts to summon the other Parrot ships to put down the mutiny. But Frank only pretended to comply and the radio does not function. The crew imprison Sparks in the brig.

With the radio fixed, the Hardys attempt to summon help, but a storm arises and the static makes it impossible to know if their messages are getting through. After repeated attempts to relay a message, the radio gives out without receiving any reply.

One of the crew informs them that they have decided to change course and head for the Mediterranean in order to avoid prosecution for mutiny, and are even considering freeing the Captain, who has promised to double their money and make sure they are not punished. Just then, the lookout on the mast spots a ship steaming towards them. The radio messages got through and it is a U.S. revenue cutter. A shot is fired across the bow and a boarding crew takes over the ship. Fenton Hardy is aboard the cutter and congratulates his sons on a job well done.

A worldwide alert is given, and any officers of the Parrot vessels with the claw insignia are being arrested. A contingent of American warships seize the island and capture the King of Barracuda. Back home, the Hardys travel to Washington for the official investigation, and confront the deposed king. They show him the pirate book and he confesses that the author was his grandfather, and that he always regretted losing it and feared that it would be his undoing.
