= The Secret of Pirates' Hill =

1956 book by Franklin W. Dixon

- Original edition
- Author: Franklin W. Dixon
- Language: English
- Series: Hardy Boys
- Genre: Detective, mystery
- Publisher: Grosset & Dunlap
- Publication date: January 1, 1956
- Publication place: United States
- Media type: Print (hardback & paperback)
- Pages: 192 pp
- Preceded by: The Clue in the Embers
- Followed by: The Ghost at Skeleton Rock

The Secret of Pirates' Hill is the thirty-sixth volume in the original The Hardy Boys series of mystery books for children and teens published by Grosset & Dunlap.

This book was written for the Stratemeyer Syndicate by John Almquist in 1956. Between 1959 and 1973 the first 38 volumes of this series were systematically revised as part of a project directed by Harriet Adams, Edward Stratemeyer's daughter. The original version of this book was shortened in 1972 by Priscilla Baker-Carr resulting in two slightly different stories sharing the same title.

== Plot summary ==
Hired by a mysterious businessman to locate an old Spanish cannon, the Hardy brothers and friends grow more and more suspicious as they encounter stolen cars and a mysterious man on a motorcycle. They eventually uncover the cannon and thousands in gold bullion after perilous underwater adventures.
