= The Crisscross Shadow =

Book by Franklin W. Dixon

- Original edition
- Author: Franklin W. Dixon
- Language: English
- Series: The Hardy Boys
- Genre: Detective, mystery
- Publisher: Grosset & Dunlap
- Publication date: January 1, 1953
- Publication place: United States
- Media type: Print (hardback & paperback)
- Pages: 192 pp
- Preceded by: The Secret of Wildcat Swamp
- Followed by: The Yellow Feather Mystery

The Crisscross Shadow is the thirty-second volume in the original The Hardy Boys series of mystery books for children and teens published by Grosset & Dunlap.

This book was written for the Stratemeyer Syndicate by Richard Cohen in 1953. Between 1959 and 1973 the first 38 volumes of this series were systematically revised as part of a project directed by Harriet Adams, Edward Stratemeyer's daughter. The original version of this book was shortened in 1969 by Priscilla Baker-Carr resulting in two slightly different stories sharing the same title.

== Plot summary ==
The Hardy boys find the missing deed to an Indian's land, prevent a phony salesman from carrying through a reckless scheme, and help their father solve a top-secret sabotage case.
