= The Clue of the Broken Blade =

1942 book by Franklin W. Dixon

- Original edition
- Author: Franklin W. Dixon
- Illustrator: Paul Luane
- Language: English
- Series: The Hardy Boys
- Genre: Detective, mystery
- Publisher: Grosset & Dunlap
- Publication date: January 1, 1942, Revised: 1970
- Publication place: United States
- Media type: Print (hardback & paperback)
- Pages: 192 pp
- Preceded by: The Mystery of the Flying Express
- Followed by: The Flickering Torch Mystery

The Clue of the Broken Blade is the twenty-first volume in the original The Hardy Boys series of mystery books for children and teens published by Grosset & Dunlap.

This book was written for the Stratemeyer Syndicate by John Button in 1942. Between 1959 and 1973 the first 38 volumes of this series were systematically revised as part of a project directed by Harriet Adams, Edward Stratemeyer's daughter. The original version of this book was rewritten in 1970 by Richard Deming resulting in two different stories with the same title.

Because of Dr. John Button's death in 1967, The Clue of the Broken Blade entered the Canadian public domain on January 1, 2017.

== Plot ==
=== Revised edition ===
After their fencing instructor Ettore Russo tells them about a family sword, the championship saber Adalante, the Hardy Boys go to California to search for the sword's missing half. Supposedly written on the sword is the owner's will that names the fencing instructor as a major heir of his deceased grandfather's fortune. Others also intent on finding the sword try hard to foil the Hardys from getting there first.

=== Original edition ===
Frank and Joe travel with their detective father, Fenton Hardy, to a town two hours from Bayport to break up a truck hijacking ring and recover two stolen swords for wealthy shipping magnate Arthur Barker.
