= Moonmist =

1986 video game

- Developer: Infocom
- Publisher: Infocom
- Designers: Stu Galley; Jim Lawrence
- Writers: Jim Lawrence; Stu Galley
- Engine: Z-machine
- Platforms: Amiga, Amstrad CPC, Apple II, Atari 8-bit, Atari ST, CoCo, Commodore 64, MS-DOS, TI-99/4A, Mac
- Release: Release 4: September 18, 1986; Release 9: October 22, 1986
- Genre: Interactive fiction
- Mode: Single-player

Moonmist is an interactive fiction game written by Stu Galley and Jim Lawrence and published by Infocom in 1986. The game was released simultaneously for the Amiga, Amstrad CPC, Apple II, Atari 8-bit computers, Atari ST, Commodore 64, MS-DOS, TRS-80, TI-99/4A, and Mac. It is Infocom's twenty-second game. Moonmist was re-released in Infocom's 1995 compilation The Mystery Collection, as well as the 1996 compilation Classic Text Adventure Masterpieces.

Jim Lawrence, one of the co-authors of Moonmist, ghostwrote books in the Nancy Drew and Hardy Boys series. Galley and Lawrence previously co-wrote Seastalker for Infocom.

Moonmist is the first known English language video game to feature a gay character.

== Plot ==
The player's character is a young detective, asked by friend Tamara Lynd to investigate her new home of Tresyllian Castle in Cornwall, England. Tamara has recently become engaged to the castle's lord, Jack Tresyllian. She was very happy until she began seeing what appeared to be The White Lady, a ghost who has allegedly haunted the castle for centuries. As if seeing a ghost wasn't nerve-racking enough, she's also begun to fear for her life. Is Tamara's imagination just overly excited from living in a large old castle, or is someone really trying to kill her? And if her life is in danger, is it from a ghost or someone using it as a disguise?

== Gameplay ==
The actual game is divided into several quests depending on the player's answer to the question "what is your favorite color?" As such, the game contains green (the easiest), blue, red, and yellow (the most difficult) quests, each with a separate criminal and treasure to locate. Interaction is made through the standard text commands typical of the genre.

The game must be completed by 6:59 am the following day or the game ends without a resolution. It is also possible to die in a few rare instances, though the focus of the game remains on exploration and deduction.

== Release ==
The Moonmist package includes the following physical items:

1. A book, The Legendary Ghosts of Cornwall written by Lady Lisbeth Norris, which includes a page dedicated to "The White Lady of Tresyllian Castle." The book has a stamp indicating it was checked out from the Festeron Town Library, the town where Wishbringer was set.
2. Two letters from Tamara Lynd to the player: one explaining Tamara's engagement to Lord Jack Tresyllian and her moving to the castle, and one begging the player to investigate the "White Lady".
3. An iron-on logo of the game's title.
4. A Visitor's Guide to Tresyllian Castle, a tourist-type brochure providing a history and rough maps.

The official hint book for Moonmist, which was purchasable by mail order and not included with the game, is printed in invisible ink.

== Reception ==
COMPUTE! wrote that Moonmist was a good introduction to Infocom adventures for newcomers, and an example for veterans of how their storytelling had improved from older games. However, Atari User expressed disappointment in the game's lack of depth and originality. While acknowledging that Moonmist had "deliberately been made simpler than the usual run of Infocom products", it noted that their earlier Wishbringer "was also a beginner's adventure but [..] offered yards more variety, entertainment, humour and challenge".

Macworld reviewed the Macintosh version of Moonmist, calling it "an excellent [example] of text-only interactive fiction." Macworld praises the gameplay, stating that "Moonmist succeeds in emulating the classic youth mystery novels. Its puzzles and challenges are inventive and playful, and they complement the story without requiring advanced leaps and bounds of logic ... There are four variations of Moonmist, each different enough so that repeated plays will still be enjoyable." Macworld also praises the graphics, stating that "Moonmist features excellent pen-and-ink drawings reminiscent of an old-fashioned illustrated novel." Macworld expresses that the feelies included with Moonmist contribute to the game's gothic atmosphere. Macworld however criticizes the inability to scroll back to previously seen text, stating that the game as a result requires the player to take notes.

== Legacy ==
In 1992, about six years after the original Moonmist, a remake of the game was developed and published by Japanese software development company SystemSoft for the NEC PC-9801, entitled Moonmist: Shiroki Kifujin no Nazo (MoonMist(ムーンミスト) ～白き貴夫人の謎～, MūnMisuto ～Shiroki Kifujin no Nazo～; lit. "Moonmist: The Mystery of the Noble White Lady"). There are differences in this enhanced remake: the game recognizes verb commands typed in kana (Japanese syllable system) or Latin alphabet. For convenience, some of the most common verb commands (Look, Take, etc.) can be accessed by pressing a corresponding button, but the player still has to type the name of an object. This remake also helps the player to interact with the environment by displaying a list of objects after the player has typed a command. Also, unlike the original, the remake contains enhanced graphics; every location has a unique background picture, on which the text is super-imposed, like in the PC-9801 version of Enchanter.
