= Jorge Longarón =

Spanish illustrator (1933–2019)

Jordi Longarón i Llopart (1 February 1933 – 10 May 2019), also known as Jorge Longarón, was a Spanish illustrator for magazines and comic strips.

Born in Barcelona, Longarón began professionally drawing during the 1940s and 1950s. He drew the comics Arsénico Lupin in Chispa and Chan-Chu-Llo in Garabatos and also contributed to El Pequeño Mosquetero, Serenata Extra, Hazañas Belicas and Hazañas del Oeste.

In 1969, for the Chicago Tribune and the New York News Syndicate, he teamed with writer Jim Lawrence to create the Friday Foster comic strip about a young female photographer. Friday Foster was launched January 18, 1970 and was syndicated until 1974, with Gray Morrow taking over the art chores in the final year. It was adapted into a feature film starring Pam Grier in 1975.

Longarón did many cover illustrations for American publications. As a fine artist, he painted Catalan landscapes and the American Southwest. His influence can be seen in the artwork of Cliff Chiang and others.
