= Joseph Lewis French =

American poet

Joseph Lewis French (1858–1936) was a novelist, editor, poet and newspaper man. The New York Times noted in 1925 that he may be "the most industrious anthologist of his time." He is known for his popular themed collections, and published more than twenty-five books between 1918 and his death in 1936. He initiated two magazines, The New West (c. 1887) and The Wave (c. 1890). Afterward he worked for newspapers "across the country" contributing poetry and articles. He struggled financially, and during 1927 the New York Graphic, a daily tabloid, published an autobiographical article they convinced him to write, entitled "I'm Starving – Yet I'm in Who's Who as the Author of 27 Famous Books."

== Publications ==
- The Best Ghost Stories, introduced by Arthur B. Reeve. New York: Boni & Liveright, 1919
- The Best Psychic Stories. New York: Boni & Liveright, c.1920
- A Breath of Desire : XXVIII sonnets. Boston: French, 1901
- Christ in Art. Boston: L. C. Page & Company, 1906c1899
- Great Ghost Stories, selected by Joseph Lewis French, with a foreword by James H. Hyslop. New York: Dodd, Mead and Company, 1918
- Great Pirate Stories, edited by Joseph Lewis French. New York: Tudor, c.1922
- Great Sea Stories. New York: Brentano's, c.1921
- Masterpieces of Mystery. Garden City, New York: Doubleday, Page & Company, 1920
- Masterpieces of Mystery, Vol. 1: Ghost Stories. Garden City, N. Y.: Doubleday, Page & Company, 1922. (Volume 1 of 4.)
- Masterpieces of Mystery In Four Volumes: Detective Stories
- Masterpieces of Mystery In Four Volumes: Mystic-Humorous Stories
- Masterpieces of Mystery: Riddle Stories
- The Pioneer West; narratives of the westward march of empire, selected and edited by Joseph Lewis French. Boston: Little, Brown and Company, 1923
- Tales of Terror. Boston: Small, Maynard & Company, 1925
- Ghosts, Grim and Gentle. New York: Dodd, Mead & Company, 1926
- The Ghost Story Omnibus. New York: Dodd, Mead & Company, 1926
