= Seastalker =

1984 video game

- Developer: Infocom
- Publisher: Infocom
- Designers: Stu Galley; Jim Lawrence
- Engine: Z-machine
- Platforms: Amiga, Amstrad CPC, Apple II, Atari 8-bit, Atari ST, Commodore 64, IBM PC, TRS-80 Color Computer, TI-99/4A, Mac
- Release: Release 15: May 1, 1984 Release 15: May 22, 1984; Release 16: May 15, 1985 Release 16: June 3, 1985
- Genres: Adventure, Interactive fiction
- Mode: Single-player

Seastalker is an interactive fiction game written by Stu Galley and Jim Lawrence and published by Infocom in 1984. It was released simultaneously for several popular computer platforms of the time, such as the Commodore 64, Apple II, and IBM PC compatibles (as a self-booting disk). The game was marketed as an introduction to interactive fiction for preteen players, having difficulty rating of "Junior." It was the only game to ever use this rating, which was replaced by the "Introductory" label given to games such as Wishbringer. It is Infocom's twelfth game.

Galley and Lawrence later wrote Moonmist for Infocom.

== Plot ==
The player character begins the game in a fictional research lab on the coast in the United States. Bly, the commander of an underwater research station, calls the player and describes that the station has come under attack by a sea monster. The player boards and fixes a submarine with an assistant Tip, while another assistant Sharon leaves the lab. The player and Tip navigate the submarine through a bay, before passing through gap in the sea wall and descending to the underwater station.

After arriving at the station, the player talks with Bly and discovers that there is a saboteur among the crew. After equipping the submarine with weaponry, the player notices that the pilot seat has been booby-trapped. They deduce the identity of the culprit, who tries to flee but is arrested by Bly. The player and Tip then set off in the submarine to search for the monster, only to discover that it is being controlled by another scientist and Sharon. The player attacks and temporarily disables the other submarine, knocking out the scientist in the process. Sharon survives, and plans to lead the monster back to a cave where it can be safely studied.

== Release ==
The package includes the following physical items:

1. A logbook for the Scimitar, including a letter from "The President" congratulating the player on acceptance into the Discovery Squad
2. Four double-sided "top secret Infocards", containing hints printed in blue ink beneath a pattern of red ink
3. A decoder featuring a small square of red plastic to reveal the hints on the Infocards
4. A nautical chart of Frobton Bay for navigation
5. A "Discovery Squad "badge" sticker

== Reception ==
Computer Gaming World noted Seastalker's easiness, recommending it only as a beginner's text adventure, particularly for young kids. Exemplifying this are the numerous tips dropped by both in-game characters and the game itself, directing the player to the included Infocards. The review complained of minor inconsistencies like items that could not be interacted with until an in-game character told the player of its existence.

PC Magazine gave Seastalker 10.0 points out of 12. It also noted the game's relatively low difficulty level, praised the prose, and stated, "I enjoyed myself immensely".
