= Data General Extended BASIC =

Version of the BASIC programming language developed by Data General

Extended BASIC
- Developer: Data General
- Initial release: 1970; 55 years ago
- Platform: Data General Nova
- Type: BASIC
- License: Commercial proprietary software

Data General Extended BASIC, also widely known as Nova Extended BASIC, was a BASIC programming language interpreter for the Data General Nova series minicomputers. It was based on the seminal Dartmouth BASIC, including the Fifth Edition's string variables and powerful MAT commands for matrix manipulation. In contrast to the compile-and-go Dartmouth BASIC, Extended BASIC was an interpreter.

To Dartmouth's simple string manipulation system, Extended BASIC added array slicing, which was common on BASICs of the era after its introduction in HP Time-Shared BASIC. It became common in 1980s era microcomputers that did not use Microsoft BASIC, like Sinclair BASIC, Atari BASIC and others. This contrasts with the Microsoft style which uses string functions like LEFT$, and thus makes porting string code to other dialects somewhat difficult.

Data General later purchased rights to a much-expanded BASIC which was released as Data General Business Basic. This added powerful database functionality and largely replaced Extended BASIC on DG platforms.

== Description ==
=== Mathematics ===
The internal floating point number format normally used two 16-bit words for a total of 32-bits, stored least significant bit first. Bit 0 was the sign, 1 through 7 was the exponent stored in excess-64 format, and 8 through 31 the mantissa stored as hexadecimal digits. Numbers could alternately use a double-precision format that extended the mantissa only, adding another 32-bits. That meant the double-precision format did not extend the range of numbers that could be stored, only the accuracy of those numbers. Possible numbers ranged from 5.4×10^{−79} to −7.2×10^{75}. Numbers with less than six digits were displayed as decimals, while those with more were displayed in exponent format.

Variable names could consist of a single letter, or a letter and a single digit. Two-letter names were not allowed. Arrays could be DIMmed in 1 (array) or 2 (matrix) dimensions, and the lower bound was always 1. As was common at the time, variables with no DIM defaulted to a 1-D array of 10 elements. Confusingly, if a variable was DIMed, it was not the same as a variable with the same name that had not been DIMed; A(1) and A might be the same or different variables depending on how they were created.

Mathematics operators were the standard set, with the addition of a unary plus. Relational operators for comparisons were also the standard set, there was no # for not-equals as found in some contemporary BASICs.

=== Matrix math ===
Extended BASIC added the suite of matrix math operations from Dartmouth BASIC's Fifth Edition. These were, in essence, macros that performed operations that would otherwise be accomplished with FOR...NEXT loops.

The system included a number of pre-rolled matrixes, like ZER for a zero-matrix, CON for a matrix of all 1's, and IDN for the identity matrix. Most mathematical operations were supported, for instance, MAT A=A*2 multiplies every element in A by 2. MAT A=DET A takes the determinant, and MAT A=INV(A) inverts it.

=== Strings ===
String literals (constants) were entered between double-quotes. Characters within strings could be escaped by placing their ASCII value between angle-brackets, for instance, "This prints a quote, <34>." String variables, like their numeric counterparts, consisted of only a single letter, or one letter and one digit.

As is the case for all variables in Extended BASIC, string variables were normally allocated ten spaces, but could be extended up to a maximum of 32 k with an explicit DIM. Because the array syntax was used to declare the length of the string, string arrays were not possible. Assigning a string to a variable that was too small too hold it resulted in any excess being truncated.

String manipulation was carried out using array slicing syntax. A$(10) referred to the substring from position 10 to the end of the string, while A$(10,20) referred to characters 10 through 20. Concatenation used the comma, so A$=A$,B$ added B$ to the end of A$. This was an uncommon syntax, even when it was being introduced, most BASICs using slicing used that for concatenation as well, for instance, A$(LEN(A$))=B$ would append B$ at the end of A$, while those using string functions, like Microsoft BASIC, already widely used the plus sign for this operation.

This syntax change was because Extended BASIC allowed math operators to be applied to strings, up to the first non-numeric character. For instance, A="1234"+"2345" would put 3579 into A, without the need to explicitly convert them to numerics. In most dialects, this task would require both numbers to be converted to numbers using the VAL function, like A=VAL("1234")+VAL("2345"). Non-numerics were simply ignored, A="1234"+"FRED" put 1234 into A.

Extended BASIC lacked the CHANGE command from Dartmouth that converted an entire string to or from ASCII values in an array, for instance, CHANGE "HELLOWORLD" TO B which results in B being assigned 10 numbers, each one an ASCII value. This system was replaced with the slicing system.

=== Statements ===
Extended BASIC is otherwise similar to Dartmouth and Microsoft BASIC in the variety of commands it supports and their syntax. Exceptions include CON instead of CONT, DELAY instead of PAUSE (which was not common anyway). Two additions were ON ERR THEN... which allowed errors to be trapped, a feature that became common on other BASICs, and ON ESC THEN... which allowed the break key (escape in this case) to be trapped as well. RETRY was similar to CON, but allowed a single line to be re-run after a break, instead of continuing the entire program. TIME set the time limit for TINPUT statements to respond, which was a "timed input" otherwise identical to INPUT.

Extended BASIC added a variety of immediate mode editing statements that are not really part of the language per se. These included ERASE to remove a range of lines from a program, ENTER to read the contents of a text file into the program, and RENUMBER. CARDS was similar to ENTER, but read the lines from the card reader.

It also added a number of statements for dealing with the underlying file system, including FILE which lists files in the user's directory and LIBRARY which does the same with wildcards, GDIR which printed the name of that directory, LOAD and SAVE for the program code, RENAME and DELETE, and DISK, which printed the free space. PUNCH was like SAVE, but sent the file to the card punch. WHATS printed the attributes of a given file.

Other operating system-related statements included WHO to print a list of logged-in users, MSG to bother them, PAGE to set the right margin (page width), and SIZE to print the memory used by the program, the opposite of what would be returned in MS BASIC with FRE().

=== Functions ===
Functions closely matched Dartmouth and Microsoft BASIC, with a few additions. CPU() returned a numeric value encoding the positions of the front-panel switches. EOF(x) returned whether or not file x had reached the end-of-file. POS(X$,Y$,Z) returned the position of B$ within A$, anywhere after the optional position Z, similar to the MS-standard INSTR. Note that this overrides the POS found in MS, which returns the current column position of the cursor.
