= While the Clock Ticked =

1932 book by Franklin W. Dixon

- Original edition cover
- Author: Franklin W. Dixon
- Illustrator: J. Clemens Gretta
- Language: English
- Series: The Hardy Boys
- Genre: Detective, mystery
- Publisher: Grosset & Dunlap
- Publication date: January 1, 1932, revised edition 1962
- Publication place: United States
- Media type: Print (hardback and paperback)
- Pages: original edition 192, revised edition 174
- ISBN: 0-448-08911-4
- OCLC: 26189365
- Preceded by: What Happened at Midnight
- Followed by: Footprints Under the Window

While the Clock Ticked is the eleventh volume in the original The Hardy Boys series of mystery books for children and teens published by Grosset & Dunlap.

It was called "a mystery story filled with excitement and adventure" 13 years after its original publication. The book can also be considered a locked-room mystery.

This book was written for the Stratemeyer Syndicate by Leslie McFarlane in 1932. Between 1959 and 1973 the first 38 volumes of this series were systematically revised as part of a project directed by Harriet Adams, Edward Stratemeyer's daughter. The original version of this book was rewritten in 1962 by James Buechler resulting in two different stories with the same title.

The original-text edition was the last book to be released in the red binding before Grosset & Dunlap switched to a brown binding in mid-1932.

== Plot ==
=== Original edition ===
When Raymond Dalrymple starts to receive death threats he seeks help from Fenton Hardy; however Mr. Hardy is out of town so Frank and Joe offer to help. Mr. Dalrymple did not want to give the Hardy boys the case, instead telling them to investigate the old Purdy house out on the Shore Road. While walking on the shore road they are almost hit by a big touring car with the curtains down; they then meet a motorcycle cop who was chasing the car which supposedly carried river thieves.

The next day Mr. Dalrymple returned, having decided to let the Hardy boys take the case. He explains that he recently purchased the Purdy house and had been using a secret safe room there to find solitude; however he had received death threats delivered to the secret room while it was securely locked. The Hardy boys explore the Purdy house that night and see a man who looks like Mr. Dalrymple enter the house before they hear screams coming from the house and meet Hurd Applegate, whom the boys met while solving The Tower Treasure mystery, running from the house.

Mr. Applegate is too excited to explain what he was doing there, so the Hardy boys have to go back and explore the home another day. Upon further exploration they find an unused wing of the home which has recently had locks added to the doors. The police are called and find the locked rooms filled with stolen goods, stolen by the river thieves. While the police thought this resolved the case, the Hardy boys kept an eye on the Purdy house and found a stranger coming to the house, who then runs away after another scream is heard.

While trying to catch two of the river thieves, the Hardys are caught by the men, bound and gagged, and thrown into a boat. The thieves mean to leave them on the river bank to make their escape, but Joe manages to tear off his gag and yell for help. This brings the police, and the Hardys are freed, and the men captured.

When they investigate the house again, the Hardy boys are taken hostage by a crazy old man named Amos and another man who looks almost exactly like Mr. Dalrymple. Surprisingly they are rescued by Mr. Applegate, and a bomb attached to the ticking grandfather clock is disarmed. Mr. Dalrymple arrives with the police and Amos falls to his death while trying to escape. The Hardy boys examine the device he was using and solve the mystery of how he managed to deliver the death threats to the secret room, as well as locating the stamps which Mr. Dalrymple's doppelgänger had stolen from Mr. Applegate.

=== Revised edition ===
A banker named Raymond Dalrymple of Lakeside gets death threats and shows up at the Hardy house, seeking Fenton Hardy's assistance. Frank and Joe offer to help and he reluctantly agrees. Soon after that, during a hike with their friends, the Hardy boys are nearly run over by a car. They then investigate the Purdy place. After that, they rest and talk over their recent misadventures.

Another stormy exploration of the mansion reveals a man resembling Dalrymple enter the house. Suddenly, a light goes on in the house, followed by a man's scream. This later proved to be an elderly man named Hurd Applegate, a friend of the Hardy boys. He tells them of the theft of his valuable jade collection. Further sleuthing reveals that the thefts are performed in well-known speedboats such as the Hardys' Sleuth. Frank and Joe chase after two of the thieves, but the men turn the tables on the boys and capture them. The Hardys are bound and gagged and thrown into a boat. Their captors mean to take them out onto the river and toss them overboard. But Joe manages to tear his gag off just in time and yell for help. This brings the police, and the Hardys are freed, while the thieves are arrested.

Shortly after, Dalrymple disappears and the Hardys, fearing for their lives, go to the Purdy place to look for him. Then the Hardys are held up by a man named Arthur Jensen, looking similar to Dalrymple, living in his house secretly in hiding. Jensen was a thief who stole small but valuable things from ships and such. Frank and Joe are bound and gagged, along with an inventor named Amos Wandy, with a time bomb set to go off at 3 a.m. With less than two minutes remaining, a window panel breaks and Chet Morton emerges and unbinds Frank, who then defuse the bomb just seconds before it was supposed to go off. Joe and Wandy are unbound next. Then Jensen is later caught on the Purdy mansion grounds and the valuables are retrieved. Another discovery proves that the death threats to Raymond Dalyrmple are lowered down through the chimney in the jaws of one of Amos Wandy's inventions, which rolls to the middle of the hidden room, then drops the note and is raised up by a wire.

At the end, Dalrymple throws a surprise party for the boys and gives Mr. Wandy permission to stay in the hidden room and invent whenever he wants.
