= The Sinister Signpost =

Book by Franklin W. Dixon

- Original edition
- Author: Franklin W. Dixon
- Original title: The Sinister Sign Post
- Cover artist: J. Clemens Gretta
- Language: English
- Series: The Hardy Boys
- Genre: Detective, mystery
- Publisher: Grosset & Dunlap
- Publication date: September 1, 1936, revised edition 1968
- Publication place: United States
- Media type: Print (hardback & paperback)
- Pages: 192 pp
- ISBN: 0-448-08915-7
- Preceded by: The Hidden Harbor Mystery
- Followed by: A Figure in Hiding

The Sinister Sign Post (later retitled The Sinister Signpost) is the fifteenth volume in the original The Hardy Boys series of mystery books for children and teens published by Grosset & Dunlap.

This book was written for the Stratemeyer Syndicate by Leslie McFarlane in 1936. Between 1959 and 1973 the first 38 volumes of this series were systematically revised as part of a project directed by Harriet Adams, Edward Stratemeyer's daughter. The original version of this book was rewritten in 1968 by Tom Mulvey resulting in two different stories with the same title.

== Plot Summary (revised edition) ==
This story begins with Frank and Joe Hardy driving home along Shore Road when they have an accident with a dragster. After they arrive home their father, Fenton Hardy, tells them about a new case he has taken on for Alden Automotive Research and Development Company, with which he would like the boys' help. Mr. Hardy explains that Mr. Alden believes someone is trying to steal the plans for a secret new engine he is designing, and that two of his racing cars which were equipped with new engine had strange accidents in which their windshields suddenly "crazed" (turned an opaque white), just after passing a road sign warning “DANGER”. While they are discussing the case, someone fires a smoke grenade into their house with a warning attached, telling them to "drop the Alden case".

Frank and Joe start by working undercover at Alden’s shop, while their friend Chet Morton takes an interest in jet propelling his bicycle, which leads to humorous results. At the shop, the boys meet Barto Sigor and learn that he has a twin brother Vilno who recently quit Alden’s employment. The boys immediately suspect that the twins may have swapped spots so that Vilno can gain access to the plans for the new motor. The Hardy boys also meet Roger Alden, Mr. Alden’s son, who seems to have a bad attitude. He is the boys' second suspect.

Aunt Gertrude receives news that she has just inherited a farm for retired racing horses. She is horrified at the prospect of owning such a thing, but before she can sell it the Hardy boys go to see the place. When they return they find that Mr. Alden’s racehorse Topnotch has been stolen and is being held for ransom. The Hardy boys return to the farm where they meet with Fowler, the manager of the farm, who tells them to get lost. While there, Frank picks up a cartridge from Fowler’s rifle, which he later matches to the rifle casing used to shoot the smoke grenade into the Hardy home. It is later revealed that Fowler is actually Norman Dodson, and is responsible for the theft of Topnotch. Using their detective skills, the Hardy boys figure out where the horse is being kept. They go there, get captured, but manage to escape while riding Topnotch to freedom.

Returning to the Alden automotive case, they learn that Barto has fled the plant with Mr. Alden's experimental race car. The Hardy boys eventually figure out where Barto is hiding, but when they reach the mansion hideout, they are suddenly "frozen in their tracks" by a "powerful invisible force". Once captured they find their father has also been trapped, along with Mr. Alden and his son Roger. While they are being held hostage Vilno brags to the boys about his "sonic trap" which can trap objects inside using "hypersonic vibrations" and he explains how he used his "hypersonic generator" to craze the windshields of the race cars. Once Vilno leaves Joe manages to escape from the locked room through an air vent, where Chet Morton arrives on his rocket-propelled bike, causing the villains to crash their car between two trees and trapping them inside until the police can arrive to arrest them.

== Plot summary (original edition) ==
The Hardy boys plan to go for a football game in the Seneca grounds. While they are going, they experience a shortage of petrol, and are asked by a man in a truck from Old Kentucky the directions to the racetracks. Shortly after giving the truck directions, the brothers hear a gunshot which they mark as suspicious. Despite the many setbacks the brothers encounter while going to the game, they reached just in time to see the opening kick-off.

Frank is continuously bothered by a foreigner who introduces himself as Mr. Vilnoff, who doesn't understand the rules of football, and continues to pester the older Hardy lad into explaining the game to him. Frank tries losing the interrogator in the crowd, but he pops up again, right next to him, asking the self-same annoying questions. Frank is so distressed that he believes the only plus-point of the day is Bayport High's victory.

The next day, via Chet, the Hardys come to know that the famous racehorse, Topnotch, is missing. And, in the middle of the night, there was an explosion in the munitions factory near Renside. Frank has a hunch that the truck from Old Kentucky was the truck dropping clean out of sight. That afternoon, the Hardys decide to go to the races; however, they discover that their roadster was in need of repair which would not be fixed till later in the afternoon. They go to the races via bus and stop by the nearest refreshment stand, only to see that the man behind the counter was shortchanging a confused mother buying refreshments.

After giving the lady the dollar the shopkeeper owed to her, they make inquiries under the grandstand about Topnotch, and the red-faced trainer they are questioning is convinced that Topnotch has been stolen. While roaming about, the brothers notice a child who looked friendless and forlorn. The Hardys bring him a kite to cheer him up, and they depart, happy that the kid is enjoying it. However, they notice another man looking at the child, who introduces himself as Jockey Ivan, the owner of Topnotch. The boys use their detective skills to come to terms with the fact that the horse is being held for ransom.

That very same day, Joe sees another machine swing in from the road and edge into the parking space, its bumper nudging one of the automobiles at the top of the incline. The brakes of the automobile had not been set, however, because that collision set the wheels of the automobile into the brink of the embankment. Slowly but surely, the auto starts heading down the slope, and to Joe's utter horror, it seems to be heading towards Vilnoff, Frank's only-too-annoying acquaintance from the previous day's game, and Ivan, the two of whom seem to be in a heated argument. Joe saves them by braking the automobile; however, the owner of the auto starts hurling accusations at the younger Hardy, who stands his ground, and with the help of Frank, thwarts him.

During the course of the day, the brothers hear the affair discussed freely, but hear nothing of importance to them. They decide to investigate the route by which they'd reached the Seneca field, and they barely avoiding being hit by a speeding truck driver. The brothers, however, are sure the man in the backseat is Mr. Vilnoff. They investigate what's ahead, but give up as it gets dark. When they get home, their chum Chet Morton pulls up a joke on them by telling them they're wanted by the police. Mr. Hardy, a famous detective, decides to take his sons to Vilnoff's home for an alibi-check, where they learn that he is sailing for Europe in a few days. However, unlike Fenton Hardy, Frank and Joe don't trust Vilnoff, so they scan the outskirts of his home. There, they are caught by the gardener and chauffeur, but are let off by Vilnoff. Frank has a theory that Vilnoff deliberately sat by him because he knew he'd be questioned, and Joe agrees. He then pulls out what seems to be a clay model of a human hand, saying he picked it up before they scrammed.

Aunt Gertrude tells the boys that Ivan had come to check on them. They decide to look him up, and in that excuse, they'd check the crossroads. When they reach the crossroads, Frank suggests they take a shortcut through the field, which involves climbing up a wooden fence. However, they don't escape scot-free, as the barbed wire pokes holes on their clothes, and a mad goat trails them out. They continue investigating the crossroads, and come across a placard which tells them to keep out because of shooting practice, but the Hardys decide to risk it. Here, they encounter a mad dog, who trees them like a coon, but from the tree, Frank sees the missing truck. They go over, and seeing the truck unoccupied, decide to investigate. But the hound keeps barking, thus bringing men over. The brothers are luckily not found, and they decide to investigate a bit more before giving up thanks to the darkness.

While going to Bayport, they stop by a gas-station to eat something, but the hostile proprietor seems to want to get rid of them when a man in a green truck comes by. The brothers eavesdrop into their conversation. Frank jots down the plate-number of the green truck, which belongs to the proprietor's friend "Pete". When the bus to Bayport comes, the Hardys spot Ivan inside, who explains that the kidnappers left a ransom letter to owner of the Prescott stables, Mr. Prescott. The brothers and Ivan then receive a cryptic warning about staying away from the shady business.

Later that day, at home, the brothers receive a threatening phone call that threatens them to stay away from the business. The next morning, Chet Morton's cousin arrives, and the Hardys go via boat with Chet to pick him up. Here, they see a speedboat passing them, and they are sure the man at the helm is Vilnoff. Bill Morton arrives, along with Fenton Hardy, who claims to have seen Vilnoff in the New York airport. Mr. Hardy tells his sons to notify the people from Quickshot Photos to click a picture of every passenger boarding the ship and forward the films to Mr. Hardy, which they do. While going home, they see the self-same proprietor of the gas-station waving to them for help. They give him the help he needs, only to see that the Sleuth has started to backfire. They ask for petrol, but halt when they see a bunch of men making multiple trips to the Bayport woods with briefcases.

While investigating this, they get pegged to be normal teenagers who're gagged and tied up. They escape and go home. The next few days, they made no progress, but one day, Mr. Prescott called on the Hardy home, and the boys tell them about the truck they found. Mr. Prescott wants them to take him there, and they do - only to see the truck gone. The very same day, they decide to investigate the Vilnoff home, only to see that the home was protected with burglar alarms and they were caught. However, they resume their search, only for Joe to get electrocuted. He survives, but got shocked for a bit.

After a little more investigation, they see a glowing torch get reflected towards a cave (the "sinister signpost") which they investigate. Here they learn that Vilnoff has destructive intentions regarding sabotaging the Spurtown races after the ransom is paid. It also turns up that Vilnoff has henchmen, and they are conspirating against the races too. After a long resistance, the bad guys are captured and sent to jail. The story ends with the Hardy brothers reading the will of Aunt Gertrude's distant relative, Jonathan Hood, who died in Kentucky two months ago. He had willed some of his property to Aunt Gertrude, and that he had left to Aunt Gertrude his only asset- a stable of race-horses.
