= The Mystery of Cabin Island =

Book by Franklin W. Dixon

- Original edition
- Author: Franklin W. Dixon
- Language: English
- Series: The Hardy Boys
- Genre: Detective, mystery
- Publisher: Grosset & Dunlap
- Publication date: September 1, 1929 revised edition 1966
- Publication place: United States
- Media type: Print (hardback & paperback)
- Pages: original edition 214, revised edition 178
- ISBN: 978-0-448-08908-9
- Preceded by: The Secret of the Caves
- Followed by: The Great Airport Mystery
- Text: The Mystery of Cabin Island at Wikisource

The Mystery Of Cabin Island is the eighth volume in the original The Hardy Boys series of mystery books for children and teens published by Grosset & Dunlap. This book was written for the Stratemeyer Syndicate by Leslie McFarlane in 1929. Between 1959 and 1973 the first 38 volumes of this series were systematically revised as part of a project directed by Harriet Adams, Edward Stratemeyer's daughter. The original version of this book was rewritten in 1966 by Anne Shultes resulting in two different stories with the same title.

== Plot summary (revised edition) ==
A series of adventures begins for the Hardy Boys and their friends Chet and Biff after they are invited to spend Christmas vacation on Cabin Island at the invitation of its owner, Mr. Jefferson, as a reward for recovering Jefferson's car in The Shore Road Mystery. While they are collecting the keys to the cabin from Mr. Jefferson they meet Mr. Hanleigh who is interested in purchasing the island. As well, Mr. Jefferson asks the Hardy boys to locate his grandson Johnny who has gone missing.

As the boys try to enjoy themselves, someone seems determined to spoil their fun. First, two high school dropouts vandalize their loaded ice boat, the Sea Gull, which delays their departure for Cabin Island by a few hours. Once on the island, a ghost-like hooting leads to an innocent and humorous discovery. All their groceries are stolen, and so Frank and Joe head for the coast to purchase new supplies, but not long after, they find the original stock buried in snow. Chet sees a ghost walking through the woods, as well Mr. Hanleigh and the two high school dropouts are seen sneaking around the island, apparently searching for something.

After a series of collisions and near misses with the Sea Gull, the Hardys learn that Mr. Hanleigh is the nephew of a former servant of Mr. Jefferson and he is looking for something hidden in the fireplace. A foreign dignitary, who was earlier mistaken for a ghost due to his white robes, reveals that he is seeking a medal that was presented to the grandfather of his nation's ruler, and had been misled by Mr. Hanleigh who was pretending to be Jefferson's representative.

The Hardy boys find the missing medals hidden in the chimney and also locate Johnny, returning both to Mr. Jefferson who rewards them with a medal for each of them.

== Plot summary (original edition) ==
While riding in their homemade iceboat on the frozen surface of Barmet Bay, Frank and Joe Hardy and Chet Morton discuss their plans for the upcoming Christmas holiday break, and decide to ask if they could rent out the namesake cabin on Cabin Island. However, a mysterious stranger chases them off the island, and on their return to shore, they nearly crash into an iceboat piloted by Ted Carson and Ike Nash, two reckless and obnoxious youths. The boys are later invited to the home of Elroy Jefferson, a man whose car they returned in The Shore Road Mystery, so he can reward them. They overhear an argument between Jefferson, the owner of Cabin Island, and a Mr. Hanleigh, who, evidently, is constantly trying to buy the titular cabin for large sums of money. Mr. Jefferson gives them a monetary reward for returning his stolen Pierce Arrow (Jefferson was in Europe when the car was returned), and then the boys ask if they can use his cabin for the holidays, which Mr. Jefferson grants them permission for. As time goes by on the island, the boys notice that strange things have been going on, most notably the disappearance of their supplies. Frank and Joe head to a village on the mainland to get more supplies, and end up talking to a storekeeper named Amos Grice. Grice tells the boys that Jefferson had once married a woman who would inherit the valuable Bender stamp collection from her father, and that rumor has it that Jefferson really married her for the stamps, which were turned over to Elroy when she did inherit them. Jefferson built the cabin years ago for his late wife and son to use in the summer, but while it was being constructed the stamp collection vanished along with their servant, John Sparewell, and Mrs. Jefferson died shortly thereafter. It is later revealed that after Sparewell was almost caught with the stamps, he went to Cabin Island to try to return the stamps in secret. However, he hid them in a gap in the chimney, intending to retrieve them the next day, but the gap was mortared up, sealing them up. Before Sparewell died, he willed the box of stamps to his nephew, Mr. Hanleigh, with the instructions to return it to Jefferson. Hanleigh had been trying to buy the island and prowl around it to recover the stamps, but never intended to give them back to Jefferson. Neither Hanleigh nor the boys were able to find the stamps, but when a violent storm tears the chimney apart, the box of stamps is miraculously recovered.
