= Secret of the Cave =

Secret of the Cave may refer to:

- Secret of the Cave (2006 film), a 2006 student film
- The Haunted House: The Secret of the Cave, a 2018 Korean animated film in The Haunted House by Tooniverse
- The Secret of the Caves, a 1929 book in the Hardy Boys series by Leslie McFarlane
