= Leslie McFarlane =

Canadian journalist, novelist, screenwriter, and filmmaker

- Born: Charles Leslie McFarlane; October 25, 1902; Carleton Place, Ontario, Canada
- Died: September 6, 1977 (aged 74); Oshawa, Ontario, Canada
- Occupations: novelist, screenwriter, journalist, filmmaker
- Children: Brian McFarlane Norah A. Perez
- Writing career
- Pen name: Franklin W. Dixon, Carolyn Keene
- Genre: Young adult adventure fiction
- Notable work: Hardy Boys series

Charles Leslie McFarlane (October 25, 1902 – September 6, 1977) was a Canadian journalist, novelist, screenwriter, and filmmaker, who is most famous for ghostwriting many of the early books in the very successful Hardy Boys series, using the pseudonym Franklin W. Dixon.

== Biography ==
=== Early life ===
The son of a school principal, McFarlane was raised in the town of Haileybury, Ontario. He became a freelance writer shortly after high school. He and his family moved to Whitby, Ontario, in 1936. This period is described in his 1975 book A Kid in Haileybury.

=== Journalist ===
As a young man he worked in Sudbury, Ontario, as a newspaper reporter, then for a weekly paper in Toronto, before taking a job at the Springfield Republican newspaper in Springfield, Massachusetts.

=== Stratemeyer Syndicate ===
While in the U.S., he replied to a want ad placed by the Stratemeyer Syndicate, publisher of such titles as Tom Swift and the Bobbsey Twins. As a result, he freelanced in 1926 and 1927 as one of the authors using the pseudonym Roy Rockwood to write seven of the Dave Fearless serialized mystery novels.

==== The Hardy Boys ====
This led to his involvement with the Hardy Boys, a project on which he was a large contributor, writing 19 of the first 25 books between 1927 and 1946, and 21 overall. He also wrote books in several other juvenile series, published in pulp magazines, novellas or novels over his fifty-year career, at one point writing six novels in one year. McFarlane earned as little as $85 per book during the Great Depression, yet he continued because he had a growing family.

According to his son, McFarlane regarded the Hardy Boys books as a nuisance. "In his diaries, my father talks about having to write another of those cursed books, in order to earn another $100 to buy coal for the furnace. And he never read them over afterward. It was only much later that he accepted plaudits for the work."

His daughter, Norah McFarlane Perez, said in an interview that "They'd give him an outline, but to make it palatable, he'd come up with different characters and add colour and use large words, and inject his wonderful sense of humour. And then he'd finish and say, 'I will never write another juvenile book.' But then the bills would pile up and he'd start another."

However, McFarlane was not bitter about not earning a cut of the enormous revenues generated by his work. "He was very philosophical about it. His attitude was, 'Look, I took these on and I was glad to get the deal.' There was no rancour," according to his daughter.

==== Nancy Drew, The Dana Girls ====
McFarlane also wrote the first four volumes of The Dana Girls series for the Stratemeyer Syndicate under the pseudonym Carolyn Keene, which the Syndicate also used for the Nancy Drew series of books.

==== Authorship of The Phantom Freighter ====
Although there are claims that his last Hardy Boys book, The Phantom Freighter, was actually written by his wife Amy, his biographer Marilyn Greenwald concluded that this was unlikely. In his 1976 autobiography Ghost of the Hardy Boys, McFarlane says that The Phantom Freighter "was written in 1946 in motel rooms at night on a location in Nova Scotia when I was directing a film".

=== Film and television work ===
While still writing for the series for the Stratemeyer Syndicate, McFarlane returned to Canada to work for the National Film Board of Canada (NFB). As part of the NFB in Montreal, he wrote and directed documentaries and short dramas including the 1951 documentary Royal Journey, as well as Here's Hockey, a 1953 documentary about ice hockey featuring Montreal Canadiens star Jean Béliveau. He also wrote the documentary titled Herring Hunt, nominated for an Academy Award for Live Action Short Film. Moving to Toronto he wrote for CBC television and at the suggestion of his friend Lorne Greene.

== Legacy ==
The Leslie McFarlane Public School in Whitby, Ontario, was named in his honour until it was demolished in early 2010 when it was deemed more expensive to repair than it would be to build a new structure.

His son, Brian McFarlane, is well known as a former commentator on Hockey Night in Canada.

He was the subject of the 2004 book The Secret of the Hardy Boys: Leslie McFarlane and the Stratemeyer Syndicate by Marilyn Greenwald.

In 2006, McMaster University in Hamilton, Ontario, acquired Leslie McFarlane's diaries, correspondence, and early material, along with first editions of The Secret of the Caves and The Tower Treasure. The university plans to acquire early first editions of all of McFarlane's books. The archive donated to McMaster is estimated to have a value of $150,000.

== Bibliography ==
Autobiographies

- A Kid in Haileybury (1975, 2nd ed. 1996)
- Ghost of the Hardy Boys (1976)

Mysteries

- Streets of Shadow (1930)
- The Murder Tree (1931)
- Agent of the Falcon (1975)
- Mystery of Spider Lake (1975)
- Squeeze Play (1975)
- The Dynamite Flynns (1975)
- The Snow Hawk (1976)
- Breakaway (1976)

The Hardy Boys books attributed to Leslie McFarlane

1. The Tower Treasure (1927)
2. The House on the Cliff (1927)
3. The Secret of the Old Mill (1927)
4. The Missing Chums (1928)
5. Hunting for Hidden Gold (1928)
6. The Shore Road Mystery (1928)
7. The Secret of the Caves (1929)
8. The Mystery of Cabin Island (1929)
9. The Great Airport Mystery (1930)
10. What Happened at Midnight (1931)
11. While the Clock Ticked (1932)
12. Footprints Under the Window (1933)†
13. The Mark on the Door (1934)†
14. The Hidden Harbor Mystery (1935)†
15. The Sinister Signpost (1936)
16. A Figure in Hiding (1937)
17. The Secret Warning (1938)
18. The Flickering Torch Mystery (1943)
19. The Melted Coins (1944)
20. The Short-Wave Mystery (1945)
21. The Secret Panel (1946)
22. The Phantom Freighter (1947)‡

† Disputed, as the writing style differs significantly from other work known to be McFarlane's.
‡ Syndicate records show the paid author was McFarlane's wife Amy, but McFarlane took credit for this volume in his autobiography.

Dana Girls Mystery Books

1. By the Light of the Study Lamp (1934)
2. The Secret at Lone Tree Cottage (1934)
3. In the Shadow of the Tower (1934)
4. A Three-Cornered Mystery (1935)
