= The House on the Cliff =

1927 book by Franklin W. Dixon

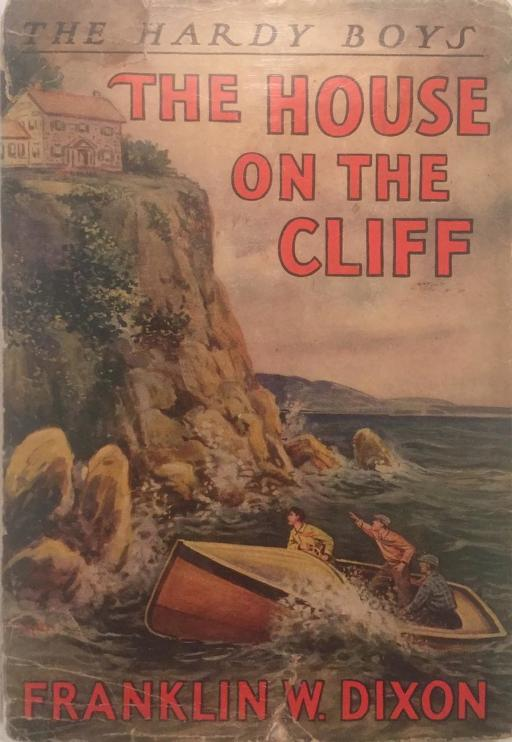
- Original 1927 edition
- Author: Franklin W. Dixon
- Language: English
- Series: The Hardy Boys
- Genre: Detective, mystery
- Publisher: Grosset & Dunlap
- Publication date: June 1, 1927 (original); 1959 (revised edition)
- Publication place: United States
- Pages: 192
- ISBN: 9780448089027
- OCLC: 1281229
- Preceded by: The Tower Treasure
- Followed by: The Secret of the Old Mill

The House On The Cliff is the second book in the original Hardy Boys series published by Grosset & Dunlap. The book ranks 72nd on the Publishers Weekly's All-Time Bestselling Children's Book List in the United States with 1,712,433 copies sold as of 2001. This book is one of the "Original 10" Hardy Boys books and is an excellent example of the writing style used by the Stratemeyer Syndicate's writers. This style influenced many other "youth adventure series" books that the Stratemeyer Syndicate also published, including the Nancy Drew series (designed as a corollary to The Hardy Boys written from the perspective of young girls), the Tom Swift adventure series, the Bobbsey Twins and other lesser known series. All of them used a unique writing style that made them very recognizable as Stratemeyer product.

This book was written for the Stratemeyer Syndicate by Leslie McFarlane in 1927. US Copyright on the 1927 book expired on January 1, 2023, putting the 1927 version in the US Public Domain. The Canadian Copyright is still in effect until January 1, 2048 for the 1927 version, due to Canada using “the author’s life plus 70 years” copyright model for works-for-hire (Leslie McFarlane died in 1977). The 1959 version will enter the US Public Domain on January 1, 2055, while it will enter the Canadian Public Domain on January 1, 2053 (Harriet Stratemeyer Adams died in 1982). Between 1959 and 1973, the first 38 volumes of this series were systematically revised as part of a project directed by Harriet Adams, Edward Stratemeyer's daughter. The original version of this book was rewritten in 1959 by Harriet S. Adams, resulting in two different stories with the same title.

== Plot summary (revised edition) ==
Fenton Hardy, the famous private detective and father of the Hardy Boys, asks his sons to help him with his latest case involving a criminal named Felix Snattman and the illegal drug trade smuggling of stolen drugs. Hardy directs Frank and Joe to a house on the cliff, whose location overlooking Barmet Bay offers an excellent vantage point to watch for smugglers.

The Hardys are tricked into the house by cries for help, and are trapped for a short time in the attic; meanwhile, their telescope and motorcycles are damaged, possibly by the smugglers. They observe a man boating on Barmet Bay being chased by another motorboat. After his boat explodes in flames, Biff and Joe swim out while Frank and Chet get a rowboat to rescue the man. Once brought to shore, the man regains consciousness and says his name is Mr. Jones, which the Hardys believe to be a thinly-disguised alias.

The next day, both Mr. Hardy and Mr. Jones disappear. Frank and Joe seek out Mr. Hardy's informant at the maritime docks, Pretzel Pete, to see if he knows anything about the smugglers. Frank and Joe revisit the Shore Road area, and inside the house not far from the house on the cliff, Frank sees Mr. Hardy's hat. With their friends Chet Morton, Biff Hooper and Tony Prito, they use a boat to search for a secret tunnel at the base of the cliff. Frank and Joe try to rescue Mr. Hardy but they are also captured at gunpoint. Chet and Tony go to the United States Coast Guard and find Biff Hooper, Jerry Gilroy, and Phil Cohen there and lead them to the smugglers' secret cave.

It turns out that Mr. Jones was an informant working for the Coast Guard. At the end, the Hardys escape into the house on the cliff and capture Snattman while he is negotiating with police. Snattman apologizes and describes his life as difficult. His father died when he was young, and his uncle (owner of the house) was selfish and mean. After his uncle died, Snattman saw the opportunity to use the house for smuggling. As he knows that he will now be sent to prison, he wants the house to be used as a home for underprivileged boys.

Note that the front cover of the revised edition shows three boys in a boat, but in the text four boys are described as being in the boat (Joe Hardy, Frank Hardy, Chet Morton and Biff Hooper).

== Alternative version ==
In 2002, St. Martin's Minotaur published The House On The Point, an homage to "The House on the Cliff", by Benjamin Hoff. Hoff wrote this book as a tribute to Franklin W. Dixon and The Hardy Boys, who had provided him with much entertainment during his youth. He did this by taking the original 1927 edition and stripping out all the details to form an outline of the story similar to, in his opinion, the outline Leslie McFarlane would have received from the Stratemeyer Syndicate. He then reimagined the story using his own version of the familiar Hardy Boys characters, making many minor changes, such as the case which Fenton Hardy is investigating, and more significant changes to the characters and their personalities. For example, in this reimagined version Callie Shaw and Iola Morten play an active role in investigating the Polucca residence and Callie shows her concern for Frank by giving him a kiss on the lips. Note that this would not likely have been permitted in the original, for (as McFarlane writes in "Ghost of the Hardy Boys") Stratemeyer expected the girls to make only occasional appearances and to have relationships with the boys that "would not go beyond the borders of wholesome friendship and discreet mutual esteem."

== Adaptations ==
Walt Disney published a condensed and revised version of this story in their publication, Walt Disney's Magazine (1957 - 1958)

Filmation Associates made an 11-minute cartoon of this story in The Hardy Boys animated TV show features a condensed version of the plot of this book.

Seattle Children's Theatre put on a theatrical performance of the play, "The Hardy Boys in the Mystery of the Haunted House", which is based on this book. The script is available online here for purchase.

The episode, "The House on Possessed Hill" from The Hardy Boys/Nancy Drew Mysteries shares many elements from this book. Also, The Hardy Boys serial 2 contains some elements from this book as well.

== See also ==
- List of Hardy Boys books
