= The Secret of the Old Mill =

1927 book by Franklin W. Dixon

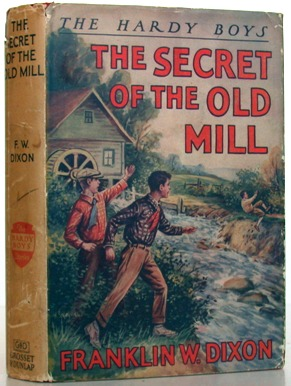
- Original 1927 edition
- Author: Franklin W. Dixon
- Language: English
- Series: The Hardy Boys
- Genre: Detective, mystery
- Publisher: Grosset & Dunlap
- Publication date: June 1, 1927, revised edition 1962
- Publication place: United States
- Pages: original edition 212, revised edition 174
- OCLC: 1718891
- Preceded by: The House on the Cliff
- Followed by: The Missing Chums

The Secret of the Old Mill is the third volume in the original Hardy Boys series of mystery books for children and teens published by Grosset & Dunlap. The book ranks 86th on Publishers Weekly's All-Time Bestselling Children's Book List for the United States, with 1,467,645 copies sold by 2001. This book is one of the "Original 10", some of the best examples of the Hardy Boys, and Stratemeyer Syndicate, writing.

This book was written by Leslie McFarlane in 1927 for the Stratemeyer Syndicate, who published it under the pseudonym Franklin W. Dixon. On January 1, 2023, the 1927 version entered into the US Public Domain, due to 2022 having been the book’s 95th year. However, the 1927 version is still under copyright in Canada until January 1, 2048, due to Canada using the author’s life plus 70 years model for works-for-hire. As Leslie McFarlane died in 1977, the last year for Canadian copyright on the 1927 version will be 2047. The 1962 version will enter the US Public Domain on January 1, 2058, and the Canadian Public Domain as late as January 1, 2067 (Alistair Hunter possibly died in 1996). Between 1959 and 1973 the first 38 volumes of this series were systematically revised as part of a project directed by Edward Stratemeyer's daughter Harriet Adams. In 1962, the original version of this book was rewritten in by Alistair Hunter, resulting in two different stories with the same title.

== Plot summary (revised edition) ==
The Secret of the Old Mill

Frank and Joe Hardy and their friend Chet Morton wait at a train station in their hometown of Bayport for Frank and Joe’s father. While there, they see a man jump on a departing train. Frank is 18, and Joe is 17. Their father is a famous detective and is returning from a business trip to Detroit. When he doesn’t arrive, the brothers assume he has been unexpectedly delayed and plan to meet a later train. In the meantime, the three friends go into town to pick up Chet’s new microscope.

Ken Blake, a teenager who works as a bicycle errand boy, is almost hit by a car. Frank, Joe and Chet help him. Joe gives Ken an envelope he dropped, noticing it is labeled confidential and is addressed to Victor Peters. Ken thanks the boys but is vague about where he works. Frank inspects Ken’s bike, and Ken tells him it came from Belgium.

When Chet pays for the microscope, the shopkeeper tells the boys that one of Chet’s $20 bills is counterfeit. The police have warned local shopkeepers about a counterfeit ring. Frank asks the shopkeeper if he can take the bill to study it and then turn it over to the police. The shopkeeper agrees. The shopkeeper lets Chet take the microscope and owe the balance.

Chet asks to borrow $20 from his father, a real estate agent. He tells the boys about the property outside of town that he sold to Elekton Controls. The company manufactures missile parts, and the land purchased includes an old mill. At Chet’s father’s suggestion, the company renovated the mill. As the boys are getting out of Chet’s car back in downtown Bayport, they see the man from the train station but are unable to catch him. The boys pay the balance due on the microscope and go to the police station.

At the police station, the three friends learn that other townspeople have also received counterfeit bills. The man Chet saw matches the police description of one of the suspected counterfeiters. The boys go back to the train station, pick up Frank and Joe’s father and head home. Mr. Hardy doesn’t think the counterfeit case is related to his case, but he offers to help his sons track down clues. He also tells them that Elekton is doing experimental work, in addition to manufacturing.

In the middle of the night, Joe hears someone on a bicycle leaving an envelope in the Hardy mailbox. He chases the person without success. Awakened by the noise, the Hardy family, including Frank and Joe’s visiting Aunt Gertrude, reads the note and then searches the yard for clues. The note warns of danger for the family if the Hardys don’t drop the case — but it doesn’t specify which Hardy or what case. Aunt Gertrude finds a bicycle pedal outside.

The next morning Mr. Hardy, Frank and Joe examine the note in the lab above their garage, but they don’t find fingerprints or a watermark on the paper. After the boys are finished, Chet picks them up to follow up on the bicycle pedal clue. One of Bayport’s store owners identifies the pedal as a Belgian bike part and suggests they try a store in the neighboring town of Bridgeport. The Bridgeport store owner did sell that style of bike pedal, but could only give a general description of the customer.

Frank, Joe and Chet go back to Bayport for an afternoon outing with Chet’s sister Iola and their friend Callie Shaw. Chet plans to apply for a job at Elekton, and then the group intends to have a picnic and explore the area by the river.

Chet is unsuccessful at getting a summer job at Elekton. The guard at the gatehouse discourages Chet from applying without an appointment and gives the group the impression that there aren’t any openings. As the group starts to leave the plant, Frank notices a bicycle that looks like Ken’s leaning against the mill’s south wall. He still has the pedal in his pocket from their morning sleuthing, and it matches the other pedal.

The maintenance man confirms that Ken does work there, but indicates Ken isn’t there at the moment. As the group leaves the property, Joe thinks he sees Ken’s face in the window. Frank and Joe go back to talk the maintenance man. He still insists Ken is not there. Ken walks home at night, leaving his bicycle on company property, which makes it easily accessible to anyone. The boys begin to wonder if Ken purchased a new pedal in Bridgeport.

After the picnic, Frank and Joe explore a cave and tunnel while Chet and the girls stay on the beach. The brothers’ exploring ends when an arrow with a note warning them to stop investigating is shot at Chet and the girls. After taking the girls home, Frank, Joe and Chet study the watermark on the warning note attached to the arrow and compare it to the note left at the Hardy home.

Frank and Joe trace the watermark to a company in Bridgeport. Chet researches the arrow and finds it is not new or unique. After Chet leaves, Frank and Joe notice several plant explosions in other cities reported in the papers. Someone places a threatening call to the Hardy home.

Frank and Joe plan to return to the picnic area later that night, but first the Hardy family drives to the water for a surprise for Frank and Joe. The brothers had been saving for a boat and brokered an agreement with their father. He surprises them with the Sleuth, their new motorboat.

Frank and Joe’s friend Tony Prito sees the brothers out on the water with their new boat and flags them down. Tony’s father was passed a counterfeit $20 bill at his construction supply yard. The customer drove a light green truck, and his passenger, a young man, paid the bill. In the back of the truck was a bicycle.

After dinner Frank and Joe take the Sleuth out to the cave they saw previously. While they are investigating, the boys are hit on the back of the head and knocked unconscious. They wake up on their boat, which is adrift. Their gas tank is empty, and the boat's oars are missing. The harbor police spot them and tow the boat in.

The next morning Frank and Joe take an object with a possible fingerprint to the police on their way to the paper store in Bridgeport. The paper store doesn’t sell to retailers, just industrial companies. Elekton Controls is one of those companies.

After lunch Frank and Joe meet Chet at the boathouse. Chet tells his friends that he talked directly to the personnel manager at Elekton Controls and got a summer job in the plant’s cafeteria. He also shows Frank and Joe a warning note left in his car. Frank and Joe take Chet out for a ride on the Sleuth.

When Joe is unable to decrease the boat’s speed or turn off the engine, Frank eventually manages to disconnect the distributor wires to stop the boat. A fellow boater pulls alongside and tows the Hardys' boat to the municipal dock. A mechanic looks at the boat; someone jammed the throttle open.

Back at the Hardys’ house, Frank, Joe and Chet examine the note left for Chet but don’t find any fingerprints. The three go out to the mill to talk to Ken, this time in Chet’s car. Ken starts running when he sees the boys approach. He trips and falls into a river. The three friends rescue Ken. He ran because the guard warned him against talking to the Hardys and their friends. Ken didn’t ride his bike to the Hardys in the middle of the night. He did go to Bridgeport to buy a new pedal when he noticed the pedal missing.

The guard and maintenance man approach the boys. They thank the boys for rescuing Ken, and the maintenance man ushers Ken inside for a change of clothes. As he does, a green truck comes on the property, and the guard lets it pass through the gate without stopping or showing any identification. The guard indicates to the boys that it is not a company truck but doesn’t give out any other information.

Frank and Joe go to the beach to warm up and dry off. Chet waits to try and talk to Ken again. Ken leaves for a delivery errand in Bayport on his bicycle, but the three friends don’t catch up to him. Deciding to go back to the mill, Joe calls their parents to let them know they won’t be home for supper. Frank and Joe’s father also won’t be home until late. The green truck the boys saw before passes them on the road and Joe sees the license plate number.

Minutes later, the boys hear an explosion at Elekton Controls. The three friends go to the plant. The police chief gives them permission to search the grounds, but won’t let the boys go into the buildings out of concern for their safety. They go home, and Chet relays stories his father has told him about the mill property deal with Elekton Controls. There was vandalism and sabotage at the plant when it was being built. Frank wonders if the green truck smuggled in explosives to the plant.

Frank and Joe’s father arrives home and fills the three boys in on his case. He is working for Elekton Controls to capture the saboteurs. He was in the lab building when the explosion occurred but was knocked out by the blast and unable to chase the intruders. He suspects the saboteurs have inside help for disconnecting the plant’s electronic alarms, but a screening of the employee records that day revealed nothing. Frank and Joe tell their father about the green truck they’ve seen and give him the license plate number. Their father calls the police chief with the information.

The next morning Frank and Joe realize that the printing on two of the warning notes is similar to the envelope they saw addressed to Victor Peters. They learn the fingerprint they found belongs to a man called “The Arrow,” who used to work at summer resorts teaching archery. The man has disappeared, but the police have a general description of him. The truck’s license plates were stolen.

Frank and Joe go back to the mill to talk to Ken. The guard tells them Ken is not employed there anymore but thinks he might still be in the area at the farmhouse where he rented a room. When they arrive at the farmhouse, it looks abandoned. The boys discover the green truck in the garage with no license plates. When someone locks them in the garage, the boys hot-wire the truck and break through the door.

They go back to the gas station, and the brothers ask about any other boardinghouses in the area. There is one, and Ken is there. He tells Frank and Joe that the maintenance man drove the green truck to Tony’s father’s construction supply yard. Ken came along to help load, and then also paid for the supplies. Ken didn’t realize that the cash he was given included a $20 counterfeit bill.

Ken hadn’t seen anyone with a bow and arrow. The man Ken routinely delivered confidential envelopes to, Victor Peters, turns out to be same man who passed a counterfeit $20 bill to Chet at the train station.

Worried about Ken’s safety, Frank and Joe invite him to stay at their house. Once at the house, Frank calls the police chief. After lunch, Frank calls Elekton Controls’ accounting department and finds out the company prints documents on-site. Frank thinks the guard and the maintenance man may be involved with the counterfeit ring and possibly the sabotage operation. Joe calls a meeting between Victor, the guard and the maintenance man.

Tony and Chet take observation posts near the gatehouse. Frank and Joe investigate the property and find an electronic sensor system in place that also incorporates mill wheel movement as a signal. Once past the perimeter of the property and inside the building, they find an interior room containing a printing press, counterfeit bills and a bow and arrow.

As they hear Victor, the guard and the maintenance man arrive, Frank and Joe hide in the room. The men realize they’ve been tricked. Afraid it is a sting operation, they start packing supplies to leave. The Hardys try to escape through a hidden tunnel, but the men chase the brothers and catch them.

The three men (Victor, the guard and the maintenance man) are the only members of the counterfeit ring and don’t know anything about the sabotage. They thought the Hardys were all working on the same case — the counterfeiting operation. A man named Paul Blum got them jobs at the plant with a side agreement for the green truck’s unquestioned access onto the property. He is coming that night to pay them, but doesn’t know about their counterfeiting operation. Frank and Joe think Paul is the mastermind behind the sabotage at the plant, has used the green truck to smuggle in supplies and has an inside connection.

The counterfeiters sent the warning notes, hit Joe and Frank on the head, shot the arrow at Chet and the girls and vandalized the Hardys’ boat. When Paul arrives, he takes credit for the plant explosion; his accomplices carried out the sabotage at the plant while it was being built.

When a noise outside the cave distracts their captors, Frank and Joe overpower them. Tony, Chet, the police and the Hardy boys’ father arrive. Frank and Joe show the group the hidden room, counterfeiting supplies and bow and arrow. Frank and Joe’s father indicates he identified the inside man, and he has been caught and taken to jail. Frank and Joe’s father thanks the boys and their friends for solving the counterfeit case and for helping him solve his case.
