= The Great Airport Mystery =

1930 book by Franklin W. Dixon

- Original edition
- Author: Franklin W. Dixon
- Language: English
- Series: The Hardy Boys
- Genre: Detective, mystery
- Publisher: Grosset & Dunlap
- Publication date: May 1, 1930 revised edition 1965
- Publication place: United States
- Media type: Print (hardback & paperback)
- Pages: 192
- Preceded by: The Mystery of Cabin Island
- Followed by: What Happened at Midnight
- Text: The Great Airport Mystery at Wikisource

The Great Airport Mystery is the ninth volume in the original The Hardy Boys series of mystery books for children and teens published by Grosset & Dunlap.

This book was written for the Stratemeyer Syndicate by Leslie McFarlane in 1930. Between 1959 and 1973 the first 38 volumes of this series were systematically revised as part of a project directed by Edward Stratemeyer's daughter Harriet Adams. The original version of this book was rewritten in 1965 by Tom Mulvey resulting in two different stories with the same title. The original version of this book entered the public domain in the United States in 2026; under current copyright laws, this marks the beginning of the trend of a single Hardy Boys book becoming public domain in the U.S. every year until 2050.

== Plot summary (revised edition) ==
While driving home the Hardy boys take a shortcut which results in a strange car crash and an encounter with an unfriendly stranger. The next day they are hired by Mr. Allen, the president of Stanwide Mining Equipment Company, under the guise of being factory messengers when in fact they are working undercover to investigate missing shipments of expensive mining equipment containing platinum.

The Hardy boys decide to quit their messenger jobs when it becomes clear that the gang is onto them. Instead they rent a plane and take aerial photographs of the area where their car crash occurred; however, their camera and exposed film are stolen before they have a chance to develop the pictures. Continuing to investigate the theft of their camera, as well as the theft of the mining equipment, they repeatedly see footprints and hear a voice belonging to Clint Hill, an aircraft pilot who is presumed dead after his plane crashed into the ocean, causing them to wonder if his ghost is somehow involved in the thefts.

After recovering their pictures the Hardy boys rent a helicopter and return to the area of the car crash, finding a large hidden cave and recovering the stolen shipments of equipment. Next the Hardy boys fly to a small Caribbean island, and then to Montana in pursuit of the criminals. Eventually they manage to apprehend all of the criminals involved and return to Bayport gratified at solving yet another mystery. Clint is revealed to be alive after all, having survived the crash and faked his death.

== Plot summary (original edition) ==
In the original version of this story on the way to the new Bayport Airport the boys are almost run over by Mail Pilot Giles Ducroy. Ducroy blames the boys because he lost his job and later he frames the boys for a mail robbery. Although they don't have an alibi they are bailed out of jail by Mr. Applegate (from The Tower Treasure) and Mr. Jefferson, the owner of Cabin Island (previous book). The Hardy boys overhear Ducroy and two other hoods planning a major air mail robbery. They find out that Ducroy and company bought an airplane and stow in the back of it to follow the hoods. When Ducroy and company try to steal a major payroll the Hardy boys manage to capture the thieves. The real pilot, whose plane was ruined by the thieves, ends up using the crooks' plane to deliver his cargo. The boys graduate from high school. They get rewarded since the information they had sent to their father clears the boys.

== List of characters ==
=== Hardy family and friends ===
Frank Hardy
Joe Hardy
Mrs. Laura Hardy
Miss Gertrude Hardy
Mr. Fenton Hardy

- Chet Morton
- Jerry Madden: Jerry Madden is a wiry, good-looking youth whose brother was a teammate of the Hardys on their school's varsity football squad. He is a pilot for the Stanwide Company. Jerry helps the Hardys several times on their case, including flying them to a Caribbean island near the end of the mystery.
- Iola Morton
- Callie Shaw
- Mrs. Morton
- Biff Hooper
- Bill Vogel
- Kurt Lerner
- Kyle Rodney
- Clint Hill
- Mr. Newcomer

=== Criminals ===
- Bush Barney: Bush Barney first appears right before a plane almost runs down the Hardy Boys. He has a card in Mr. Hardy's identification files as an ex-convict, which is where Frank Hardy finds out who Bush Barney is.
- Art Rodax: Art Rodax is the boss of the Hardy Boys when they take "summer jobs" (working undercover on a mystery) at the Stanwide Mining Equipment Company. Rodax is a heavy-set man with thinning hair, and a sour, belligerent expression.
- Lance Peterson: Lance Peterson is a man of average height, with sandy-colored hair and a hard, weathered face. He was the copilot on the plane that crashed with Clint Hill. Peterson was supposedly the only survivor. When he starts hearing Clint Hill's voice on the radio, he pleads the Hardys to find out who is doing it.
- Mike Zimm and Mrs. Zimm: Mike Zimm is a mechanic for the Stanwide Company. He plays a part in stealing platinum from the Stanwide Company. Mrs. Zimm, wife of Mike Zimm is unaware of his criminal activities.
- Aaron Lieber and Mrs. Lieber: Aaron Lieber is a copilot mechanic and a special pal of Lance Peterson. He is a bony-faced man with beady eyes. Later in the story, he and Peterson fly a Stanwide cargo plane without orders with intent to steal the cargo, but are apprehended. Mrs. Lieber, his wife, is a stocky, beautiful woman with a tremendous amount of blonde hair.
- John Unger: A shipping clerk and accomplice of Peterson and Lieber.
- Mack Carney: Crony of thieves.
- Anchor: Accomplice.

=== Allies ===
- Mr. Albert Allen: The owner of Stanwide who hires the Hardys to investigate.
- Lou Diamond: Lou Diamond is the tower chief at Bayport Airport. He is a stocky, good-natured man, with crew-cut red hair, but nevertheless has an air of authority. The Hardys consult him for information about a low-flying plane.
- Randy Watson: Randy Watson is a tall, lean man who pilots the Hardys when they go up in an airplane to take photos of a suspicious area.
- Mr. Freeman: Mr. Freeman is the owner of “Freeman’s Camera House”. He is a man of medium height with dark hair.
- Richard Tyson and Mrs. Tyson: Richard Tyson is a large, burly man who uses the name of “Mr. R. C. Williams” when he goes to pick up photos that are originally the Hardys. When scared by the mention of the police, he tells them his real name and that his neighbor, the real Mr. Williams, told him to pick up the pictures under his name.

=== In popular culture ===
The title of the novel was adopted by the progressive metal band The Great Airport Mystery, whose album The Great Spaceport Mystery was released May 7, 2013.
