= Footprints Under the Window =

Book by Franklin W. Dixon

- Original edition
- Author: Franklin W. Dixon
- Language: English
- Series: The Hardy Boys
- Genre: Detective, mystery
- Publisher: Grosset & Dunlap
- Publication date: February 1, 1933, revised edition 1965
- Publication place: United States
- Media type: Print (hardback & paperback)
- Pages: 192 (original) 177 (revised)
- Preceded by: While the Clock Ticked
- Followed by: The Mark on the Door

Footprints Under the Window is the twelfth volume in the original The Hardy Boys series of mystery books for children and teens published by Grosset & Dunlap.

This book was written for the Stratemeyer Syndicate in 1933, purportedly by Leslie McFarlane; however, the writing style is noticeably different from other books in the series known to have been written by McFarlane. Between 1959 and 1973 the first 38 volumes of this series were systematically revised as part of a project directed by Harriet Adams, Edward Stratemeyer's daughter. The original version of this book was rewritten in 1965 by David Grambs, resulting in two different stories with the same title.

== Plot ==
=== Original edition ===
When Frank and Joe try to take their laundry to the laundromat in order to clean up the house before Aunt Gertrude arrives, they learn that its owner has disappeared and has been replaced by a sinister Chinaman named Louie Fong. Later that day, the boys go down to the docks to meet their aunt, who mysteriously does not show up. While waiting, they meet a man who introduces himself as Sidney Pebbles, who gets locked into a telephone booth and, out of pity, is invited to spend the night at the Hardy home. The next morning, Mr. Pebbles has disappeared, along with some papers from Fenton Hardy's coat pockets, leaving only a set of footprints below the window. That night, they arrive home to find Aunt Gertrude on the floor, ill. She had accidentally overslept and had to arrive on the return voyage, making her a day late. Concerned, they hire a nurse, Mrs. Cody, to take care of her while she recovers. In the following days, the Hardy boys investigate a fight among Chinese men at the local docks, as well as meeting Orrin North, who had hired their father to clear his company name under accusations that he is involved in smuggling Chinese into America to avoid a head tax.

Later, the boys and Orrin North head to a Chinese restaurant named "Lantern Land" where Sidney Pebbles is working. To their surprise, a Sidney Pebbles is working there, with the same face but is not the same man. They overhear Pebbles talking to Tom Wat, a Chinese man who was stabbed in the dock fight, but miraculously survived, when someone releases a dog to attack Tom. The Hardy boys intervene and save the pair, also trying to help Tom and Sidney. During the course of their investigation, the Hardy boys hide Tom Wat by dressing him up as a woman and hiding him in their home. They also meet the real Mr. Pebbles and realize that they had been fooled by an imposter who lied to them in order to get into their house. The story concludes with the Hardy boys being held prisoner, along with their father, until Tom Wat is able to escape and get help, resulting in the people smugglers being arrested and the Hardy boys solving the mystery of who left the footprints under the window.

=== Revised edition ===
Frank and Joe attempt to uncover a plot to smuggle refugees from Baredo in the Huellas (a fictional island nation off the coast of French Guiana) into the United States, and the involvement of local magnate Orrin North. They also get involved with investigating attempts to spy on a top-secret satellite camera being built at a local company called Micro-Eye. Someone has managed to infiltrate security at the plant and has taken photos of blueprints.

Realizing that several clues point to the involvement of people from Baredo, Frank and Joe and their friend Chet Morton fly down to Cayenne, French Guiana, and then go by boat to Baredo in the nearby Huellas to investigate. What they discover is that Orrin North, while supposedly on the side of rebels against the dictator of Baredo, is actually double-crossing the rebels by finding out their identities and capturing them.

Returning to Bayport, the boys overhear a plot to steal the satellite camera the very next day, but they are captured and taken aboard a ship where they are locked into a hold being filled with water. They manage to escape from the hold with the assistance of their father, Fenton Hardy, who has been on the same case and went after this ship at the same time. They free the political prisoners on board, stop the theft at Micro-Eye, and capture the criminals with the assistance of the Coast Guard.
