= The Short-Wave Mystery =

Book by Franklin W. Dixon

- Original edition
- Author: Franklin W. Dixon
- Language: English
- Series: The Hardy Boys
- Genre: Detective, mystery
- Publisher: Grosset & Dunlap
- Publication date: March 1, 1945
- Publication place: United States
- Media type: Print (hardback & paperback)
- Pages: 192 pp
- Preceded by: The Melted Coins
- Followed by: The Secret Panel

The Short-Wave Mystery is the twenty-fourth volume in the original The Hardy Boys series of mystery books for children and teens published by Grosset & Dunlap.

This book was written for the Stratemeyer Syndicate by Leslie McFarlane in 1945. Between 1959 and 1973, the first 38 volumes of this series were systematically revised as part of a project directed by Harriet Adams, Edward Stratemeyer's daughter. The original version of this book was rewritten in 1966 by David Grambs, resulting in two different stories with the same title.

== Plot ==
=== Revised edition ===
The Hardy boys are drawn into a mystery when a group of thieves steals a collection of stuffed animals from an estate sale. Later, the Hardy boys notice a station wagon carrying stuffed animals, but when they try to give chase, the car gets away, leaving only a broken ham radio antenna behind. While they are discussing the case that their father Fenton Hardy is working on, they learn that he is after a group involved in industrial espionage and that this group uses code words very similar to what the boys have been hearing transmitted over the ham radio bands.

When the Hardy boys visit the estate to investigate the remaining stuffed animals, they are knocked unconscious and someone steals the remaining animals. They manage to get their hands on two of them and convince their friend Chet Morton, who has recently taken up taxidermy as a hobby, to open them up looking for whatever may be hidden inside. After the Lectrex plant is raided, the boys go with their father to investigate, and they notice a stuffed fox that had been on a ledge in the conference room has mysteriously disappeared.

The Hardy Boys travel to Canada (somewhere near Moosonee and Moose Factory) to solve the theft of the stuffed animals and to break up an industrial spy ring, which was the source of the leak of info coming from the Lectrex factory in their hometown of Bayport. As the boys piece together parts of this mystery, they solve the industrial spying case their father was working on, they solve the mystery of the coded transmissions on the ham radio bands, and they find out why a group was stealing the stuffed animals.

=== Original edition ===
The Hardy Boys hear a mysterious call for help on their shortwave radio set: "Help -- Hudson". Meanwhile, Fenton Hardy is investigating nation-wide thefts of radio equipment by a group of criminals called "The Hudson Gang". But of more immediate concern is the theft of several auction items, at an auction attended by Chet Morton and the Hardy Boys. The stolen items are mostly animal skins and carcasses intended for use in taxidermy, Chet's latest hobby.

Investigating all the seemingly unrelated mysteries leads to some connections. Spike Hudson, leader of the Hudson Gang, uses a house near Bayport as a hideout—a house which has vicious-looking stuffed animals hidden around it at strategic points to discourage unwanted snooping. At the house, Frank is caught by one of Spike's henchmen when he tries to bring the police. The man overpowers Frank and brings him into the house where he is questioned by Hudson. Hudson has the henchman imprison Frank in the basement, bound and gagged, while the criminals make their getaway. He is later freed by Joe. The "Help -- Hudson" message, though initially thought to be from or about Spike Hudson, seems to instead be from a group of stranded researchers trapped somewhere on the isolated coast of Hudson's Bay... near where Spike Hudson has another hideout. Soon, the Hardy Boys are travelling by plane to the fictional White Bear River in remote Northern Ontario, Canada (references in the book place it most likely somewhere near Moosonee and Moose Factory) to try to solve the thefts, rescue the researchers, and break up the Hudson Gang.
