= The Missing Chums =

Book by Franklin W. Dixon

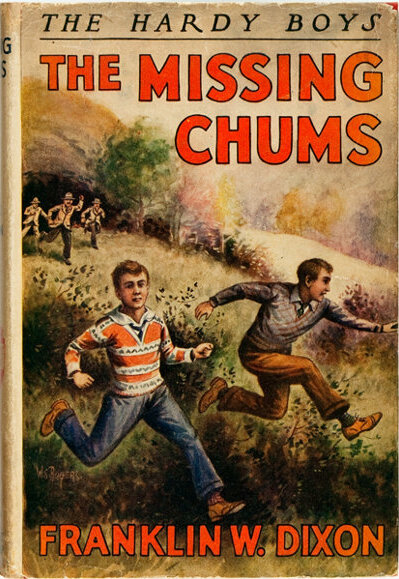
- Original 1928 edition
- Author: Franklin W. Dixon
- Language: English
- Series: The Hardy Boys
- Genre: Detective, mystery
- Publisher: Grosset & Dunlap
- Publication date: original edition 1928, revised edition 1962
- Publication place: United States
- Pages: 175
- OCLC: 1866271
- Preceded by: The Secret of the Old Mill
- Followed by: Hunting for Hidden Gold
- Text: The Missing Chums online

The Missing Chums is the fourth volume in the original The Hardy Boys series of mystery books for children and teens published by Grosset & Dunlap. The book ranks 108th on Publishers Weekly's All-Time Bestselling Children's Book List for the United States, with 1,189,973 copies sold as of 2001. This book is one of the "Original 10", generally considered to be the best examples of the Hardy Boys, and Stratemeyer Syndicate, writing.

The plot concerns the disappearance of the Boys' chums, Chet and Biff, when they take a motorboat trip down the coast. When Frank and Joe finally find them, they are all captured. In the end, they triumph over the bad guys on mysterious Blacksnake Island.

This book was written for the Stratemeyer Syndicate by Leslie McFarlane in 1928. Between 1959 and 1973 the first 38 volumes of this series were systematically revised as part of a project directed by Harriet Adams, Edward Stratemeyer's daughter. The original version of this book was rewritten in 1962 by James Buechler resulting in two different stories with the same title.

The original version of this title is noted for being the first Hardy Boys book in which Aunt Gertrude makes an appearance. The original version entered the public domain in the United States in 2024.

== Plot summary (revised edition) ==
At the beginning of the book the boys take their new boat, the Sleuth, out on the bay. While they are cruising on the bay another boat nearly rams them. They are unable to give chase because of a damaged steering mechanism on the boat, and the boys end up going around in circles. It turns out that the boat that nearly rammed them had a purpose for doing so, but the reason why is not revealed until the end of the book.

Soon after, the boys prepare to go to Callie Shaw's costume party. They inadvertently stumble upon another part of the unraveling mystery as they see some unknown men in Mr. French's Costume Shop, who appear to threaten him.

Returning home, the boys frighten their Aunt Gertrude with their costumes. (Aunt Gertrude is a recurring character in the series.) Soon the boys are off to the costume party on their motorcycles. On the way they realize that the bank is being robbed. They follow the criminals until they are lost at the docks, where they hop into a boat and escape into the fog.

After notifying the United States Coast Guard, the boys gain permission from Chief Collig to search for the criminals in the Sleuth, but the boys discover the Sleuth has been stolen. The boys search for the bank robbers in Tony Prito's boat, the Napoli, but are unable to find them in the thickening fog. The boys return home, explain to their father everything they saw at the bank and during the chase, and then head out to the costume party.

The next day the boys awaken to learn that Chet Morton and Biff Hooper never made it home from the party. The boys not only have to learn who stole the Sleuth, but where their missing friends went, and who robbed the bank. As the story develops the boys learn that expensive radios that may have been stolen are turning up.

The Hardys come up with a plan to trap the kidnappers. They confront the criminals at a store, but are then kidnapped themselves. Stark and Nick overpower, tie and gag them. The boys are driven to a shack. They manage to escape, in a spectacular sequence involving a fire.

Lastly, a hermit on a tiny island with a shotgun threatens the boys. While trying to find Chet and Biff, Joe and Jerry are captured and tied up in a cave. Soon Frank and the others rescue their friends and escape. The book ends saying that Frank and Joe would soon start a new case "in the near future while Hunting for Hidden Gold."

== Plot summary (original edition) ==
The original book opens with Chet Morton and Biff Hooper preparing for a week-long boating trip in Biff's new motorboat “panda” . As Frank and Joe are instructing Biff on the handling of the craft in Barmet Bay, another boat occupied by three men menaces them, nearly causing Envoy to collide with two sailboats. The Hardy Boys note that the three men were closely watching Chet and Biff, which becomes important later in the story.

The next day, an excited Chet and Biff leave for their boating trip on the Envoy. Both friend Tony Prito in his boat Napoli and Frank and Joe in their Sleuth decide to escort their friends to the end of the bay to see them off on their journey. Frank and Joe take Callie Shaw and Iola Morton as passengers. But before any of them reach the ocean, a violent squall strikes the bay and the Sleuth is forced to turn back to port, nearly capsizing. Soon after, Napoli also returns and Tony reports that Envoy did not turn back, and that Biff and Chet decided to press on through the storm. The boat was last seen headed out to the open ocean.

After three days with no word from their friends, Frank and Joe organize a search effort to find trace of them. Before they can begin, however, their plans are interrupted by the arrival of their Aunt Gertrude, who has come for an extended visit, and doesn't approve of "letting children go out in boats." With the approval of Mrs. Hardy, they eventually begin searching up the coast, accompanied again by Tony Prito in his Napoli. No villages up the coast have seen any sign of Biff's boat, though the boys do find some anonymous wreckage on a reef which leads them to believe that disaster struck the Envoy. They return home in defeat, and Chet and Biff are presumed dead by the community.

Several days later, however, their hopes are restored when Aunt Gertrude opens a letter addressed to her brother Fenton Hardy. It is from Baldy Turk's gang, who claim to have kidnapped Frank and Joe, and are demanding ransom for their return. Frank and Joe, obviously not kidnapped, deduce that gangsters must be holding Chet and Biff, mistakenly believing that they are the Hardy Brothers. At this time, Tony also remembers that Biff once mentioned going down the coast, to Blacksnake Island. After one misadventure where Frank and Joe believe they have spotted Chet on a schooner, the boys approach Blacksnake Island to see the same boat which had menaced them on the bay leaving it. They land on the island and search for signs of Chet and Biff, eventually finding them being held captive in a cave by Baldy Turk's gang.

After briefly freeing their friends, all the boys are recaptured, and hear news that Fenton Hardy has also been taken by the gang. They escape again, but Frank and Joe get separated from their friends once more in the darkness. They reach their boat, and steal the gang's boats as well, leaving the criminals stranded on the island with Chet and Biff.

The Hardys return with the authorities and round up the gang, finally releasing their friends from captivity. They return home to find that their father is also safe, and had arrested Baldy Turk while Frank and Joe had helped capture the rest of his gang.

== Mistakes on the Cover Illustration ==
The cover of the revised edition shows Frank and Joe spotting Chet and Biff in a distant boat as lightning strikes down. This scene takes place on page 139 of the revised edition. The image is sometimes confused with a similar scene in the original edition.
