= What Happened at Midnight =

1931 book by Franklin W. Dixon

- Original edition
- Author: Franklin W. Dixon
- Language: English
- Series: The Hardy Boys
- Genre: Detective, mystery
- Publisher: Grosset & Dunlap
- Publication date: May 1, 1931, revised edition 1967
- Publication place: United States
- Media type: Print (hardback & paperback)
- Pages: 173
- ISBN: 0-448-08910-6
- OCLC: 34771171
- Preceded by: The Great Airport Mystery
- Followed by: While the Clock Ticked

What Happened at Midnight is the tenth volume in the original The Hardy Boys series of mystery books for children and teens published by Grosset & Dunlap.

This book was written for the Stratemeyer Syndicate by Leslie McFarlane in 1931. Between 1959 and 1973 the first 38 volumes of this series were systematically revised as part of a project directed by Harriet Adams, Edward Stratemeyer's daughter. The original version of this book was rewritten in 1967 by Tom Mulvey resulting in two different stories with the same title.

== Plot summary (revised edition) ==
Joe and Frank are asked by their father Fenton Hardy to break into the house of a scientist and retrieve a secret invention and keep it safe from being stolen while he is away. The brothers successfully retrieve the device while at the same time thwarting an attempted burglary. The device turns out to be a small transistor-type radio with remarkably clear reception; their father sends a message to guard it carefully, so they hide it in the trunk of their car. The next day at an antique airplane show, Chet steps on the toe of a blond-haired man who becomes angry but flees when an onlooker states that the man was trying to eavesdrop on their conversation. Later, the brothers see the blond man, who accidentally dumps his briefcase contents when fleeing them.

From here the plot parallels in many ways the original plot, with minor changes and updates. At a party at Chet's later that night, the boys observe someone snooping around their car. Joe goes to investigate and disappears as the clock strikes midnight. As in the original, Frank and Chet search for Joe, but the trail eventually grows cold until a tip from Aunt Gertrude (of all people) leads to the caves along the bay off Shore Road. In this version, the bad guys are recast as both jewel smugglers and electronics thieves.

The New York sequence follows much as in the original version as well, although in 1967 the Hardys are less shy about calling family for help and thus do not have to hitch-hike back to Bayport after being robbed. Once the boys are back to Bayport, they find the gang's head honcho is working at the local jewelry store, and as in the original version they follow him to the airport. The use of bi-planes in the original is maintained in the new version by the device of having the Hardys contact an acquaintance who has an antique plane to help them chase Taffy Marr. Their parachute escape from the plummeting biplane, one of the dramatic set-pieces of the original version, is thus maintained in the new book.

As in the first book, Marr and the rest of the gang are rounded up late at night on the beach trying to bring in a load of hot diamonds.

== Plot summary (original edition) ==
This story opens with Chet Morton giving the Hardy boys and their chums a lesson on how to use the new automat which just opened in their hometown of Bayport. While jostling one another the boys bump into a blond haired man. Later, while wrestling with the boys from Crabb Corners, Joe Hardy falls against the blond man again, causing him to drop his package which is later revealed to contain diamonds he is smuggling.

That evening the Hardy boys attend a party at the Mortons' farm. While the clock is striking midnight Joe Hardy disappears without a trace. At first Frank thinks his brother is playing a joke on him but when he does not reappear Frank gets worried. Days later Frank and his chums manage to locate Joe, who has been kidnapped and kept hostage in a cave along the Shore Road.

The rest of the story deals with Frank and Joe traveling to New York City to unravel the mystery of the blond man. In New York they are pick pocketed and have to spend a night sleeping in a park, while listening to the clock strike midnight. Hitchhiking back from New York, the boys meet two Department of Justice men who are investigating a case of diamond smuggling. When they return to Bayport, the Hardy brothers locate who they believe to be Taffy Marr, the diamond smuggler. The Hardy boys chase him to the airport and then hire a plane to continue the chase; however the plane they hired has mechanical problems and crashes. After returning to Bayport they locate Taffy Marr again, and send a message for the Department of Justice men to come and help them make the arrest. Together with help from the Department of Justice men, the Hardy brothers manage to arrest Taffy Marr and the men he's been working with.

The story concludes with an informal party at the Mortons' farm again, with the boys recounting their adventures for their friends, while the clock strikes midnight again.

== What Happened At Midnight Free Book Online ==
What Happened At Midnight (1967 Version) - Full Text
