= The Secret of Skull Mountain =

Book by Franklin W. Dixon

- Original edition
- Author: Franklin W. Dixon
- Language: English
- Series: The Hardy Boys
- Genre: Detective, mystery
- Published: January 1, 1948; Grosset & Dunlap
- Publication place: United States
- Media type: Print (hardback & paperback)
- Pages: 212 pp
- ISBN: 0-448-08927-0
- OCLC: 19406194
- Preceded by: The Phantom Freighter
- Followed by: The Sign of the Crooked Arrow

The Secret of Skull Mountain is the twenty-seventh volume in the original The Hardy Boys series of mystery books for children and teens published by Grosset & Dunlap.

This book was written for the Stratemeyer Syndicate by George Waller Jr. in 1948. Between 1959 and 1973, the first 38 volumes of this series were systematically revised as part of a project directed by Harriet Adams, Edward Stratemeyer's daughter. The original version of this book was shortened to 177 pages in 1966 by David Grambs, resulting in two similar stories sharing the same title.

== Plot summary ==
The story begins when Joe wants to go swimming; however, Frank points out that there is not enough water because of a low reservoir. When they discover that the water at the Skull Mountain facility disappears each night, they team up with Chet Morton and engineers Dick Ames and Bob Carpenter to solve the mystery. While exploring Skull Mountain, the boys are attacked several times. They finally find Timothy Kimball Jr. (Sweeper) breaking into Kleng's plumbing store in order to steal the $5000 that Kleng owes him. Kimball is arrested and questioned about the reservoir. This leads the Hardy Boys to catch the villain, Kleng, and solve a crime which involves the Chicago syndicate being investigated by their father, Fenton Hardy.

== Characters ==
The main characters are the Hardy Boys: Joe Hardy, a 17-year-old and the son of world-renowned detective Fenton Hardy, and his 18-year-old brother, Frank. Secondary characters include Fenton Hardy, the boys' father, a local engineer named Bob Carpenter, his assistant Dick Ames, and the Hardy Boys' friend, Chet Morton. A local plumber, Kleng, organizes the crime with the support of the Chicago syndicate to drain the water from the reservoir, in order to keep local engineers from flooding their hideout. Timothy Kimball Jr. (Sweeper) is being paid to help carry out the plan. Dr. Foster, who was treated very badly, is another character who was kidnapped by Kleng's gang to test the tunnel in the mountain to see if enough cesium is present to justify mining it. Minor characters include Mrs. Kleng, who is aware of her husband's crimes, Callie Shaw (Frank's girlfriend, who does some undercover work for him), and three individuals living on the mountain (all involved with the gang some extent).
