= The Mark on the Door =

Book by Franklin W. Dixon

- Original edition
- Author: Franklin W. Dixon
- Language: English
- Series: The Hardy Boys
- Genre: Detective, mystery
- Publisher: Grosset & Dunlap
- Publication date: June 1, 1934, revised edition 1967
- Publication place: United States
- Media type: Print (hardback & paperback)
- Pages: 192
- Preceded by: Footprints Under the Window
- Followed by: The Hidden Harbor Mystery

The Mark on the Door is the thirteenth volume in the original The Hardy Boys series of mystery books for children and teens published by Grosset & Dunlap.

This book was written for the Stratemeyer Syndicate in 1934, purportedly by Leslie McFarlane; however, the writing style is noticeably different from other books in the series known to have been written by McFarlane. Between 1959 and 1973 the first 38 volumes of this series were systematically revised as part of a project directed by Harriet Adams, Edward Stratemeyer's daughter. The original version of this book was rewritten in 1967 by Tom Mulvey resulting in two different stories with the same title.

== Plot ==
=== Revised edition ===
While boating on Barmet Bay, the Hardy boys spot a periscope from a submarine and then nearly crash into a rented speedboat driven by a Mexican man named Pancho Cardillo. Mr. Cardillo later returns to the rental location and steals the speedboat, leading the boys on a search for the stolen boat. Cardillo then ditches the boat after his cronies knock out Frank and Joe. While investigating Mr. Cardillo, the boys find an Indian ring with a strange crest on it and Fenton Hardy receives a threatening letter telling him to "beware of the mark on the door!"

The Hardy boys, their father, and their friend Chet Morton fly to Mexico where they find a band of Indians and a strange oil smuggling operation using submarines. Their deductions lead them to a small Mexican town where they learn that local people are mysteriously disappearing and the strange crest appears on the doors of people who have disappeared. The Hardys find a local youth by the name of Tico who is a great navigator and helps the Hardy boys find the culprit's hideout where they learn the real man behind the scheme is Cardillo, who is called "Pavura", which means terror in Spanish, by the Indians.

In the end, the Hardy boys and their friend Chet manage to stop the smugglers from getting away and solve the mystery of the disappearing Indians, all while solving the oil smuggling case that their father was working on.

=== Original edition ===
The Hardy boys travel to Mexico to search for a missing witness in an oil stock swindling case.
