= The Dana Girls =

Series of young adult mystery novels

- Country: United States
- Language: English
- Publisher: Stratemeyer Syndicate

The Dana Girls was a series of young adult mystery novels produced by the Stratemeyer Syndicate. The title heroines, Jean and Louise Dana, are teenage sisters and amateur detectives who solve mysteries while at boarding school. The series was created in 1934 in an attempt to capitalize on the popularity of both the Nancy Drew Mystery Stories and the Hardy Boys series, but was less successful than either. The series was written by a number of ghostwriters and, despite going out-of-print twice, lasted from 1934 to 1979; the books have also been translated into a number of other languages. While subject to less critical attention than either Nancy Drew or the Hardy Boys, a number of critics have written about the series, most arguing that the Dana Girls' lesser success was due to the more dated nature of the series.

== Characters ==
The series' principal characters are Louise and Jean Dana, teenage orphans who solve mysteries while attending the fictional Starhurst School for Girls in Penfield, not far from their hometown of Oak Falls. When on vacation, the girls stay at the home of their guardians, their uncle, Captain Ned Dana, master of the S.S. Balaska, and his spinster sister, Harriet Dana. The household also includes a bungling maid, the "buxom, red-cheeked" Cora Appel, often teasingly referred to as "Applecore" by Jean and Louise. Louise is seventeen at the beginning of the first novel. She is described as dark-haired, while her sister Jean is fair-haired. Louise is the more serious of the two, while Jean is described as "gay-hearted." In the second book, Jean is described as being a year younger than Louise, with "blonde, boyish-cut hair" and with "laughter in her blue eyes and a humorous tilt to her nose."

At school, the Dana girls are firmly under the control of the headmistress, Mrs. Crandall, who approves absences from class and other exceptions to the rules only when deemed absolutely necessary to the girls' detective work; however, as the series progresses and mysteries are solved to the benefit of the school, this becomes more and more frequent. One early example is Mrs. Crandall granting permission to the girls to conduct a search for a missing teacher, Miss Tisdale, in The Secret at Lone Tree Cottage. Mrs. Crandall often volunteers herself or her husband to assist with investigations, either by driving them, chaperoning them, or at times, actively engaging in activity such as spying from horseback. Her husband, the bookish Mr. Crandall, is usually occupied in his study and generally takes no interest in administrative affairs, although he is considered an excellent teacher. It is rumored that Mr. Crandall is engaged in writing a monumental English-language history of Ancient Greece in five volumes and he is usually left alone by the student body, but the Dana girls discover he can be a useful source of obscure facts relating to the clues in a mystery. He generally takes a less active role in sleuthing than his wife, acting as a driver, escort, or researching a clue academically. He is sometimes referred to, without explanation, as Professor Crandall.

The Starhurst School for Girls is sited on the former Starr family estate; avenues cross a broad lawn to the former Starr mansion, which now serves as the school dormitory. The last remaining Starrs have fallen into poverty; elder brother Franklin Starr does what he can to ensure that younger sister Evelyn is at least able to attend school in the family's former home. When Franklin is unable to fund his sister's full tuition, Evelyn is reduced to waiting tables in the school dining hall in order to continue in attendance; this makes her the target of school bully Lettie Briggs, below.

The Dana girls' principal recurring antagonists are the school bully, Lettie Briggs, the wealthiest girl at Starhurst, and her lackey, or shadow, Ina Mason, who is Lettie's only friend. Lettie and Ina frequently attempt to solve the Dana girls' cases themselves while throwing their rivals off the scent; these attempts invariably fail and redound to Lettie and Ina's profound discredit. Lettie becomes angry in the first volume upon not receiving the room assignment of her choice, which is instead assigned to the Danas, and serves as a rival (unsuccessfully) and prankster. Most of her pranks are to discredit the Danas scholastically, athletically, morally, or slander their detective skill. Lettie alters or steals school assignments, plagiarizes their work, destroys academic research, puts acid on Jean's towel before an athletic competition (to injure her hand), jeers/cheers against the Danas, short-laces shoes, hires a thug to disrupt an ice skating competition and winter carnival, and spreads rumors of all kinds about the Danas, along with making other character slurs. Incredibly, based upon their academic performance and favored status, Mrs. Crandall remains neutral, or at times, becomes angry with the Danas, and requires the sisters to make an explanation. In most circumstances, she is immediately satisfied with her investigation. This usually serves to delay Dana sleuthing, or to provide sub-plots with schoolgirl pranks in retaliation, on Lettie. Lettie, on the other hand, despite her disruptive, dishonest, and at times, actual criminal behavior, rarely receives due punishment. Lettie, despite receiving a large allowance, is miserly and invariably haggles; this costs her possession of the eponymous study lamp in the first volume in the series, By the Light of the Study Lamp.

The girls drive a "family roadster" whose make is not specified in the early books. Typical for the time, it has a starter button on the floor. This roadster is kept at Uncle Ned's house, and the girls do not drive it to school; instead, they take the train to and from campus, or else Uncle Ned comes and picks them up when he is not at sea. The girls know how to ride horses, and have access to horses kept in the school barn, and keep riding breeches in their room. In one of their adventures, they ride in a rented boat piloted by their Uncle Ned.

== Series history ==
Readers of NANCY DREW need no assurance that the adventures of resourceful Louise Dana and her irrepressible sister Jean are packed with thrills, excitement, and mystery. Every girl will love these fascinating stories which tell how the Dana girls, like Nancy Drew herself, meet and match the challenge of each strange new mystery.

Blurb on the jacket flap of The Mysterious Fireplace

The Dana Girls series was created by Harriet Adams, who sought to capitalize on the popularity of both the Nancy Drew and the Hardy Boys series. The series was produced by the Stratemeyer Syndicate, a book packager specializing in children's series books, and heavily marketed as similar to the Nancy Drew series; the same pseudonym, Carolyn Keene, was used for both.

All books in the series were published by Grosset & Dunlap and written by a number of ghostwriters under the supervision of the Syndicate. The first four titles were written by Leslie McFarlane, who also wrote 19 of the first 25 volumes in the Hardy Boys series. McFarlane, however, disliked the job intensely, only writing the fourth volume after requesting and receiving a higher fee than usual. He declined to write any further titles, writing afterwards that "starvation seemed preferable." McFarlane's antipathy towards the series stemmed largely from his discomfort from writing about two girls under a female pseudonym. Adams assigned the series next to Mildred Benson, who was also writing the Nancy Drew series. Benson also did not particularly enjoy writing the series, stating at one point that "I never felt the same kinship with the Danas that I did with Nancy." Benson nonetheless wrote volumes 5 through 16 before Adams began writing the series in 1955 with The Ghost in the Gallery. Adams wrote all subsequent volumes in the series, although at least one other title, Strange Identities, was written by Harriet's daughter, Camilla McClave, but never published. The Thousand Islands Mystery is mentioned as the Danas' next mystery at the end of Strange Identities.

=== Publication history ===
The series went out of print twice before going out of print for a final time in 1979. The Dana Girls Mystery Stories began publication in 1934 and were discontinued in 1944. The series went back in print in 1949, although new titles were not published until 1952. At that time, the books' jacket art was updated, from stylized, art deco designs to pictures of the Dana Girls finding a clue or chasing a suspect. Although the art on many of these early volumes is less detailed than that of Nancy Drew and other Stratemeyer publications, the sisters are usually shown in a far more active role, rather than hiding and spying on the action. In 1962, the books were changed to picture cover format, but with the same artwork.

The books have also been translated into Swedish, Norwegian, Danish, Finnish, German, and French. In Finland, girls have kept their original names. In Sweden, the Dana Girls are no longer Jean and Louise, but Mary and Lou. In France, they are known as Les Sœurs Parker ("The Parker Sisters"), Liz and Ann. In Germany, they are Barbie and Susan.

== Critical assessment ==
Unlike Nancy Drew, the Dana Girls have garnered little critical attention. Some find the series simply uninteresting and argue that the Dana Girls series was not as successful as Nancy Drew at least in part because early series authors Leslie McFarlane and Mildred Benson were uninterested in their creations. Others have called the characters "pallid followers in the dazzling train of Nancy Drew" and suggest that the series was less successful than the Nancy Drew Mystery Stories because of its melding of the mystery story with the boarding school story, a genre that was "fading in popularity" even in the 1930s. The combination of genres has also been called unsuccessful because "the school's presence weakens the mysteries, as the mysteries detract from the school story."

Bobbie Ann Mason criticizes the series, The Secret of the Swiss Chalet in particular, for "[realizing] the authorized, glamourized dreams of our culture" by having the Dana Girls live privileged lifestyles. Carolyn Carpan, in contrast, argues that series such as the Dana Girls that were begun around the time of the Great Depression portrayed heroines as unrealistically wealthy in order to fulfill readers' fantasies. Carpan also argues that the Dana Girls' detective work was an outgrowth of the Depression in another way; many jobs and activities previously reserved for men were increasingly taken by women in 1930s due to economic necessity.

== Titles ==
=== First series ===
1. By the Light of the Study Lamp, 1934
2. The Secret at Lone Tree Cottage, 1934
3. In the Shadow of the Tower, 1934
4. A Three-Cornered Mystery, 1935
5. The Secret at the Hermitage, 1936
6. The Circle of Footprints, 1937
7. The Mystery of the Locked Room, 1938
8. The Clue in the Cobweb, 1939
9. The Secret at the Gatehouse, 1940
10. The Mysterious Fireplace, 1941
11. The Clue of the Rusty Key, 1942
12. The Portrait in the Sand, 1943
13. The Secret in the Old Well, 1944
14. The Clue in the Ivy, 1952
15. The Secret of the Jade Ring, 1953

16. Mystery at the Crossroads, 1954
17. The Ghost in the Gallery, 1955
18 .The Clue of the Black Flower, 1956
19. The Winking Ruby Mystery, 1957
20. The Secret of the Swiss Chalet, 1958
21. The Haunted Lagoon, 1959
22. The Mystery of the Bamboo Bird, 1960
23. The Sierra Gold Mystery, 1961
24. The Secret of Lost Lake, 1962
25. The Mystery of the Stone Tiger, 1963
26. The Riddle of the Frozen Fountain, 1964
27. The Secret of the Silver Dolphin, 1965
28. Mystery of the Wax Queen, 1966
29. The Secret of the Minstrel's Guitar, 1967
30. The Phantom Surfer, 1968

=== Second series ===
The first 13 titles are simply reissues of previously published novels.

1. The Mystery of the Stone Tiger, 1972
2. The Riddle of the Frozen Fountain, 1972
3. The Secret of the Silver Dolphin, 1972
4. Mystery of the Wax Queen, 1972
5. The Secret of the Minstrel's Guitar, 1972
6. The Phantom Surfer, 1972
7. The Secret of the Swiss Chalet, 1973
8. The Haunted Lagoon, 1973
9. Mystery of the Bamboo Bird, 1973
10. The Sierra Gold Mystery, 1973
11. The Secret of Lost Lake, 1973

12. The Winking Ruby Mystery, 1974
13. The Ghost in the Gallery, 1975
14. The Curious Coronation, 1976
15. The Hundred-Year Mystery, 1977
16. Mountain-Peak Mystery, 1978
17. The Witch's Omen, 1979
18. Strange Identities, unpublished
19. The Thousand Islands Mystery, unpublished
