= The Phantom Freighter =

1947 book by Franklin W. Dixon

- Original cover
- Author: Franklin W. Dixon
- Language: English
- Series: The Hardy Boys
- Genre: Detective, mystery
- Publisher: Grosset & Dunlap
- Publication date: January 1, 1947
- Publication place: United States
- Media type: Print (hardback & paperback)
- Pages: 192 pp
- Preceded by: The Secret Panel
- Followed by: The Secret of Skull Mountain

The Phantom Freighter is the twenty-sixth volume in the original The Hardy Boys series of mystery books for children and teens published by Grosset & Dunlap.

This book was written for the Stratemeyer Syndicate by Amy McFarlane, the wife of long time Hardy Boys author Leslie McFarlane, in 1947. Between 1959 and 1973, the first 38 volumes of this series were systematically revised as part of a project directed by Harriet Adams, Edward Stratemeyer's daughter. The original version of this book was shortened in 1970 by Priscilla Baker-Carr, resulting in two similar stories sharing the same title.

== Plot summary ==
The Hardy brothers embark on a freighter trip under mysterious circumstances and find themselves involved with a smuggling ring. The Hardy Boys discover that the Phantom Freighter is really a smuggling ship used to smuggle counterfeit documents, illegal drugs, cowhides, and electric motors.

=== Aunt Gertrude's carton ===
Enigmatic stranger Thaddeus McClintock arrives in Bayport and engages Frank and Joe Hardy to arrange for a relaxing trip for him (with the Boys to accompany him) with the mysterious promise of “I’ll pay all expenses and when the trip is over you’ll be paid. Money, if you like. Or something else.” Meanwhile, Aunt Gertrude has arrived and announced that she is going to be living in the Hardy household long term. The shipping company incorrectly delivers one of her cartons, delivering instead a box apparently of raw wool addressed to a Mr. Johnson to the Hardy's address. After expressing her anger at the shipping company as the carton contains valuable family papers, Aunt Gertrude sends the boys to the address marked on the box to swap the packages. Arriving at the remote farm, the boys find nobody home but the barn ablaze. Frank breaks into the barn to rescue a carton believed to be Aunt Gertrude's, only to find out it contained discarded newspapers. The owner of the barn arrives and is shocked to find that someone had been staying at his house and having packages delivered while he was out of town. After getting a description of the man who signed for the package from the delivery driver, the boys spot a man matching that description at a clothing store and follow him to the docks where he disappears.

=== Going fishing ===
Later, after reviewing several other modes of travel with Mr. McClintock, the boys suggest a cruise on an oceangoing freighter, to which Mr. McClintock is receptive. The boys then try repeatedly to book passage on freighters scheduled through Bayport, but are rebuffed at every turn. The travel agency they attempted to work through, owned by Mr. Klack, seems more interested in keeping them off ships than arranging their passage. Even when the boys are successful at obtaining tickets through an out-of-town travel agency, an unknown individual posing to act on their behalf picks up their tickets, again preventing them from setting sail. At the suggestion of loyal Hardy friend Chet Morton (who is trying his hand at fly-tying), the boys and Mr. McClintock employ local fishing captain Harkness to take them on a fishing expedition. Captain Harkness agrees to take the trip, provided they avoid Barmet Shoals as he recently spotted a phantom freighter there that left him spooked and shaken. After landing a monstrous tuna to the delight of Mr. McClintock and heading back to Bayport, their boat runs out of gas to the disbelief of Captain Harkness. As night falls, the party on the boat is horrified to see a freighter cutting through the sea toward them, only to go silent and dark. Though the boys try hard to locate the ship, it is neither heard or sighted again and has disappeared by first light. Rescue comes from a coastal patrol aircraft and ship the next day.

=== Mysteries in Bayport ===
Meanwhile, numerous other break-ins are discovered in and around Bayport during which nothing was stolen from unoccupied houses, but packages are delivered and signed for by people unknown to the owners. Fenton Hardy reveals that he is working on a case of forged historical documents which have been appearing in the rare document trade. They also make several run-ins to the express office, where the manager, Mr. Nixon, was kind enough to help the Hardys along their mission for their aunt's lost carton.

Aunt Gertrude takes a trip to Bridgewater, evasively answering questions about where and why she is going. The boys follow her to Bridgewater and find her meeting with an elderly woman the boys previously identified as one of the people involved in the package delivery scheme.

=== Taking a cruise ===
The boys recruit their friend Biff Hooper to help them book passage, which turns to their advantage as an out-of-town travel agent arranges their cruise aboard the Father Neptune. Meeting Captain Gramwell of the Father Neptune, the boys learn that one crew member recently left the ship ill and a new hand had been hired. Suspicious, the boys investigate and find the crewman had in fact been kidnapped and the new hand was sent to interrupt the trip. Captain Gramwell reacts quickly and has the new crewman, recognized by the boys as part of the smuggling ring, arrested and questioned to find his missing crewman, who is recovered.

Mr. McClintock, the boys, Biff, and Chet board the Father Neptune in Southport. At sea, the cargo aboard the Father Neptune suddenly shifts, leaving the ship listing badly and in danger of sinking. The crew and passengers rush to redistribute the cargo, eventually restoring the ship upright.

The boys tell Captain Gramwell about the smuggling ring and phantom ship. Captain Gramwell has the ship's radio operator contact all the ships in the area and discovers that the Lion Tamer spotted just such a ship nearby. Spotting the ship at nightfall, the Father Neptune pursues the mystery ship, identified as the Black Gull, but is unable to overtake it, much to the frustration of Captain Gramwell as the Father Neptune is declared to be the fastest ship in those waters and the mystery ship is obviously older and slower. That night, the mystery ship is again sighted, dark and apparently adrift. Along with the Father Nepture's radio operator Sparks, the boys row over to the ship while the Father Neptune keeps a spotlight on the mystery ship to hide the rowboat. This scene is depicted on the cover of the book. Upon boarding the mystery ship, the party finds the ship seemingly abandoned, but are suddenly jumped by the ship’s crew and captured.

=== Captivity ===
Held captive with Sparks aboard the Black Gull by the chief smuggler Crowfoot, the boys pretend to cast in with the smuggler. Crowfeet tells the boys about the ship’s secret repeller belts around the hull which hold off any motorized vessel or aircraft, allowing the Black Gull (under many different names) to escape from much faster ships and explaining how the boys adrift in the fishing boat were able to get so close with the fishing boat's engine shut down due to fuel exhaustion. After the Black Gull's radio operator falls ill, Crowfeet presses a seemingly reluctant Sparks into service to send messages. The boys then take turns sending coded messages via innocent-sounding nursery rhymes to their father, including the line “sailing, sailing, over the bounding main, for many a sailing ship can go faster…". Soon a sleek racing sloop under full sail (immune to the effects of the repeller, which only affects motor vessels) approaches and quickly overtakes the slow freighter. Coast Guard officers board and rescue the boys, Sparks, and the captured scientists who had been kidnapped and forced to work for the smuggler. Among them is a chemist who had developed the techniques used to artificially age paper to supply forged documents for sale in the antique / rare document market. The elderly “smuggler” Mitchell turns out to be Mr. McClintock's former business partner and is happily reunited with Mr. McClintock aboard the Father Neptune. With Mitchell rescued, the entire design for the repeller belt is recovered and Mr. McClintock and Mitchell agree to turn the design over to the US Government. The boys, Chet, Biff, and Mr. McClintock then continue their cruise to the Caribbean.

The reader learns that the Hardy Boys' next mystery will be The Secret of Skull Mountain.
