= The Hidden Harbor Mystery =

1935 book by Franklin W. Dixon

- Original edition
- Author: Franklin W. Dixon
- Language: English
- Series: The Hardy Boys
- Genre: Detective, mystery
- Publisher: Grosset & Dunlap
- Publication date: June 1, 1935, revised edition 1961
- Publication place: United States
- Media type: Print (hardback & paperback)
- Pages: 219
- Preceded by: The Mark on the Door
- Followed by: The Sinister Signpost

The Hidden Harbor Mystery is the fourteenth volume in the original The Hardy Boys series of mystery books for children and teens published by Grosset & Dunlap.

This book was written for the Stratemeyer Syndicate in 1935, purportedly by Leslie McFarlane. However, the writing style is noticeably different from other books in the series known to have been written by McFarlane. Between 1959 and 1973, the first 38 volumes of this series were systematically revised as part of a project directed by Harriet Adams, Edward Stratemeyer's daughter. The original version of this book was rewritten in 1961 by James Beuchler resulting in two different stories with the same title.

The original story contained racial stereotypes which were removed during the revision. For example, the chief villain, a young black man named Luke Jones is described in the 1935 edition as "the worst scoundrel we have ever come across", but is completely removed from the 1961 version, and most characters identifiable as black have been reworked as racially ambiguous.

== Plot summary (revised edition) ==
The Hardy boys meet Mr. Bart Worth who is the editor of the Larchmont Record. He explains that Mr. Samuel Blackstone has sued him for printing a story accusing his ancestors of being pirates. Mr. Worth also tells the Hardy boys about the long-standing feud between the Blackstone and the Rand families over ownership of a pond in Larchmont.

The Hardy boys accept Mr. Worth’s case and, along with their friend Chet Morton, drive to Georgia. Once they have set up a camp on the beach between the two properties, the boys begin to investigate the Rand and Blackstone estates. They are surprised to find a ‘sea monster’ in the pond and to witness Mr. Rand being hit over the head with a vase by Mr. Blackstone. Moments later, they find the vase intact and Mr. Rand missing. They also discover that the disputed pond had in the 19th century been a harbor (the Hidden Harbor of the title) used by pirates before a hurricane cut off its access to the ocean.

Despite the efforts of their enemies, the Hardy boys manage to find Mr. Rand and recover a treasure chest containing historical records which prove that the accusations Mr. Worth made in his article were all true. The feud is settled when Mr. Rand and Mr. Blackstone decide to work together to harvest the valuable cypress trees from Hidden Harbor.

== Plot summary (original edition) ==
The story begins with the Hardy boys and their pal Chet Morton returning to Bayport on a small coast liner from Larchmont where they had procured handwriting samples from Miss Pennyweather for a case on which their father, Fenton Hardy, was working. During a storm, they meet Mr. Samuel Blackstone who tells the boys that he is carrying a large sum of money. Shortly thereafter, the ship runs aground and Mr. Blackstone is knocked down and badly hurt. Joe and Chet manage to swim to shore but Frank Hardy goes missing as he stayed behind to assist the injured Mr. Blackstone.

Shortly after Frank is located, the three boys are arrested on charges of robbing Mr. Blackstone. The Hardy boys immediately suspect Mr. Ruel Rand of robbing Mr. Blackstone and set out to track him down. Recording the license plate of a car that they see him get into, they learn he lives in Hidden Harbor. The Hardy boys visit the wreck of the Resolute where they attempt to retrieve the handwriting samples. However, their boat drifts off and they are detained by the Coast Guard before they are able to reach their stateroom. After returning to land, they are questioned by the district attorney at Mr. Blackstone’s bedside. There they learn about the long-standing feud between the Blackstones and the Rands.

Chet and the Hardy boys travel south to Hidden Harbor to retrieve new handwriting samples from Miss Pennyworth as well as to investigate who stole Mr. Blackstone’s money. While there, they are followed by a detective and their campsite is vandalized. They also stumble across a ‘secret society’ of young black men being led by Luke Jones, a servant to Mr. Blackstone. This group of Negroes kidnaps Mr. Rand’s mentally insane brother who manages to turn the tables on them by stealing their revolvers. Eventually, the Hardy boys manage to find and disarm the brother. They also capture Luke Jones and make him confess to stealing Mr. Blackstone’s money and his diamond ring. He further admits to being responsible for inciting more hatred between the two families. The Hardy boys also manage to gather indisputable evidence which solves their father’s case without the need for replacement handwriting samples.
