= A Figure in Hiding =

Book by Franklin W. Dixon

- Original edition
- Author: Franklin W. Dixon
- Illustrator: Paul Laune (1937); John Leone (1965)
- Language: English
- Series: The Hardy Boys
- Genre: Detective, mystery
- Publisher: Grosset & Dunlap
- Publication date: May 1, 1937, revised edition 1965
- Publication place: United States
- Media type: Print (hardback & paperback)
- Pages: 212 pp (1937) 192 pp (1965)
- ISBN: 0-448-08916-5 (reissue)
- Preceded by: The Sinister Signpost
- Followed by: The Secret Warning

A Figure in Hiding is the sixteenth volume in the original The Hardy Boys series of mystery books for children and teens published by Grosset & Dunlap.

This book was written for the Stratemeyer Syndicate by Leslie McFarlane in 1937. Between 1959 and 1973 the first 38 volumes of this series were systematically revised as part of a project directed by Harriet Adams, Edward Stratemeyer's daughter. The original version of this book was rewritten in 1965 by James D. Lawrence resulting in two different stories with the same title

== Plot summary (revised edition) ==
While leaving the baseball field the Hardy boys are approached by a blind peddler with a warning for their father Fenton Hardy. Then the boys take their boat, the Sleuth, out on Barmet Bay for a ride and to watch the testing of a new hydrofoil boat named the Sea Spook. While admiring the new boat they almost collide with it, allowing them a reason to board the boat where they find a glass eye, presumably belonging to a Mr. Lambert, who was test driving the boat when the near collision happened. When the boys try to track down Mr. Lambert he goes missing and Bill Braxton, the owner of the Sea Spook, is attacked at his boathouse and the Sea Spook is ransacked, apparently to recover the glass eye. Meanwhile, Fenton Hardy examines the warning from Henry Zatta, the blind peddler (who is really only just blind in one eye but pretending to be blind because he is undercover), and declares that it must be a warning to keep away from the Goggler Gang. Mr. Hardy realizes "Mr. Lambert" is actually a hoodlum named Spotty Lemuel.

The Hardys receive a visit from wealthy investor Zachary Mudge, currently staying at the nearby Doc Grafton's Health Farm. Mr. Mudge wants to purchase the Sea Spook. The boys visit a local movie theater, but just as they arrive they see a man wearing the disguise of the Goggler Gang running away with the cashbox. They catch the man, but he escapes before the police arrive. Later, the boys travel upriver in the Sleuth to speak to Mrs. Lunberry, who has lost a valuable Indian artifact, the Jeweled Siva, stolen at a New York dealer's shop, and are followed by someone who draws an "evil eye" image on her home. They then visit Doc Grafton’s Health Farm, where their chum Chet Morton has taken a job. They keep seeing suspicious vehicles, including a green Torpedo V-8 sedan. The clue about the green Torpedo leads them to Izmir Motors, owned by Malcolm Izmir. On the property of Mr. Izmir’s house, the Hardys are treed by dangerous Doberman Pinschers, but a butler calls the dogs off and lets the Hardys in to talk to Mr. Izmir, who has been receiving threatening notes and plans a boat trip to calm his nerves. At home they find their house burglarized and their father's safe damaged, and their Aunt Gertude tied up and gagged.

Chief Collig reveals the Bijou holdup man was actually Nick Cordoza, and that he had broken into the estate of Mr. Izmir, who refused to press charges. The boys also learn from Mr. Mudge that the Izmir syndicate is on the brink of financial collapse. Mr. Izmir's disappearance from the ship is aided by the Sea Spook, which was taken by the gang to return him secretly to the health resort, which conceals criminals getting plastic surgery to alter their faces. With the help of their father, now incognito at the health resort, the Hardys and Chet realize that Mr. Izmir runs the Goggler Gang using intimidation and superstition about the evil eye. The glass eye is the gang's secret communication device. All gang members (including Doc Grafton) are captured by the Hardy brothers and the Bayport police, who are alerted by Chet. Their father is freed from imprisonment, and the Jeweled Siva recovered.

== Plot summary (original edition) ==
The boys (Frank, Joe, and Chet) go see a movie called "A Figure in Hiding" at the local Rialto Theater. After the film is over, the Rialto is robbed, with the thief getting away with $900. Then the boys go to the Bayport Hotel and meet up with their father, Fenton Hardy. They spy on a pair of men (Rip Sinder and Spotty Lemuel) in the room next door, part of a cruel gang called the "Eye Syndicate", run by a bogus doctor named Grafton performing fraudulent eye operations on unsuspecting victims. While Sinder and Lemuel are preparing letters to prospective victims, Sinder's daughter barges in and begs him to come home. Lemuel, trying to get her to leave, reveals to her that she was adopted, something that Sinder had kept secret from her. This works and Virginia runs away in a fit of despair and sorrow. Not long after that, the police mistakenly arrest their friend Chet for the robbery. It was really committed by Nick Cordoza, whom the boys found in his car unconscious. Chet runs away to Boston instead of going back home, following directions from a note supposedly from the Hardy boys to go there and wait for them. Later, their father devises a plan to trap Grafton by telling one of his clients (Henry Zatta) to pay with marked bills. However, the plan falls apart after Grafton recognizes his long lost father, causing him to flee and leave behind the $500 in marked money. Eventually, the boys find Virginia at an auto garage, where they attempt to prevent her from escaping, only to be caught in an auto accident. Grafton and his mute assistant Zeb find them and attempt to bury them alive but the Hardy boys fight them off. The boys are able to make it out of Grafton's cellar and the police show up to arrest the criminals. When the case is solved, Virginia is reunited with her grandmother, one of the victims of Grafton's fraudulent medical operations.
