= Brian McFarlane =

Canadian television sportscaster

- Born: August 10, 1931 (age 95); New Liskeard, Ontario, Canada
- Education: St. Lawrence University
- Occupations: Sportscaster, author
- Spouse: Joan McFarlane
- Children: 3
- Father: Leslie McFarlane

Brian McFarlane CM (born August 10, 1931) is a Canadian television sportscaster and author. He is best known as a broadcaster on Hockey Night In Canada and as an author of hockey books. He is also the honorary president of the Society for International Hockey Research.

== Early life and education ==
Brian McFarlane, the son of writer Leslie McFarlane, was raised in Whitby and Ottawa Ontario.

He attended St. Lawrence University in Canton, New York, on a hockey scholarship, graduating in 1955. In his four years he scored 101 goals for the Skating Saints, which remains a St. Lawrence record. On three occasions, he scored five goals in a game, a school record shared with several others. McFarlane was honoured as an All-American in 1952.

== Career ==
After graduating, he worked in television at WRGB in Schenectady, New York, before moving to CFRB Radio in Toronto, Ontario and then CFCF-TV in Montreal, Quebec (where he was sports director) and CFTO TV in Toronto. He had a lengthy career in broadcasting and journalism.

=== National Hockey League broadcasting ===
He is best known as a color commentator and studio host on Hockey Night in Canada, beginning in 1964. He made similar broadcasts on NHL games for the major American networks CBS, NBC, and ESPN. He was a colour commentator on Toronto Maple Leafs local telecasts until 1980, when he made on-air comments that were supportive of Leaf captain Darryl Sittler and critical of Leafs owner Harold Ballard. He was subsequently banned from the Maple Leaf Gardens press box. For Hockey Night in Canada, he was moved off Toronto games at this point, broadcasting the Montreal Canadiens and Winnipeg Jets (original team) games as the host. His last year with HNIC was 1991, ending a 28-year association with HNIC.

==== Peter Puck connection ====
McFarlane is often incorrectly cited as the creator or father of the cartoon character Peter Puck. The cartoon puck, which appeared on both NBC's Hockey Game of the Week and CBC's Hockey Night in Canada during the 1970s, was actually the creation of NBC executive Donald Carswell, although McFarlane had significant input. The character itself and the animation footage was created by NBC's production partner, Hanna-Barbera. After the network stopped carrying NHL hockey, McFarlane purchased the rights to Peter Puck from Hanna-Barbera and continued to promote the character.

=== Writing career ===
As of 2010, McFarlane had written 96 (with one in the works) books on hockey, selling over 1.3 million books. His first book, 50 Years of Hockey (Pagurian Press) was published in 1968 and he continues to write about hockey. McFarlane is an expert on hockey history and has compiled several volumes of NHL lore titled It Happened in Hockey, a 1999 series detailing the colourful history of the Original Six NHL teams, and "Proud Past Bright Future," the history of Women's Hockey (1994, Stoddard, ISBN 0-7737-2836-8). He published two memoirs, Brian McFarlane's World of Hockey (2000, Stoddart Publishing, ISBN 0-7737-3263-2) republished as Colour Commentary (2009, Key Porter, ISBN 978-1-55267-600-4) and From The Broadcast Booth (2009, Fenn, ISBN 978-1-55168-327-0). In 2008, he began a youth fiction series The Mitchell Brothers which always features hockey in the plots.

== Personal life ==
Throughout his career, McFarlane collected many memorabilia, photos, and objects focusing primarily on hockey history. In 2006, Brian sold most of his hockey collection to the Municipality of Clarington, where it became Total Hockey, a multimedia, interactive museum located at the Garnet B. Rickard Recreation Complex in Bowmanville. The museum was closed in 2007 and the collection was sold to an Edmonton-based collector in 2013. Plans for the collection have not been made public, but McFarlane was assured by the purchaser that the collection would be preserved and made available to the public at some point.

From his teenage years, McFarlane was interested in painting. In semi-retirement he began painting regularly producing several hundred paintings, mostly in the Group-of-Seven style of Canadian landscapes. He became an accomplished painter, exhibiting professionally.

== Recognition ==
- 1995 inducted into the media section of the Hockey Hall of Fame
- Admitted into the Ontario Sports Hall of Fame.
- Admitted into the Ottawa Sports Legends Hall of Fame
- Admitted into the Whitby Sports Hall of Fame
- Admitted into the St. Lawrence University Hall of Fame
- 27 November 2020 - Appointed as a member of the Order of Canada (CM), 2022, for his contributions to the sport for "well over a half century"

== Bibliography ==
- 50 years of hockey, 1917-1967: an intimate history of the National Hockey League, 1967
- Peter Puck: Love That Hockey Game!, 1975
- 60 years of hockey: the intimate story behind North America's fastest, most exciting sport : complete statistics and records, 1976
- McFarlane, Brian (1984). Brian Mcfarlane's NHL Hockey 1984. McClelland and Stewart. ISBN 978-0-7710-5431-0.
- One hundred years of hockey, 1989
- It Happened in Hockey, 1991
- More, It Happened in Hockey, 1993
- Still More, It Happened in Hockey, 1994
- The Leafs, 1995
- Clancy: The King's Story, with King Clancy, 1997
- Brian McFarlane's History of Hockey, 1997
- The Red Wings, 1998
- The Best of It Happened in Hockey, 1998
- The Rangers: Brian McFarlane's Original Six, 1999
- Stanley Cup Fever: More Than a Century of Hockey Greatness, 1999
- Hockey for Kids: Heroes, Tips, and Facts, 1999
- The Bruins, 2000
- The Ultimate Hockey Quiz Book, 2000
- Brian McFarlane's World of Hockey, 2001
- Real Stories from the Rink, with Steve Nease, 2002
- The Blackhawks: Brian McFarlane's Original Six, 2002
- Leslie McFarlane's Hockey Stories (two volumes), with Leslie McFarlane, 2005–2006
- Best of the Original Six, 2007
- From the Broadcast Booth: A Career in the World of Network Hockey, 2009
- Legendary Stanley Cup Stories, 2009
- Golden Oldies, 2015
- A Helluva Life in Hockey, 2021
