= The Secret Warning =

Book by Franklin W. Dixon

- Original edition
- Author: Franklin W. Dixon
- Language: English
- Series: The Hardy Boys
- Genre: Detective, mystery
- Publisher: Grosset & Dunlap
- Publication date: June 1, 1938
- Publication place: United States
- Media type: Print (hardback-(US, Canada, British Commonwealth) & paperback (never released in Canada or the US in this format))
- Pages: 192 pp
- Preceded by: A Figure in Hiding
- Followed by: The Twisted Claw

The Secret Warning is the seventeenth volume in the original The Hardy Boys series of mystery books for children and teens published by Grosset & Dunlap.

This book was written for the Stratemeyer Syndicate in collaboration by John Button and Leslie McFarlane in 1938. Between 1959 and 1973 the first 38 volumes of this series were systematically revised as part of a project directed by Harriet Adams, Edward Stratemeyer's daughter. The original version of this book was rewritten in 1966 by James D. Lawrence resulting in two different stories with the same title.

== Plot ==
=== Revised edition ===
On a stormy night, the Hardy boys receive a visit from Captain Early who tells them the story of Red Rogers, the ‘Jolly Roger’, and Whalebone Island, where the ghost is said to haunt. The next day, the boys receive a map in the mail showing a red 'X' on Whalebone Island. They assume this is a treasure map so they, along with their friend Chet Morton, go to meet their father and explore the island. As they approach, they see the abandoned lighthouse flashing a warning to them in Morse code. On the island, they find their father who tells them about a solid gold bust of an Egyptian Pharaoh which was owned by Mr. Zufar. While it was being shipped to America aboard a freighter named Katawa, the ship sank and Mr. Zufar is making an insurance claim for one million dollars. However, the insurance company has received a tip that the head was not on the ship when it sank and Mr. Zufar is trying to defraud them.

The Hardy boys end up on the salvage ship that is sent to search the Katawa, which happens to be sunk very close to Whalebone Island. While they are on board, they notice another salvage ship in the area as well. Once the diver is lowered to the sunken ship, he finds that someone else has already been there and stolen some of the ship’s equipment. On a later dive, the diver is nearly killed when a squid triggers a booby trap that was intended for him.

The boys leave the salvage ship when they receive notice that their father has gone missing. They return to shore and locate their father and the missing Pharaoh’s head and put a stop to a plan by Mr. Zufar to sell the real head while also collecting the insurance for the head which was supposedly sunk. In the end, while the bad guys nearly capture them, the rival divers come to their rescue, having earlier revealed that they were searching for a U-boat sunk by Captain Early during World War II. As a result of an earlier rescue the boys performed, the divers were going to give them a share of the treasure and had come to do so when they found them in trouble. While the mystery is solved, the boys discover that the money the other divers were after is actually counterfeit.

=== Original edition ===
The Hardy Boys meet up with a professional diver by the name of Roland Perry, who is employed by the Crux Brothers diving company. After the boys rescue Perry from a mishap on the water, they lend him one of their father's suits, and Perry heads off to his next job at nearby Bailey's Landing. But the suit happened to contain important notes for the case that the elder Hardy was working on, so he sends the boys to retrieve them. Along the way, they run afoul of two thugs, Bock and Simon.

After retrieving the notes, the boys stick around to help Perry raise a yacht belonging to a wealthy businessman. In the process, they become entangled in Perry's bitter feud with another diver, Gus Bock, the unscrupulous owner of a rival diving company. Kuntz employs the thugs Bock and Simon, and repeatedly tries to sabotage Perry's diving operations, putting Perry's and the boys' lives at risk. Mysterious notes left at the Hardys' hotel serve as the eponymous secret warnings, foretelling misfortune, but the boys are undaunted.

At length the yacht is raised, and Perry moves on to his next job: searching for treasure in the sunken ocean liner Katawa off of Reed's Point. They enlist the aid of eager photographer and inventor Earl Chipsley and his remarkable underwater X-ray motion picture camera. But the second mate of the Katawa, Clark Hornblow, institutionalized after having gone mad at the time of the wreck, insists the riches are elsewhere, having been stolen by other officers using a lifeboat. What's more, Kuntz and his henchmen will stop at nothing to claim the gold and diamonds for themselves. The Hardys are beset by dangers above and below the surface of the sea as they attempt to secure the Katawa's fantastic treasure.
