= The Hardy Boys: The Hidden Theft =

2008 video game

- North American Windows cover art
- Developer(s): XPEC Entertainment
- Publisher(s): The Adventure Company
- Producer(s): Mike Adams
- Composer(s): Joshua R. Mosley
- Platform(s): PC, Wii
- Release: September 30, 2008 (Windows); September 29, 2009 (Wii)
- Genre(s): Adventure
- Mode(s): Single-player

The Hardy Boys: The Hidden Theft (originally to be titled The Hardy Boys: The Tower Treasure) is the first title in The Hardy Boys PC game series created by JoWood Productions and The Adventure Company. It was based on The Tower Treasure, the first book in the book series. The game was released September 30, 2008. A sequel was made called The Hardy Boys: The Perfect Crime; this game was critically panned.

== Plot summary ==
The Spencer Mansion vault is robbed, and the Bayport Police call on brother detectives Frank and Joe Hardy for help. They soon find themselves in the middle of a major criminal investigation that takes them out of their hometown, Bayport, and into New York City. But the pieces don't add up, and Frank and Joe become embroiled in a drama of sinister proportions, and begin to suspect the recent theft is somehow linked to something from the past.

The game featured Jesse McCartney as the voice of Frank Hardy, and Cody Linley as the voice of Joe Hardy.

== Critical reception ==
Metacritic, which uses a weighted average, gave the game a score of 51 out of 100, based on 8 critic reviews. IGN said the game "just doesn't deliver". They noted that the game had "substandard sound, art and level design, and it just doesn't gel." Nintendo World Report's Pedro Hernandez wrote that the "game has severe issues", and "while its intentions are good, the exploration and puzzle-solving suffer from poor planning and execution."

Just Adventure gave the game a B+. Nick Brakespear from PC Zone disliked the game, rating it 22%, and sarcastically referring to the brothers as, "Red Arms Boy" and "Shit Hair Boy". Russian magazine Gameland scored the game 7.5/10.
