= By the Light of the Study Lamp =

1934 novel by Carolyn Keene

- Author: Carolyn Keene
- Language: English
- Series: The Dana Girls
- Genre: Children's literature/Young adult literature
- Publisher: Grosset & Dunlap
- Publication date: 1934
- Followed by: The Secret at Lone Tree Cottage

By the Light of the Study Lamp is the first book in The Dana Girls detective series, originally produced by the Stratemeyer Syndicate. It was issued in 1934, as part of a three-volume release in order to test the market for the series.

== Characters ==
- Louise Dana – a seventeen-year-old brunette, the elder and more serious of the sisters
- Jean Dana – Louise's younger sister, a blonde, the more light-hearted of the sisters
- Captain Ned Dana (Uncle Ned) – the girls' uncle and guardian, a sea captain
- Harriet Dana (Aunt Harriet) – the girls' spinster aunt
- Cora Appel – the Dana family's clumsy live-in maid; teasingly called "Applecore"
- Ben Harrow – the Dana family's hired man
- Franklin Starr – mysterious, itinerant scion of the déclassée Starr family
- Evelyn Starr – Franklin's younger sister; her family once owned the mansion that is now Starhurst School for Girls
- Mrs. Crandall – the Starhurst School's headmistress
- Mr. Crandall – an absent-minded teacher at the school; husband to Mrs. Crandall
- Mrs. Grantland – a woman whose suitcase is taken on the train the girls are riding back to school
- Fay Violette – a mysterious woman who keeps re-appearing in various guises; initially, her name is unknown to the girls
- Jake Garbone – a second-hand goods dealer whose car is spotted driving away from the initial theft of the girls' study lamp
- Lettie Briggs – the richest girl at Starhurst and the girls' nemesis
- Ina Mason – Lettie's only friend and follower
- Amanda – the school's African-American cook
- Doris Harland – a school friend, who informs the girls that there is a rumor that Evelyn Starr may not be returning to school
- Margaret Glenn – another friend, Doris's roommate
- Nell Carson – another school friend who is returning to school on the same train as the girls
- Ann Freeman – another school friend present for the train ride
- Sarah Gray – age fifteen, an Oak Falls friend, who wishes to attend Starhurst
- Sam Gray – brother of Sarah, football star, proponent of local, public high schools

== Plot ==
Louise and Jean Dana, orphaned sisters living in the town of Oak Falls, receive the gift of an antique study lamp as a parcel from their Uncle Ned Dana, skipper of the SS Balaska, as they are packing to return to their school in nearby Penfield for a second year. While the girls are distracted, having gone to the aid of their clumsy maid, Cora "Applecore" Appel, the lamp is stolen from their home, and though the sisters give chase in the family roadster, their search reaches a dead-end at an antique store run by the sinister Jake Garbone.

Jean, who finds Garbone's car and shop after the sisters split up to search the side streets, accuses Garbone of being the thief, but he denies this. While in his shop, Jean observes a mysterious woman peeking through the curtains behind the counter. She informs Louise of this, and they walk past the shop again, observing the same mysterious woman peeking at them from behind the curtains and then disappearing. The girls decide that the police can be of no help to them without further evidence, and they must solve the mystery for themselves.

On the way home, the girls encounter a handsome man of about thirty-five who asks them for directions to their uncle's house before being distracted when a passing truck strikes his dog, knocking it into the nearby Oak River. In attempting to rescue the dog, the man himself falls in and is knocked unconscious. The river leads to the treacherous Oak Falls, and the quick-acting Jean rescues the dog by leaning out over a rock and extending her hand, while thoughtful Louise first gets a rope from the trunk of their roadster and ties it around her waist so that she can swim out to rescue the young man without being swept away by the current; Jean pulls on the rope to assist while her sister gradually swims both herself and the victim to shore. Upon recovering consciousness, the young man appears to have partial amnesia.

The girls take the young man home in the roadster, since that was where he was heading before his fall. Aunt Harriet and Cora Appel are in the kitchen, busy preparing for the girls' farewell party. Both are surprised by the soaking wet stranger: clumsy "Applecore" drops the tray of cookies she was preparing, while Aunt Harriet sends for the family's hired man, Ben Harrow, and has him carry the stranger to Uncle Ned's unoccupied bedroom, and sends for a physician to attend the young man in a house call. The party goes on as planned, with five boys and five girls invited to the party. The girls' local friend Sarah Gray expresses her wish to go to Starhurst too, when her brother, star Oak Hill High School halfback Sam Gray, cuts in and attempts to begin a debate on the merits of public coeducational high schools like his own, versus private all-girl schools like Starhurst, when all are interrupted by a loud noise upstairs. This proves to be caused by Uncle Ned wrestling with the nearly-drowned stranger. Uncle Ned, having arrived home from port in New York, where he ended his latest sea voyage, earlier than expected, noticed that there was a party going on, and decided to sneak upstairs to freshen up and change before joining the festivities. This awakened the stranger from a nightmare with no knowledge of where he was, and he tackled Uncle Ned out of fear. Ned recognizes the stranger as his friend Franklin Starr, and wants to know how he came to be in the house. After cleaning up, the captain and Starr join the party, where both they and the guests learn the story of the river rescue from the Dana girls.

After their guests have left, the girls and Uncle Ned continue their discussion with Franklin Star. The girls learn that Ned and Franklin became friends after the latter traveled several times on the steamer commanded by their uncle. They also learn that Franklin's grandfather built the Starhurst estate, which the Starr family had to sell after a number of financial setbacks. The property was purchased by the Crandalls, who converted the estate into Starhurst School for Girls. The girls in turn inform Franklin and their uncle about the theft of the lamp, and their encounter with Jake Garbone.

The next morning, Uncle Ned drives the girls and their guest into town, determined to confront Jake Garbone about the theft of his gift to the girls. When they arrive at Garbone's shop, they find it has been locked up and cleared out — to all appearances, permanently closed. Franklin Starr asks to be dropped off at the train station, saying that he has important business to attend to, and using the excuse of his ongoing headaches making him poor company, which helps to blunt Uncle Ned's objections. The girls are suspicious of Franklin's behavior, given that when they first met him, he was walking to their home, and has no luggage with him to take on his trip to an unspecified destination. Franklin returns from the ticket counter with a ticket for a later train, but suddenly excuses himself when he spies a man leaving the waiting room; the girls instantly recognize the man as Jake Garbone, who boards the currently departing train before Franklin can catch him. The girls query Franklin, who, realizing that the man he recognized and knows by a different name is the suspected thief, Jake Garbone, pretends that he made a mistake, and didn't really know the man he had just been pursuing. Franklin says that he must take the next train so that he can meet with his lawyer. The Danas leave Franklin at the station and return home to pack.

Back at Starhurst school, the girls win the ire of rich girl Letitia Briggs, when they are awarded the nicest study in the school, the former Starr mansion library on the second floor. Lettie attempts to use the influence of her father's large fortune to persuade Mrs. Crandall to reassign the room to her, to no avail. They go into nearby Penfield antique stores, hoping to find a replacement lamp for their new study. By chance they encounter another antique lamp, alike in every detail. The girls seize the opportunity and buy the lamp, unaware that in doing so they have further alienated Lettie Briggs. They have also attracted the attention of a mysterious gypsy woman whom they will soon meet again — in the company of none other than Jake Garbone. Garbone and the gypsy woman are intent on regaining possession of the lamp, and Jake especially will stop at nothing to get it back. In the meantime, a strange handyman is found lurking repeatedly. As the girls try to solve the mystery of the lamp, they unearth little-known secrets about the history of their school and their schoolmate, Evelyn Starr, while staying one step ahead of their pursuers, and find the key to the missing Starr family jewels and a missing Starr sibling.

== Printings ==
The book was originally orchid colored with green endpapers, and art deco silhouettes, with a four-color jacket featuring vignettes on the cover in apple green, lilac, black, and white. Printings through late 1936 had a frontispiece and three internal illustrations on glossy paper. Only the frontispiece was retained from 1937 forward. The jacket was later printed in turquoise, red, black and white, with the same illustration, and finally, the binding of the book changed to blue with maroon endpapers, to match the jacket. After 1943, the illustration was printed on plain paper. The series ceased printing in 1945 for four years.

The 1949 edition of the book featured a new cover in the full-color wrap style used on Nancy Drew, the Hardy Boys, and other Grosset and Dunlap series. The first four volumes of the Danas were reintroduced with new jacket art and frontispieces, but no spine symbols or numbering. The books were green with Jean and Louise illustrated on a haunted path at night on green endpages. The series drew interest again so subsequent volumes were updated and released, with spine symbols, until the publication of a new volume (already written and set for printing in 1945) in 1952; new volumes were released once a year.

In 1962, the Dana Girls switched to cream or beige spined picture covers, and went out of print in late 1968. By the Light of the Study Lamp was allowed to go out of print at that time.
