= Hunting for Hidden Gold =

1928 book by Franklin W. Dixon

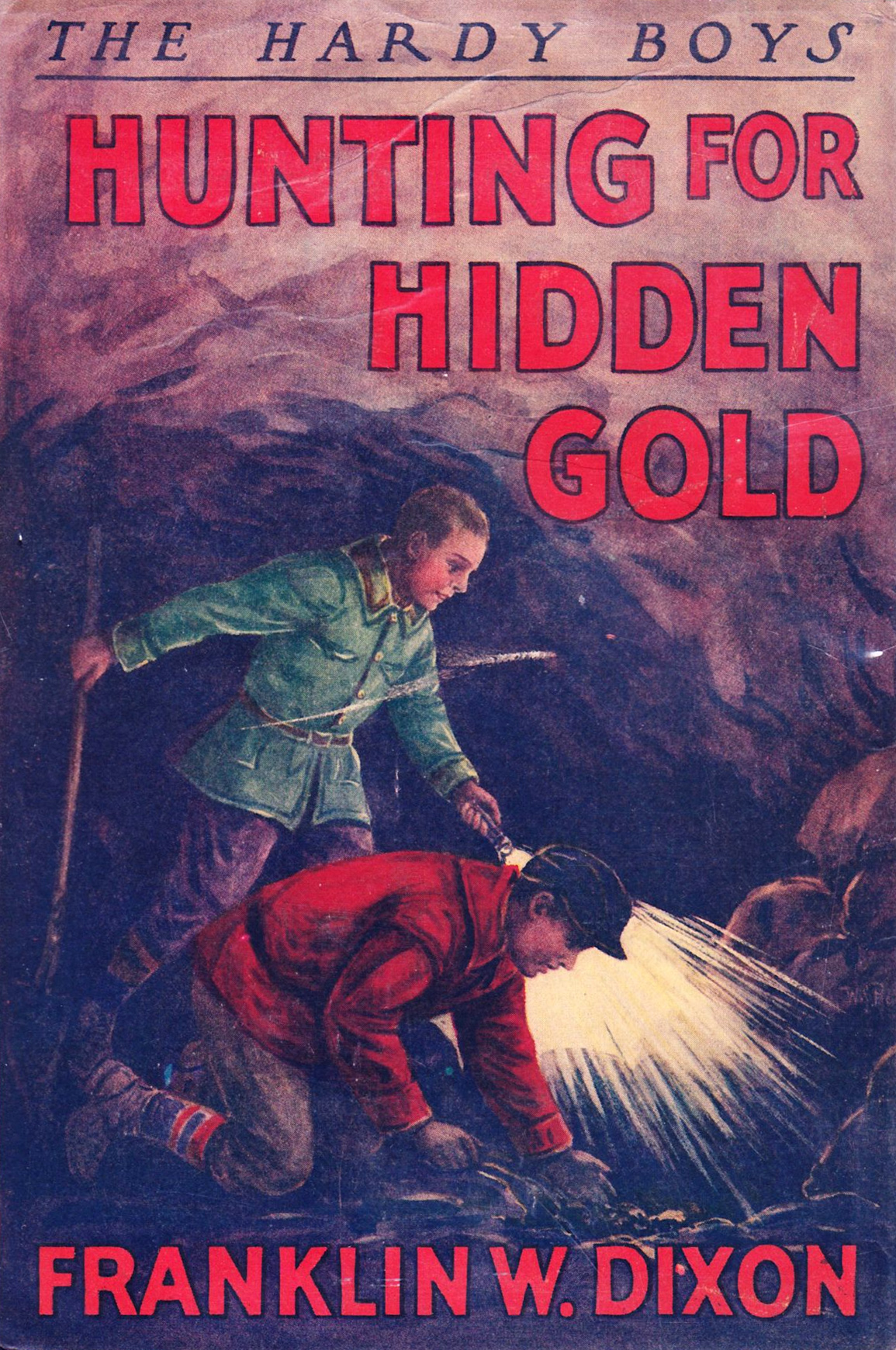
- Original 1928 edition
- Author: Franklin W. Dixon
- Language: English
- Series: The Hardy Boys
- Genre: Detective, mystery
- Publisher: Grosset & Dunlap
- Publication date: May 1, 1928, revised edition 1963
- Publication place: United States
- Media type: Print (hardback & paperback)
- Pages: original edition 214, revised edition 177
- ISBN: 9780448089058
- OCLC: 2531131
- Preceded by: The Missing Chums
- Followed by: The Shore Road Mystery
- Text: Hunting for Hidden Gold at Wikisource

Hunting For Hidden Gold is the fifth volume in the original The Hardy Boys Mystery Stories published by Grosset & Dunlap. The book ranks 111th on Publishers Weekly's All-Time Bestselling Children's Book List for the United States, with 1,179,533 copies sold as of 2001.

The plot concerns the theft of gold from a mining camp in Montana in winter. At first the case is being worked on by Fenton Hardy but when he becomes injured he invites his sons Frank and Joe to join him. After overcoming many obstacles the Hardy boys recover the stolen gold and turn the outlaws over to the Sheriff.

This book was written for the Stratemeyer Syndicate by Leslie McFarlane in 1928. Between 1959 and 1973 the first 38 volumes of this series were systematically revised as part of a project directed by Harriet Adams, Edward Stratemeyer's daughter. The original version of this book was rewritten in 1963 by Alistair Hunter resulting in two different stories with the same title. The original version entered the public domain in the United States in 2024.

== Plot summary (revised edition) ==
The Hardy Boys head to Montana to help their father who had been working on a case and broke his ribs. They go to the village of Lucky Lode and find a mystery connected to a man they saved, who had been shot by careless hunters in the beginning of the book. The man they saved had his gold stolen; when he was in Lucky Lode mining, he suspected one of his partners who was trying to save the gold had disappeared. When in Lucky Lode, they meet Mr. Burke who owns the general store; they later learn he is a spy called "Slip Gun", working for Big Al, the villain. They defeat Big Al who was known as Black Pepper when the man they saved lived in Lucky Lode. While hunting for the hidden gold the Hardy Boys spot a cave, so they head into it to search for clues to where the gold might be, but they run into a pack of wolves before they find any clues and have to find a way to get out of the cave. They also find Bart Dawson is Bob Dodge, the man who flew them to Montana, who is revealed to have had amnesia. They end up recovering the gold and round up all the bad guys in the story.

== Plot summary (original) ==
While their father Fenton Hardy is in Montana working on a case of missing gold the Hardy Boys go skating on Shallow Lake with their friends Chet Morton and Jerry Gilroy where they meet Jadbury Wilson, a poor old man who is also a former gold miner from Montana. Wilson tells them his tale of how Bart Dawson, a trusted member of his party, ran off during a gun fight taking four bags of their gold with him for safekeeping but failed to return once the gunfight ended. Upon returning to the Hardy home, with the injured Jadbury Wilson, the Hardy boys receive a telegram from their father requesting that they join him in Montana immediately.

After a stranger, claiming to be Mr. Hardy's lawyer, ushers the boys onto the wrong train, resulting in their being kidnapped and later escaping, the Hardy boys decide to continue their journey in disguise, finally arriving at Lucky Bottom, Montana to meet with their father. He tells them that they are looking for gold which Bart Dawson claims was stolen from him by an outlaw named Black Pepper and his gang. The next day, while searching for the gold, the Hardy boys are attacked by the gang of outlaws; however they manage to escape and return to town for the night. The following day they manage to catch one member of the gang who gives them information about Black Pepper. Upon searching, they discover a cabin used by Black Pepper, and there they find a map to the hidden gold, indicating it is buried in The Lone Tree mine.

While exploring the mine the Hardy boys are attacked by a pack of wolves that chase them down another shaft which happens to be the main mine entrance and the first landmark on the map they found in Black Pepper's cabin. Following the map, the Hardy boys recover the gold which leads to them being attacked by Black Pepper himself. They manage to get the upper hand and march back to town with both the outlaw and the gold, to later learn that Bart Dawson had believed Jadbury Wilson was dead and now that he knows differently he is willing to share the recovered gold. Bart Dawson explains that he had not returned with the gold immediately following the first gun fight because he suffered from amnesia caused by a gunshot to his head.
