= The Secret of the Caves =

Book by Franklin W. Dixon

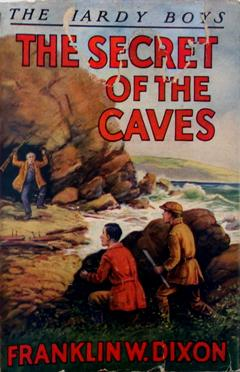
- Original edition
- Author: Franklin W. Dixon
- Language: English
- Series: The Hardy Boys
- Genre: Detective, mystery
- Publisher: Grosset & Dunlap
- Publication date: May 1, 1929 (original edition); 1965 (revised edition)
- Publication place: United States
- Media type: Print (hardback & paperback)
- Pages: 210 (original edition); 175 (revised edition)
- Preceded by: The Shore Road Mystery
- Followed by: The Mystery of Cabin Island
- Text: The Secret of the Caves at Wikisource

The Secret of the Caves is the seventh volume in the original Hardy Boys series of mystery books for children and teens published by Grosset & Dunlap.

This book was written by Leslie McFarlane in 1929 for the Stratemeyer Syndicate, which published it under the pseudonym Franklin W. Dixon. Between 1959 and 1973 the first 38 volumes of this series were systematically revised as part of a project directed by Edward Stratemeyer's daughter Harriet Adams. In 1965, the original version of this book was rewritten by Andrew E. Svenson, resulting in two different stories with the same title.

== Plot summary (revised edition) ==
The book begins with Chet Morton showing off his new metal detector to the Hardy boys and Biff Hooper while inviting them to camp at Honeycomb Caves. Meanwhile, their father, Fenton Hardy, is working to protect a Coastal Radar Station from sabotage during its construction. They are interrupted by Mary Todd who tells them that her brother, Morgan Todd, is missing and asks Fenton to find him. The Hardy boys and their father decide to team up to both find Morgan Todd and protect the Coastal Radar Station.

The Hardy boys travel to Kenworthy College and meet Todd's colleague, Cadmus Quill. A clue leads them to Rockaway, but when it is mentioned they notice strange behavior from Cadmus Quill. While driving to Rockaway they hear a radio report that the radar station has been damaged, so they instead return to Bayport. Their help is not needed so they leave for Rockaway, stopping at Palais Paris to purchase a spinning wheel for their Aunt Gertrude. When they stop in at Tuttle's General Store, Mr. Tuttle warns them to keep away from Honeycomb Caves because people have seen strange lights and heard shooting coming from the caves. Instead of leaving, the boys decide to camp at Honeycomb Caves with their friends Chet and Biff.

At the caves they meet a strange hermit who invites them for breakfast, then chases them off and even shoots at Frank. Their adventure continues with Callie Shaw, Iola Morton and Mary Todd trying to get jobs at the Palais Paris, Biff getting knocked out while waiting in the parking lot, Chet's metal detector suddenly explodes and the Hardy boys' boathouse catching on fire.

The story concludes with the Hardy boys finding a submarine delivering supplies to the hermit in the caves. They explore the cave and learn that the caves have an underground passage to Palais Paris where a device was being built to interfere with the new Coastal Radar Station. The Hardy boys trap the criminals, including Cadmus Quill, in the cave while the State Police enter from the other end and arrest them all. The Navy is alerted and intercepts the submarine to find Morgan Todd being held hostage.

== Additional formats ==
The revised edition was used for an episode of the Hardy Boys animated series, and a View Master version also exists.
