= The Secret Panel =

Book by Franklin W. Dixon

- Original edition
- Author: Franklin W. Dixon
- Language: English
- Series: The Hardy Boys
- Genre: Detective, mystery
- Publisher: Grosset & Dunlap
- Publication date: January 1, 1946
- Publication place: United States
- Media type: Print (hardback & paperback)
- Pages: 192 pp
- Preceded by: The Short-Wave Mystery
- Followed by: The Phantom Freighter

The Secret Panel is the twenty-fifth volume in the original The Hardy Boys series of mystery books for children and teens published by Grosset & Dunlap.

This book was written for the Stratemeyer Syndicate by Harriet S. Adams in 1946. Between 1959 and 1973, the first 38 volumes of this series were systematically revised as part of a project directed by Harriet Adams, Edward Stratemeyer's daughter. The original version of this book was shortened in 1969 by Priscilla Baker-Carr, resulting in two slightly different stories sharing the same title.

== Plot summary ==
Innocently responding to a motorist's request that they shut off a light at his home, the Hardy Boys discover a deep mystery: the man used the name of another man, John Mead, that Chief Collig claims died five years earlier in a car accident, and had no known heir. Adding to the mystery, the Mead mansion's doors have neither knobs nor visible keyholes. Only after speaking to a locksmith do they learn that the locks were concealed.

Meanwhile, their father Fenton assigns them to investigate a lead in the kidnapping of a doctor that may lead down the trail to a local boy who fell in with a local thief, a master criminal, who's a relation to the boy. The Hardy boys are to locate a traffic signal that hums like someone singing faintly, and drive ten minutes from it in each direction, then investigate the area for a "secret panel".

Fenton's mystery ends up intertwining with the Mead mansion and the master criminal, who's been carrying out a series of break-ins and thefts without triggering the alarm systems. It turns out that the deceased Mr. Mead was an electronics genius who developed a device that could open any lock and defeat alarm systems, but asked that, upon his death, it be turned over to the FBI. The master criminal had befriended Mr. Mead, found out about the device, and stolen it. The motorist the boys met was, in fact, John Mead's namesake nephew, who was not known to authorities and investigators in Bayport.
