= The Tower Treasure =

1927 book by Franklin W. Dixon

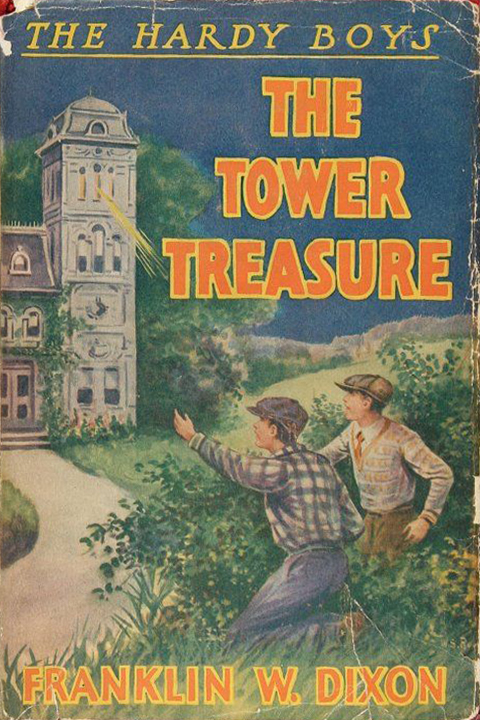
- Original 1927 edition
- Author: Franklin W. Dixon
- Cover artist: Walter S. Rogers
- Language: English
- Series: The Hardy Boys
- Genre: Children's literature/young adult fiction
- Publisher: Grosset & Dunlap
- Publication date: June 1, 1927, revised edition 1959
- Publication place: United States
- Pages: Original edition 216, revised edition 180
- ISBN: 9780448089010
- OCLC: 26152526
- Followed by: The House on the Cliff

The Tower Treasure is the first volume in the original Hardy Boys series published by Grosset & Dunlap. The book ranks 55th on Publishers Weekly's All-Time Bestselling Children's Book List for the United States, with 2,209,774 copies sold as of 2001. This book is one of the "Original 10", generally considered by historians and critics of children's literature to be the best examples of all the Hardy Boys, and Stratemeyer Syndicate, writing.

This book was written for the Stratemeyer Syndicate by Leslie McFarlane and published in 1927. US Copyright expired in 2023, releasing it into the US public domain. However, the 1927 edition is still under copyright in Canada until January 1, 2048 (70 years after Leslie McFarlane’s death, as Canada uses the life of the author plus 70 years for works-for-hire) when it will enter the Canadian Public Domain, along with the rest of McFarlane’s Hardy Boys books. The 1959 version will enter the US Public Domain on January 1, 2055, while it will enter the Canadian Public Domain on January 1, 2053. Between 1959 and 1973 the first 38 volumes were systematically revised as part of a project directed by Harriet S. Adams, Edward Stratemeyer's daughter. While some volumes only had minor changes, the original version of this book had the plot significantly rewritten in 1959 by Adams. In 2024, the original 1927 version was republished by Bauer World Press.

== Plot summary (revision) ==
The story begins with Frank and Joe Hardy barely avoiding being hit by a speeding driver, who they notice has bright red hair. Later, this same red-haired driver attempts a ferry boat ticket office robbery and successfully steals a yellow jalopy called Queen from the Hardys' friend, Chet Morton. Due to one witness reporting that the villain had dark hair, the Hardys assume he is using a red wig. It is learned that the thief returned to Chet's home to steal a tire, helping Frank and Joe to find Queen abandoned in a public wooded area.

The excitement of finding Queen is quickly gone when it is reported that there has been a robbery of forty thousand dollars in securities and jewels from the Tower Mansion owned by siblings Hurd and Adelia Applegate. Hurd Applegate is convinced that the Tower's caretaker, Henry Robinson, is the guilty party. The Hardys are especially concerned by this accusation, because Henry's son, Perry, is a friend of theirs who will have to quit school to work since his father can no longer get a job as a result of Applegate's accusation. The only "proof" of Henry Robinson's guilt is that he was suddenly able to pay off a debt and refused to reveal where he got the money to do so.

The Hardys suspect that the red-haired man may be involved with the Tower robbery and search the place where The Queen was found, finding the red wig. The Hardys' dad, detective Fenton Hardy, learns that the wig was manufactured in New York City. Fenton Hardy goes to New York and learns of a criminal named John "Red" Jackley who is fond of using disguises. Soon, Jackley is injured in a railroad handcar accident, causing him to be hospitalized. About to die, Jackley confesses that he committed the Tower Mansion robbery and put the loot "in the old tower..." Jackley dies before he is able to explain further. Searches of the Applegate's mansion, especially the original "old" Tower, are fruitless.

Frank and Joe decide to go to the railroad where Jackley used to work to find more information. While investigating, they see two water towers nearby; one is new while the other is old and no longer used. Remembering Jackley once worked for the railroad, the boys decide to search the old tower. Inside the old water tower they find the stolen items, but are locked in the tower by a man calling himself Hobo Johnny. Johnny believes that anything in the tower belongs to him. Frank and Joe break out of the water tower and return the missing securities and jewelry, whereupon they receive the $1,000 reward. Following the revelations and with the stolen loot returned, Hurd re-hires Henry with an increase in salary and Hurd builds the greenhouse that Henry has been wanting.

== Appearances (revised edition) ==
=== Characters in the book (The Tower Treasure) ===
- Adelia Applegate
- Hurd Applegate
- Chief Collig
- Fenton Hardy
- Frank Hardy
- Joe Hardy
- Laura Hardy
- John "Red" Jackley
- Hobo Johnny
- Chet Morton
- Iola Morton
- Mr. Morton
- Mrs. Morton
- Henry Robinson
- Mrs. Robinson
- Paula Robinson
- Perry Robinson
- Tessie Robinson
- Callie Shaw
- Oscar Smuff

=== Business and organizations ===
- Bayport & Coast Line Railroad
- Bayport Police Department
- Hamlins Company
- Beer Factory
- Rocco's fruit+vegetables

== Adaptations ==
=== TV adaptation ===
The Tower Treasure became the basis of a serial shown on the Mickey Mouse Club in 1956–1957 as "The Mystery of the Applegate Treasure", named for the descendant of the pirate who was searching for the priceless treasure. This story was also made into a comic from Dell Comics

=== Computer game ===
On September 30, 2008, JoWooD Productions and The Adventure Company released a PC video game based on The Tower Treasure. It is titled The Hardy Boys: The Hidden Theft.

== See also ==
- List of Hardy Boys books
