= The Shore Road Mystery =

Book by Franklin W. Dixon

- Original edition
- Author: Franklin W. Dixon
- Language: English
- Series: The Hardy Boys
- Genre: Detective, mystery
- Publisher: Grosset & Dunlap
- Publication date: September 1, 1928, revised edition 1964
- Publication place: United States
- Pages: original edition 212, revised edition 178
- OCLC: 2531187
- LC Class: PZ7.D644 Sh10
- Preceded by: Hunting for Hidden Gold
- Followed by: The Secret of the Caves
- Text: The Shore Road Mystery at Wikisource

The Shore Road Mystery is the sixth volume in the original The Hardy Boys Mystery Stories published by Grosset & Dunlap. The plot centers on attempts by the Hardy Boys to catch a ring of car thieves stealing cars from the Shore Road.

This book was written for the Stratemeyer Syndicate by Leslie McFarlane in 1928. Between 1959 and 1973 the first 38 volumes of this series were systematically revised as part of a project directed by Harriet Adams, Edward Stratemeyer's daughter. The original version of this book was rewritten in 1964 by David Grambs resulting in two different stories with the same title. The original version entered the public domain in the United States in 2024.

== Plot ==
=== Revised edition ===
The Hardy boys, Frank and Joe, were taking a casual drive down Shore Road when they heard a report about a stolen car. Frank and Joe raced toward the scene and actually saw the stolen car. Suddenly, a big red produce truck came right into the middle of the road. The boys had no choice but to slam on their brakes. They ended up crashing into a fence and were dazed but uninjured. The driver came out of the truck and apologized. Frank remarks that "Something seems fishy about that guy.". They both return home that night trying not to let their mother see their cuts and bruises.

The next morning a friend of the Hardys, Jack Dodd, calls and tells the Hardys to come quickly. The police were looking for a suspect who had stolen a car. The police thought they found their man. They found Jack Dodd's fishing rod in the trunk of one of the stolen cars. Jack insisted that he had not put it there and that he was being framed. The cops handcuffed Jack and his father and took them down to headquarters. Later that night Chief Collig came to the Hardys' home telling them that the Dodds had taken off in their station wagon. A relative of the Dodds is trying to find a solution to an old mystery an ancestor had in the Bayport area.

=== Original edition ===
While riding their motorcycles along the Shore Road the Hardy boys, along with their pal Chet Morton, meet a local fisherman who has just had his car stolen. The three boys give chase, but are delayed due to an accident with a horse-drawn hay wagon. Farther down the road they find their chum, Jack Dodd, and his father being questioned by the police because a stolen car was found in their yard with Jack's fishing rod in the back seat. The Hardy boys resolve to solve the case and clear their friend's name.

While investigating the case the Hardy boys identify suspects including a band of tramps camping on the beach, a man named Gus Montrose who used to work for Mr. Dodd, and a group of fishermen sneaking around the woods at night.

The Hardy boys, with their father Fenton Hardy, the Bayport Police force, State Troopers and a number of other curious people all attempt to investigate/find the car thefts; however, everyone involved is stumped because the cars seem to disappear without a trace and are not spotted leaving either end of the Shore Road area. Because of this the Hardy boys believe that the cars are still in the area, but well hidden, so they devise a plan to trap the car thieves. After purchasing a nice looking roadster the Hardy boys park the car along the Shore Road and hide in the large locker (trunk). During the first night the thieves steal other vehicles but on the next night it is stolen, with the boys in the locker, and driven to the thieves’ secret hideout where the boys are discovered. After some excitement (involving guns), the Hardy boys manage to escape and alert the police who surround the area and arrest all of the thieves (including Gus Montrose), recover the stolen vehicles, and exonerate the Dodds.
