= Nicolas Sarkozy Voodoo Manual =

Satirical book by Yaël Rolognese

- Author: Yaël Rolognese
- Original title: Nicolas Sarkozy le manuel vaudou
- Language: French
- Genre: Biography, Humour, Politics
- Publisher: K&B Editors, Paris
- Publication date: October 8, 2008
- Publication place: France
- Media type: Book-Box
- Pages: 56 pp
- ISBN: 978-2-915957-99-0

The Nicolas Sarkozy Voodoo Manual is a 2008 satirical book by Yaël Rolognese, about the French President Nicolas Sarkozy, published in France by K&B Editors.

== Description ==
The box contains a cloth doll with the president's effigy, a batch of 12 needles, and a book of 56 pages that includes a biography. Similarly, there is another book published for Ségolène Royal in red colour.

== Controversy ==
The book's marketing has been the subject of a complaint by the President of France requesting the withdrawal of the voodoo doll by invoking his right to absolute and exclusive use of his image. The case was taken to court where it was dismissed with the judge invoking freedom of expression, stating that "it is within the limits of freedom of expression and the right to humor" and that "No one can take this process seriously". Nicolas Sarkozy appealed the decision and in November 2008, the court ruled that the doll was actually an offense against the president, ordering K&B to put a label on the package to indicate this to customers. President Sarkozy also won one Euro in damages.

== Publication ==
- Rolognese, Yaël (2008), Nicolas Sarkozy le manuel vaudou (1st ed.), Paris: K&B Editors (published 2008, October 8), ISBN 978-2-915957-99-0

== See also ==
- Voodoo doll
- Hoodoo
- Poppet
