= Mommet =

Mommet may refer to:

- Scarecrow
- Poppet
