= Clay-body =

Scottish magical effigy

A clay-body, clay corpse, or corp criadhach (Scottish Gaelic) is a type of effigy used in Scottish sympathetic magic. They are clay dolls representing a person that a practitioner of magic, or witch, wished to harm. Witches would create such a doll before placing it on a ledge, under a bridge, or in some other place just above the regular height of a flowing river. When the river flooded, the water washed over the doll, slowly dissolving it. It was believed that the target of the magic would become ill and slowly die like the effigy. In some cases, witches inserted pins into the body of the doll to make the death of the target more painful. If one of the effigies was discovered, it was believed that carefully preserving it would break the spell.

== See also ==
- Poppet
- Voodoo doll
