= The Voodoo Plot =

1982 book by Franklin W. Dixon

- Author: Franklin W. Dixon
- Language: English
- Series: Hardy Boys
- Genre: Detective, mystery
- Publisher: Wanderer Books
- Publication date: 1982
- Publication place: United States
- Media type: Print (paperback)
- Pages: 189 pp (first edition paperback)
- ISBN: 0-671-42351-7 (first edition paperback)
- OCLC: 8034810
- LC Class: PZ7.D644 Vo 1982
- Preceded by: Track of the Zombie
- Followed by: The Billion Dollar Ransom

The Voodoo Plot is the 72nd title of the Hardy Boys Mystery Stories, written by Franklin W. Dixon, and published by Wanderer Books in 1982.

== Plot introduction ==
The Hardy Boys and their friend Chet go to see Rattlesnake Clem to investigate a series of robberies. They must find out whether Clem is innocent or is the one who is masquerading as King George III. This was important mainly because of a discordant letter, which threatened to kill a hostage if one were not met with a series of bizarre demands. Although the mayor was the initial recipient of the letter, he thought it logical to allow two young boys to investigate this possibly deadly case instead of authority figures.

== Plot summary ==
The story begins when the Hardy Boys are on a stakeout at an antiques shop. The owner is robbed and blames the Hardy Boys for slacking off. They later find out that a fellow basketball player's grandfather, Stretch Walker, is under a voodoo curse.

The Hardy Boys fly off to see 'Rattlesnake Clem', a man who believes the revolution to still be on, and he believes himself to be the Swamp Fox. He is arrested for the robbery when the stolen goods are found in his garage.

Later, the Hardy Boys find Stretch and help him untangle the mystery of a voodoo cult that wants his bar, Stretch's. The story ends when the antique shop owner turns out to be the thief, going under the guise of King George III, and a mystery developed early in the story is revealed, Fenton's sock was stolen for use on a voodoo doll. When Aunt Gertrude hears this, she remarks how dangerous the business is.

== Characters ==
Iola and Chet Morton, along with Callie Shaw feature as supporting characters in the book.
