= Deadly Chase =

Deadly Chase may refer to:

- The Submarine Caper, a Hardy Boys book, later retitled Deadly Chase
- Deadly Chase (film), a 1978 Italian film
