= Trapped at Sea =

1982 book by Franklin W. Dixon

Trapped At Sea
- Author: Franklin W. Dixon
- Language: English
- Series: Hardy Boys
- Genre: Detective, mystery
- Publisher: Wanderer Books
- Publication date: 1982
- Publication place: United States
- Media type: Print (paperback)
- Pages: 181 pp (first edition paperback)
- ISBN: 0-671-42363-0 (first edition paperback)
- OCLC: 8388315
- LC Class: PZ7.D644 Ts 1982
- Preceded by: Tic-Tac-Terror
- Followed by: Game Plan for Disaster

Trapped at Sea is the 75th title of the Hardy Boys Mystery Stories, written by Franklin W. Dixon. It was published by Wanderer Books in 1982.

== Plot summary ==
This book opens with Frank, Joe & Chet being involved in a traffic accident with a Mack truck. As the car is damaged, the drivers of the Mack truck offer the boys a lift to the next town. Unfortunately the truck gets hijacked by a gang and the drivers locked up in the trailer. Later Mr. Hardy tells the boys that there have been a number of hijackings against that firm, the Ortiz Trucking Company, and that he's going to Washington the following day to help the FBI investigate the hijackings.

Initially, Frank, Joe and Chet work undercover as drivers at the Ortiz Trucking Company before Joe finds himself hijacked by one of the gang. Tracking the gang down, Frank, Joe & Chet stow away on a ship named the Mary Malone and find themselves facing the gang, a group of corrupt officials who plan to use nuclear weapons on every major city on Earth to take over the world.
