= The Billion Dollar Ransom =

1982 book by Franklin W. Dixon

- Author: Franklin W. Dixon
- Language: English
- Series: Hardy Boys
- Genre: Detective, mystery
- Publisher: Wanderer Books
- Publication date: 1982
- Publication place: United States
- Media type: Print (paperback)
- Pages: 189 pp (first edition paperback)
- ISBN: 0-671-42355-X (first edition paperback)
- OCLC: 7925033
- LC Class: PZ7.D644 Bi 1982
- Preceded by: The Voodoo Plot
- Followed by: Tic-Tac-Terror

The Billion Dollar Ransom is the 73rd title of the Hardy Boys series of mystery books for children and teens, published under the pseudonym Franklin W. Dixon. It was published by Wanderer Books in 1982.

== Plot summary ==
The Hardy boys help out when a magicians' tournament is threatened by mysterious happenings. Frank and Joe naturally catch the magician who kidnapped the President and all culprits by slowly closing in on their position and taking control.
