= Game Plan for Disaster =

1982 book by Franklin W. Dixon

- Author: Franklin W. Dixon
- Language: English
- Series: Hardy Boys
- Genre: Detective, mystery
- Publisher: Wanderer Books
- Publication date: 1982
- Publication place: United States
- Media type: Print (paperback)
- Pages: 206 pp (first edition paperback)
- ISBN: 0-671-42365-7 (first edition paperback)
- OCLC: 8532342
- LC Class: PZ7.D644 Gam 1982
- Preceded by: Trapped At Sea
- Followed by: The Crimson Flame

Game Plan for Disaster is the 76th title of the Hardy Boys Mystery Stories, written by Franklin W. Dixon. It was published by Wanderer Books in 1982.

== Plot summary ==
Frank and Joe Hardy are drawn into a tangled web of danger when they are called in to investigate mysterious accidents plaguing a star college football quarterback.
