= The Mummy Case (Hardy Boys) =

1980 book by Franklin W. Dixon

The Mummy case
- Author: Franklin W. Dixon
- Language: English
- Series: Hardy Boys
- Genre: Detective, mystery
- Publisher: Wanderer Books, Grosset & Dunlap
- Publication date: 1980
- Publication place: United States
- Media type: Print (paperback)
- Pages: 180 pp (first edition paperback)
- ISBN: 0-671-41111-X (first edition paperback)
- OCLC: 6200125
- LC Class: PZ7.D644 Ms
- Preceded by: The Apeman's Secret
- Followed by: Mystery of Smugglers Cove

The Mummy Case is the 63rd title of the Hardy Boys Mystery Stories, written by Franklin W. Dixon. It was published by Wanderer Books in 1980 and by Grosset & Dunlap in 2005.

== Plot summary ==
When five Egyptian statuettes are stolen from a museum, the Hardy Boys travel to Egypt. En route, the boys are asked to safeguard a mysterious mummy and find themselves tangled in a web of international intrigue. On the Nile, the young detectives uncover a secret hiding place with countless stolen treasures.
