= The Apeman's Secret =

1980 book by Franklin W. Dixon

- Author: Franklin W. Dixon
- Language: English
- Series: Hardy Boys
- Genre: Detective, mystery
- Publisher: Wanderer Books, Grosset & Dunlap
- Publication date: 1980
- Publication place: United States
- Media type: Print (paperback)
- Pages: 184 p. (first edition paperback)
- ISBN: 0-671-95482-2 (first edition paperback)
- OCLC: 5750768
- LC Class: PZ7.D644 Ap
- Preceded by: The Pentagon Spy
- Followed by: The Mummy Case

The Apeman's Secret is the 62nd title of the Hardy Boys Mystery Stories, written by Franklin W. Dixon. Grosset & Dunlap published the book in 2005. It was first published in 1980.

== Plot summary ==
The Hardy Boys investigate the disappearance of an eighteen-year-old girl suspected of joining a sinister religious cult. A few days later the boys get an offbeat assignment from a comic book publisher: The real life double of his character, Apeman, is turning up everywhere and causing considerable damage. Frank and Joe tackle both cases and uncover an intricate scheme by a clever gang of crooks.
