= Mystery of Smugglers Cove =

1980 book by Franklin W. Dixon

The Mystery of Smugglers Cove
- Author: Franklin W. Dixon
- Language: English
- Series: Hardy Boys
- Genre: Detective, mystery
- Publisher: Wanderer Books, Grosset & Dunlap
- Publication date: 1980
- Publication place: United States
- Media type: Print (paperback)
- Pages: 181 pp (first edition paperback)
- ISBN: 0-671-41112-8 (first edition paperback)
- OCLC: 6356628
- LC Class: PZ7.D644 Myar
- Preceded by: The Mummy Case
- Followed by: The Stone Idol

The Mystery of Smugglers Cove is the 64th title of the Hardy Boys series of detective/mystery books written by Franklin W. Dixon. It was published by Wanderer Books in 1980 and by Grosset & Dunlap in 2005.

== Plot summary ==
A painting is stolen, and the Hardy Boys are suspects. Determined to find the artwork, the young detectives fly to Florida, where they disguise themselves and join a group of sinister smugglers. Though the painting fails to appear, an important clue sends the boys on a perilous trek through the Everglades. Threatened at every turn by greedy enemies, the Hardys fight a tricky and powerful battle to expose the truth.

== References in pop culture ==
In "The Wizard of Evergreen Terrace", an episode of The Simpsons, Homer tells Bart that not all Hardy Boys books are about smugglers, and said for example that, "The Smugglers of Pirates Cove is about pirates!" While this is not the title of an actual Hardy Boys book, the title very closely resembles that of this book.

== See also ==
- List of Hardy Boys books
