= Track of the Zombie =

1982 book by Franklin W. Dixon

- Author: Franklin W. Dixon
- Language: English
- Series: Hardy Boys
- Genre: Detective, mystery
- Publisher: Wanderer Books
- Publication date: 1982
- Publication place: United States
- Media type: Print (paperback)
- Pages: 185 pp (first edition paperback)
- ISBN: 0-671-42349-5 (first edition paperback)
- OCLC: 7925054
- LC Class: PZ7.D644 Tr 1982
- Preceded by: The Infinity Clue
- Followed by: The Voodoo Plot

Track of the Zombie is the 71st title of the Hardy Boys series of mystery books for children and teens, written by Franklin W. Dixon. It was published by Wanderer Books in 1982.

== Plot summary ==
The story begins with the Hardy Boys rescuing a boy from a road hog who looks suspiciously like a zombie wearing a Hessian uniform. The boy turns out to be Rolf Allen, who wants the Hardys to investigate a string of forest fires in Vermont, and the number one suspect is the zombie in the Hessian uniform. Shortly later, the Hardys are approached by a circus owner named Tariski, who needs their help in finding out the culprit who is sabotaging his circus. The Hardys accept both cases. They are met with Lonnie Mindo, a friend of Rolf's who is in the play Julius Caesar and playing Caesar himself. The Hardys find a crypt with a coffin of the Hessian soldiers and find the zombie has been there. Suddenly, in a bizarre forest fire, the Hardys spot the zombie and give chase, but are held back. They volunteer on playing guitar for a concert held by a chap named Pollard. Very soon, they find he is in league with the party. They nearly get caught investigating, and escape by a hair's breadth. Some days later, the Hardys go for a circus hosted by Tariski himself. Things, however, go wrong when Biff Hooper, the Hardys' pal, manages to rattle the audience with a particularly dangerous act. However, Joe Hardy saves the show and makes the audience stay. Tariski was immensely thankful to him. As though that weren't enough, someone let a circus lion out, but Chet Morton, another chum of the Hardy brothers, manages to save the day by taming the lion with a chair. Soon after, the gang is rounded up, with the zombie turning out to be Lonnie Mindo, and Pollard and Tariski being into the gang. Very soon, they were arrested too, thus putting the string of forest fires in Vermont to an end.
