= The Vanishing Thieves =

1981 book by Franklin W. Dixon

- First edition
- Author: Franklin W. Dixon
- Language: English
- Series: Hardy Boys
- Genre: Detective, mystery
- Publisher: Wanderer Books, Grosset & Dunlap
- Publication date: 1981
- Publication place: United States
- Media type: Print (paperback)
- Pages: 179 pp (first edition paperback)
- ISBN: 0-671-42292-8 (first edition paperback)
- OCLC: 6916354
- LC Class: PZ7.D644 Van
- Preceded by: The Stone Idol
- Followed by: The Outlaw's Silver

The Vanishing Thieves is the 66th title of the Hardy Boys Mystery Stories, written by Franklin W. Dixon. Wanderer Books published this book in 1981 and Grosset & Dunlap published this book in 2005. As of 2018, this is the last Hardy Boys story to be published by Grosset & Dunlap.

== Plot summary ==
Chet Morton's cousin, Vern, is on his way to California to find a rare and valuable coin mysteriously missing from his uncle's bank vault. When he stops in Bayport, his brand-new car is stolen. The Hardys take on a double mystery – and double danger – as they head for the West Coast to investigate this sinister mystery.

== Notes ==
Grosset & Dunlap only had the license for volumes 59-66 from 2005 to 2013.
