= Tic-Tac-Terror =

1982 book by Franklin W. Dixon

- Author: Franklin W. Dixon
- Language: English
- Series: Hardy Boys
- Genre: Detective, mystery
- Publisher: Wanderer Books
- Publication date: 1982
- Publication place: United States
- Media type: Print (paperback)
- Pages: 201 pp (first edition paperback)
- ISBN: 0-671-42357-6 (first edition paperback)
- OCLC: 7975365
- LC Class: PZ7.D644 Ti 1982
- Preceded by: The Billion Dollar Ransom
- Followed by: Trapped at Sea

Tic-Tac-Terror is the 74th title of the Hardy Boys Mystery Stories, written by Franklin W. Dixon. It was published by Wanderer Books in 1982.

== Plot ==
In this book the Frank and Joe Hardy are asked to investigate a mystery involving a world-famous spy from HAVOC, an international network of terrorists, who wants to defect to the U.S. Frank and Joe know the spy as "Igor”.

Also a million-dollar emerald from South America has vanished. Joe and Frank think “Igor” was involved. Their only clue is mysterious symbol in shape of tic-tac-toe. The game lead to a building that is run by the U.S. government. The building has a bomb and the Hardys are trapped in a deadly game of tic-tac-toe.
