= The Stone Idol =

1981 book by Franklin W. Dixon

- Author: Franklin W. Dixon
- Language: English
- Series: Hardy Boys
- Genre: Detective, mystery
- Publisher: Wanderer Books, Grosset & Dunlap
- Publication date: 1981
- Publication place: United States
- Media type: Print (paperback)
- Pages: 177 pp (first edition paperback)
- ISBN: 0-671-42290-1 (first edition paperback)
- OCLC: 6735361
- LC Class: PZ7.D644 Su
- Preceded by: Mystery of Smugglers Cove
- Followed by: The Vanishing Thieves

The Stone Idol is the 65th title of the Hardy Boys Mystery Stories, written by Franklin W. Dixon. Wanderer Books published the book in 1981 and Grosset & Dunlap published the book in 2005. The novel is a treasure hunting action-adventure story typical of this period in children's literature in the United States. The genre was popular in the late 1970s and 1980s in part due to the popularity of the Indiana Jones franchise.

== Plot summary ==
When an ancient stone idol mysteriously disappears, the Hardy Boys embark on another thrilling adventure. Their investigation takes them from a remote village in the Andes Mountains to Antarctica and, ultimately, Easter Island. Drawing on their keen observational and investigative skills, the boys uncover unexpected truths, revealing that the mystery surrounding the missing idol is far more complex than it initially appears.
