= The Four-Headed Dragon =

1981 book by Franklin W. Dixon

- Author: Franklin W. Dixon
- Language: English
- Series: Hardy Boys
- Genre: Detective, mystery
- Publisher: Wanderer Books
- Publication date: 1981
- Publication place: United States
- Media type: Print (paperback)
- Pages: 180 pp (first edition paperback)
- ISBN: 0-671-42341-X (first edition paperback)
- OCLC: 7572618
- LC Class: PZ7.D644 Fu
- Preceded by: Submarine Caper (later retitled Deadly Chase)
- Followed by: The Infinity Clue

The Four-Headed Dragon is the 69th title of the Hardy Boys Mystery Stories, written by Franklin W. Dixon. It was published by Wanderer Books in 1981.

== Plot summary ==
The Hardy boys track a criminal who plans to use an invention designed as a peaceful aid to the secret Four-Headed Dragon organization behind the Iron Curtain to harm the free world instead.
