= The Infinity Clue =

1981 book by Franklin W. Dixon

- Author: Franklin W. Dixon
- Language: English
- Series: Hardy Boys
- Genre: Detective, mystery
- Publisher: Wanderer Books
- Publication date: 1981
- Publication place: United States
- Media type: Print (paperback)
- Pages: 190 pp (first edition paperback)
- ISBN: 0-671-42342-8 (first edition paperback)
- OCLC: 7572222
- LC Class: PZ7.D644 In
- Preceded by: The Four-headed Dragon
- Followed by: Track of the Zombie

The Infinity Clue is the 70th title in the Hardy Boys series of mystery books for children and teens, published under the pseudonym Franklin W. Dixon. It was published by Wanderer Books in 1981.

== Plot summary ==
After a dangerous tour of a nuclear power plant which was struck by an earthquake, Frank, Joe, and Chet travel to Washington, DC. This is after they receive a strange, cryptic letter from their father commanding them to go there and to be aware of Infinity. After they arrive in Washington, DC, they are threatened by a ruthless terrorist who seems to have a hobby with explosives. The Infinity clue seems to turn up everywhere and a supposedly cursed diamond is stolen. The Hardy Boys are suspect of stealing the diamond and take on this new case to try to clear their name. After failure after failure, the Hardy Boys go to a strange drilling site and find the Infinity clue there too. While staying at camp, they witness a boat disguised as carrying oysters passing by. The Hardy Boys witness strange flashes and go to the source to investigate. They find a strange island where the people seem to be living in the 18th century. They then find a supposedly dead man who is the owner of the stolen diamond. Later, they travel to a strange chain of islands and learn of a sinister plot to sabotage nuclear power plants with artificial earthquakes created by miniature nuclear bombs to harm the nuclear power industry and to make oil more popular.
