= The Crimson Flame =

1983 book by Franklin W. Dixon

- Author: Franklin W. Dixon
- Language: English
- Series: Hardy Boys
- Genre: Detective, mystery
- Publisher: Wanderer Books
- Publication date: 1983
- Publication place: United States
- Media type: Print (paperback)
- Pages: 206 pp (first edition paperback)
- ISBN: 0-671-42367-3 (first edition paperback)
- OCLC: 8866688
- LC Class: PZ7.D644 Cq 1983
- Preceded by: Game Plan for Disaster
- Followed by: Cave-In (Hardy Boys)

The Crimson Flame is the 77th title in the Hardy Boys series of mystery books for children and teens, published under the pseudonym Franklin W. Dixon. It was published by Wanderer Books in 1983.

== Plot summary ==
The plot begins with Frank and Joe witnessing a westerner being attacked by a notorious jewel thief Oscar Tamm. The westerner reveals himself as Alfred McVay and as an avid jewel collector. Due to suspicious happenings at his ranch house in Arizona, he hires the Hardys for protection.

Upon reaching there the Hardys start to investigate the strange happenings and develop an immediate dislike of the foreman, Wat Perkins. They are also intrigued by a "mysterious rider" who seems to be sending messages to someone in the ranch house. They also grow suspicious of the butler Wilbur.

When a tornado strikes the ranch, the Crimson Flame, a priceless ruby gets stolen. McVay becomes morose and the Hardys, with a couple of clues, pursue the jewel thieves to Thailand. The rest of the plot follows how the boys help capture the crooks and eventually, how the lost ruby is found.

== Notes ==
In Chapter 1, it is revealed that Frank and Joe have their full detective credentials, and are professional detectives.
