= The Pentagon Spy =

1980 book by Franklin W. Dixon

- Author: Franklin W. Dixon
- Language: English
- Series: Hardy Boys
- Genre: Detective, mystery
- Publisher: Wanderer Books, Grosset & Dunlap
- Publication date: 1980
- Publication place: United States
- Media type: Print (paperback)
- Pages: 182 pp (first edition paperback)
- ISBN: 0-448-43698-1 (first edition paperback)
- OCLC: 60362036
- Preceded by: Mystery of the Samurai Sword
- Followed by: The Apeman's Secret

The Pentagon Spy by Franklin W. Dixon is the 61st title of the Hardy Boys Mystery Stories. It was published by Wanderer Books in 1980 and by Grosset & Dunlap in 2005.

== Plot summary ==
Valuable antique weather vanes are being stolen in the Pennsylvania Dutch Country. A Navy employee removes a top secret document from the Pentagon and then goes missing. Fenton Hardy, Frank and Joe's father, is assigned to find the man and the document. The Hardy brothers discover the connection between the two seemingly unrelated cases.
