= The Outlaw's Silver =

1981 book by Franklin W. Dixon

- First edition
- Author: Franklin W. Dixon
- Language: English
- Series: Hardy Boys
- Genre: Detective, mystery
- Publisher: Wanderer Books
- Publication date: 1981
- Publication place: United States
- Media type: Print (paperback)
- Pages: 190 pp (first edition paperback)
- ISBN: 0-671-42337-1 (first edition paperback)
- OCLC: 7615367
- LC Class: PZ7.D644 Os
- Preceded by: The Vanishing Thieves
- Followed by: Submarine Caper (retitled Deadly Chase)

The Outlaw's Silver is the 67th title in the Hardy Boys series of mystery books for children and teens, published under the pseudonym Franklin W. Dixon. It was published by Wanderer Books in 1981.

== Plot summary ==
Frank and Joe Hardy receive a special delivery package containing a photo copy of a 200 year old letter supposedly written by the “Outlaw of the Pine Barrens” telling about a lost treasure of silver hidden in the New Jersey Pine Barrens. This letter arrived at the same time they received a phone call from someone identifying himself as the Outlaw warning them to stay away from the Pine Barrens and forget any ideas of searching for the silver. They determine that the real Outlaw of the Pine Barrens has been dead for two centuries. The Hardys can't pass up this great opportunity for both adventure and mystery and get their gang together of Chet, Biff, and Tony, and head off for a camping trip to New Jersey. In the woods, they soon encounter a criminal gang of smugglers, combined with the “ghost” of the outlaw, and the New Jersey Devil himself, all attempting to thwart their mission. Following a one word clue of “fishhook”, the boys have their father's pilot, Jack Wayne, fly them over the pine barrens in their family plane, the Skyhappy Sal, so they may parachute into the wilderness. This adventure enables them to follow the final clues in order to solve the mystery.
