= Corn husk doll =

Native American doll

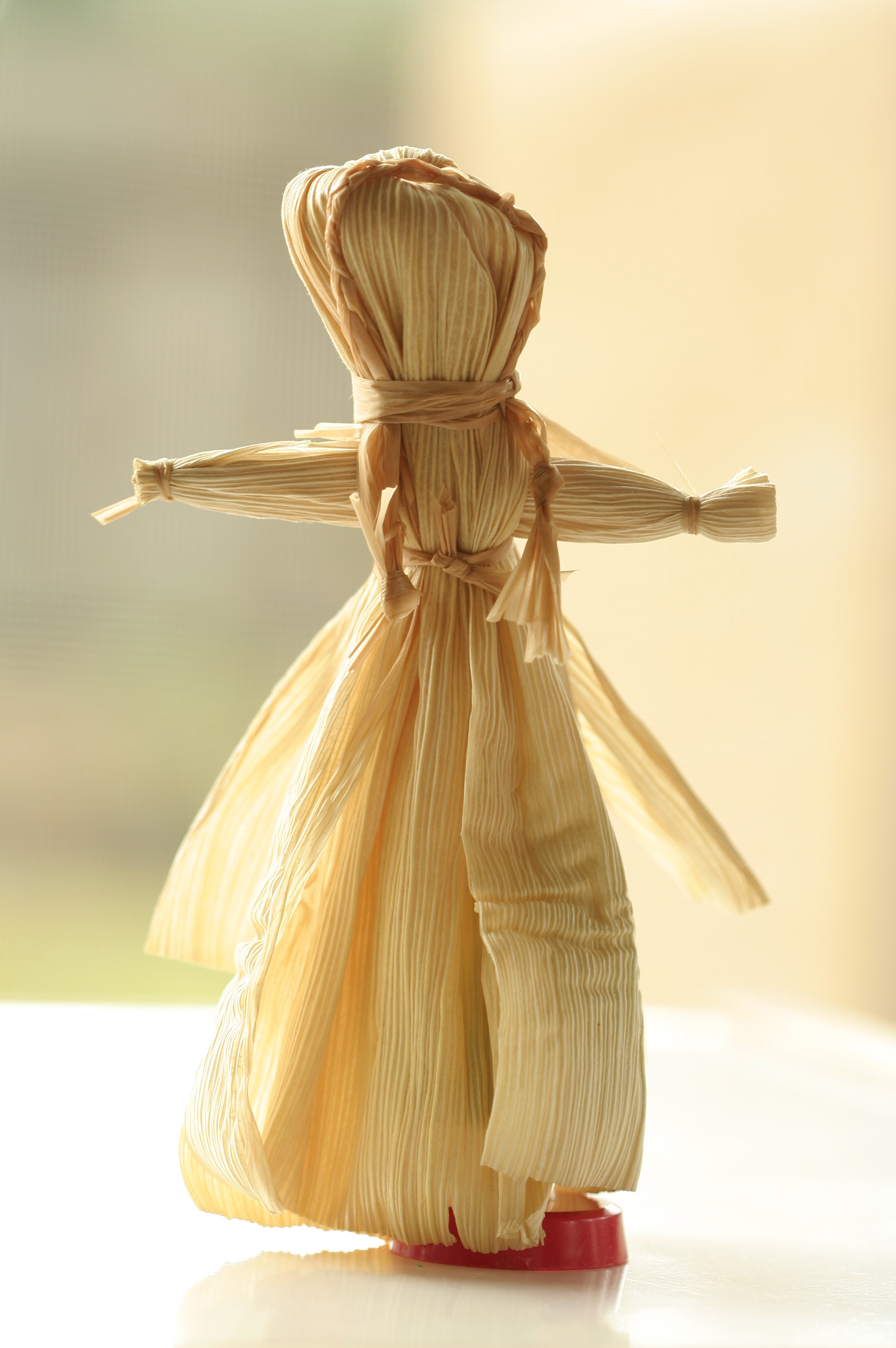
A corn husk doll made in traditional design

A corn husk doll is a Native American doll made out of the dried leaves or "husk" of a corn cob. Maize, known in some countries as corn, is a large grain plant domesticated by indigenous peoples in Mesoamerica in prehistoric times. Every part of the ear of corn was used. Women braided the husks for rope and twine and coiled them into containers and mats. Shredded husks made good kindling and filling for pillows and mattresses. The corncobs served as bottle stoppers, scrubbing brushes, and fuel for smoking meat. Corn silk made hair for corn husk dolls. Corn husk dolls have been made by Northeastern Native Americans probably since the beginnings of corn agriculture more than a thousand years ago. Brittle dried cornhusks become soft if soaked in water and produce finished dolls sturdy enough for children's toys. Making corn husk dolls was adopted by early European settlers in the United States of America. Corn husk doll making is now practiced in the United States as a link to Native American culture and the arts and crafts of the settlers. In other cultures, (specifically Western) corn dollies are used to celebrate Lammas. Corn dollies are magical charms thought to protect the home, livestock, and personal wellness of the maker and their family. They may be a home for the spirit of the crop. The tradition pertains to the idea that the crop of grain has a spirit that loses its home after the final harvest and it is therefore to be invited and housed in the home over the winter before being returned to the earth in spring for the next crop.

Corn husk dolls do not have faces, and there are a number of traditional explanations for this. One legend is that the Spirit of Corn, one of the Three Sisters, made a doll out of her husks to entertain children. The doll had a beautiful face, and began to spend less time with children and more time contemplating her own loveliness. As a result of her vanity, the doll's face was taken away.

== Legend ==
One of the more common legends states that the Spirit of Corn asked the Great Spirit for the ability to unite the Iroquois tribe. The Spirit of Corn was allowed to create the corn husk doll and was made to have a beautiful face. However, when the doll found out about her beauty, she began to ignore the Iroquois people, making them upset. After the doll ignored the Great Spirit's warning, a messenger was sent to tell the doll that her punishment would be to live without a face and be unable to talk to other people until she could get her face back.

Another variation of the legend has the Spirit of Corn ask Creator for the ability to entertain children while their parents worked. After Creator sends an owl down three times to give the doll a warning after she ignored the children, the owl was sent to snatch the doll's reflection from the water, along with her face.

== Making of the doll ==
After moistening the cornhusks in water, two are held together by the ends. Another cornhusk is wrapped around the ends to hold the two husks together, making a big lump. The extra husks are folded over the lump and tied with a piece of yarn, creating the head of the doll. A separate cornhusk is separated into three parts, tied together at one end with yarn. The strips are then braided, and the other end is tied, creating hands and arms. The arms are positioned between the first two husks and under the head. Another separate husk is split into two and each strip is folded over each of the doll's shoulders. The extra husks are tied around the waist of the doll, creating a shirt.

The exact making of the doll varies from the person who made it as some create pants or fingers. Europeans and African children played with corn husk dolls, as the dolls are extremely cheap to make. This also allowed the dolls to be created by the poor and enslaved. In the late 2010s, the Southern Highlands of North Carolina had people create the dolls for artistic purposes rather than for children to play with. Some corn shuck artists have patented their style of making the dolls.

== See also ==
- Corn dolly
