= Gathering Day =

Welsh festival of the summer solstice

Gathering Day is a Welsh festival of the summer solstice, so called because it was the time when druids gathered mistletoe and other plants for use in winter. The energy of plants harvested at Midsummer was believed to be very potent, hence herbs were collected then for medicinal use; these herbs included mugwort and vervain.

This festival marks the first of the three harvests of the year and the time for collecting young tender vegetables such as peas, beans and early fruits. It is also the time for the collection of honey.

== Historical mentions ==
In August 1402, the Gathering Day festival had to be postponed until September when Henry IV faced a threat of invasion of the North from the Duke of Albany and the Earl of Douglas with a large army of Scots.

It is believed that until 1917 the town of Killorglin in County Kerry followed the tradition of the puck or he-goat which was collected by the youth of the town, crowned as king, put on display for three days and then paraded in the town. The goat's reputation as a randy creature may hint at the licentious behaviour common during this festival. Although believed by locals to be a very ancient festival, experts believe that it cannot be more than 300 years old due to the usage of the term puck and the goat's lack of symbolic significance in Celtic culture.

== See also ==
- Calan Awst
- Harvest festival
- Puck Fair
