= The Submarine Caper =

1981 book by Franklin W. Dixon

The Submarine Caper (Deadly Chase)
- Author: Franklin W. Dixon
- Language: English
- Series: Hardy Boys
- Genre: Detective, mystery
- Publisher: Wanderer Books
- Publication date: 1981
- Publication place: United States
- Media type: Print (paperback)
- Pages: 187 pp (first edition paperback)
- ISBN: 0-671-42339-8 (first edition paperback)
- OCLC: 7459820
- LC Class: PZ7.D644 Sv
- Preceded by: The Outlaw's Silver
- Followed by: The Four-headed Dragon

The Submarine Caper (later retitled Deadly Chase) is the 68th title of the Hardy Boys series of detective/mystery books written by Franklin W. Dixon. It was published by Wanderer Books in 1981.

== Plot summary ==
On a visit to Germany the Hardy brothers investigate the theft of plans for a newly invented submarine and the mysterious disappearance of valuable coins and paintings.

== See also ==
List of Hardy Boys books
