= Voodoo doll =

Effigy into which pins are inserted

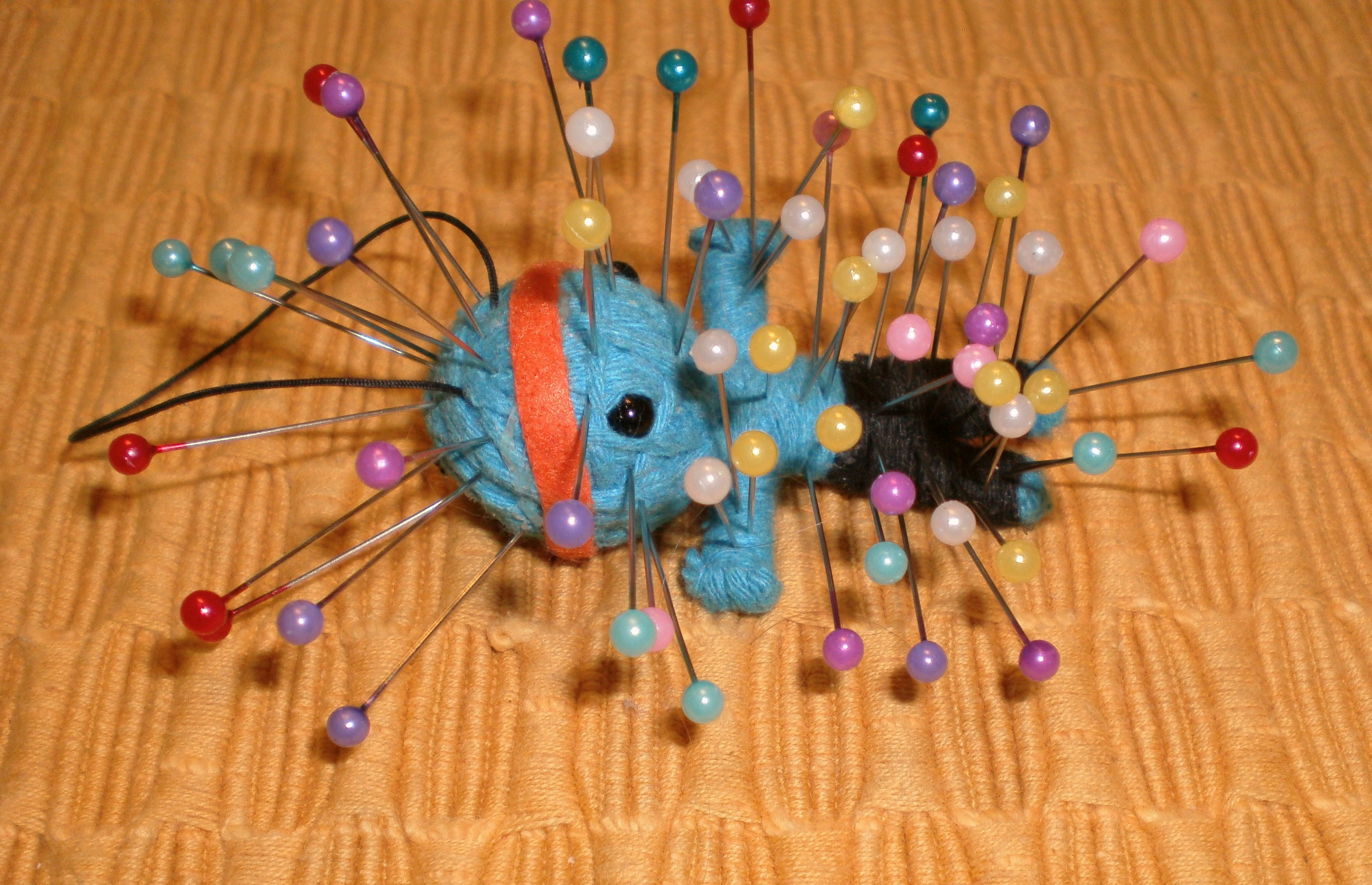
A contemporary voodoo doll, with 58 pins

A voodoo doll is an effigy that is typically used for the insertion of pins. Such practices are found in various forms in the magical traditions of many cultures around the world.

Despite its name, the voodoo doll is not prominent in the African diaspora religions of Haitian Vodou nor Louisiana Voodoo.

== Depictions in culture ==
=== 20th-century link with Voodoo ===
The association of the voodoo doll and the religion of Voodoo was established through the presentation of the latter in Western popular culture during the first half of the 20th century as part of the broader negative depictions of Black and Afro-Caribbean religious practices in the United States. In John Houston Craige's 1933 book Black Bagdad: The Arabian Nights Adventures of a Marine Captain in Haiti, a Haitian prisoner is described sticking pins into an effigy to induce illness. In film, representations of Haitian Vodou in works such as Victor Halperin's 1932 White Zombie and Jacques Tourneur’s 1943 I Walked with a Zombie also involves the use of the dolls. Voodoo dolls are also featured in one episode of The Woody Woodpecker Show (1961), as well as in the British musical Lisztomania (1975) and the films Creepshow (1982), Indiana Jones and the Temple of Doom (1984), The Witches of Eastwick (1987), Child's Play (1988) and Scooby-Doo on Zombie Island (1998).

By the early 21st century, the image of the voodoo doll had become particularly pervasive. It had become a novelty item available for purchase, with examples being provided in vending machines in British shopping centres, and an article on "How to Make a Voodoo Doll" being included on WikiHow. Voodoo dolls were also featured in the 2009 animated Disney film The Princess and the Frog, as well as the 2011 live-action Disney movie Pirates of the Caribbean: On Stranger Tides.

== See also ==
- Clay-body
- Haitian Vodou
- Haunted doll
- Hopi Kachina figure
- Nkondi
- Poppet
- Shikigami
- Totem
- Ushabti
- Ushi no toki mairi
