= Poppet =

Doll used in folk magic and witchcraft

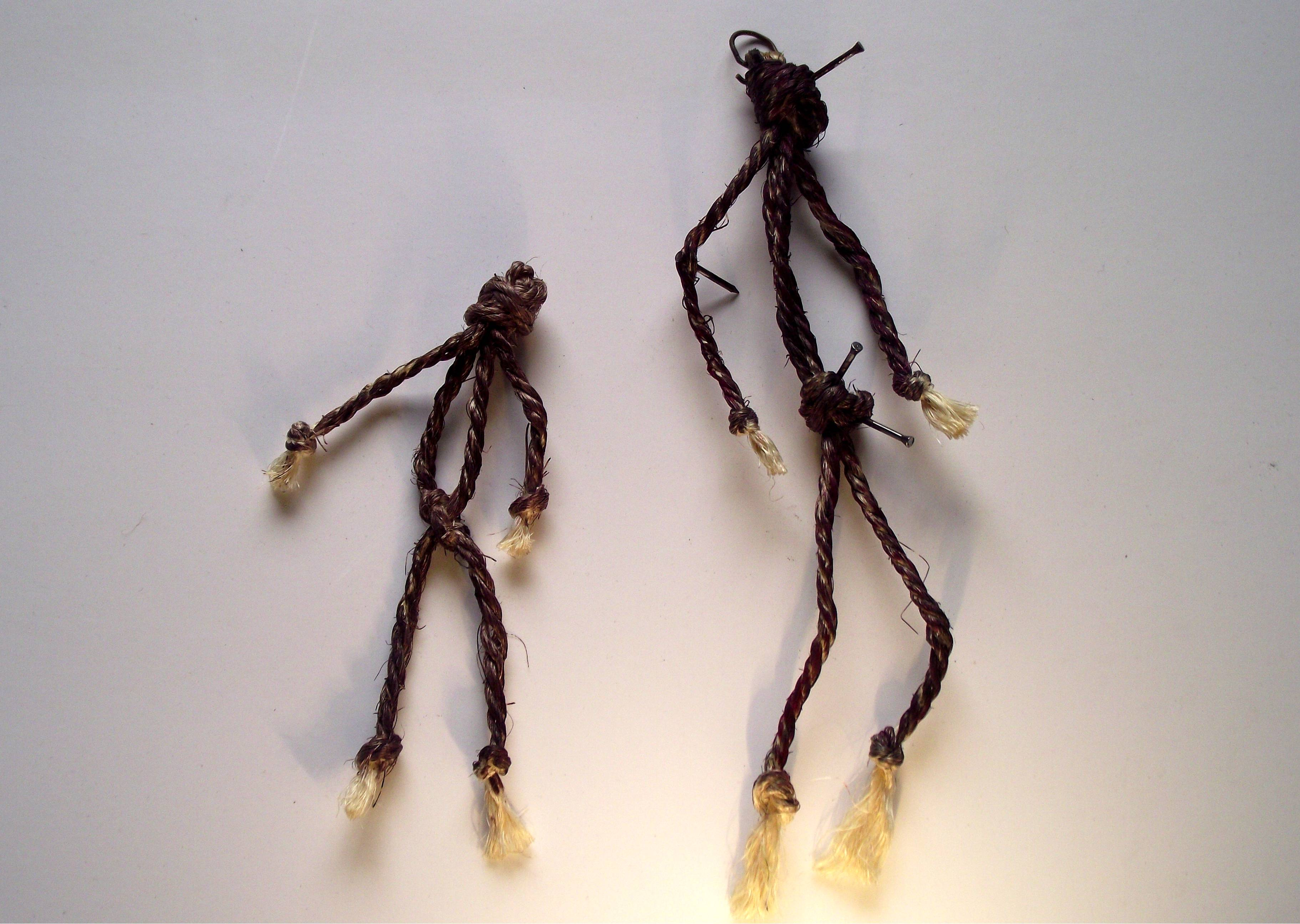
Poppets

In folk magic and witchcraft, a poppet (also known as poppit, moppet, mommet or pippy) is a doll made to represent a person, for casting spells on them, or aiding that person through magic. They are occasionally found lodged in chimneys. These dolls may be fashioned from materials such as carved root, grain, corn shafts, fruit, paper, wax, a potato, clay, branches, or cloth stuffed with herbs, with the intent that any actions performed upon the effigy will be transferred to the subject based on sympathetic magic. Poppets are also used as kitchen witch figures.

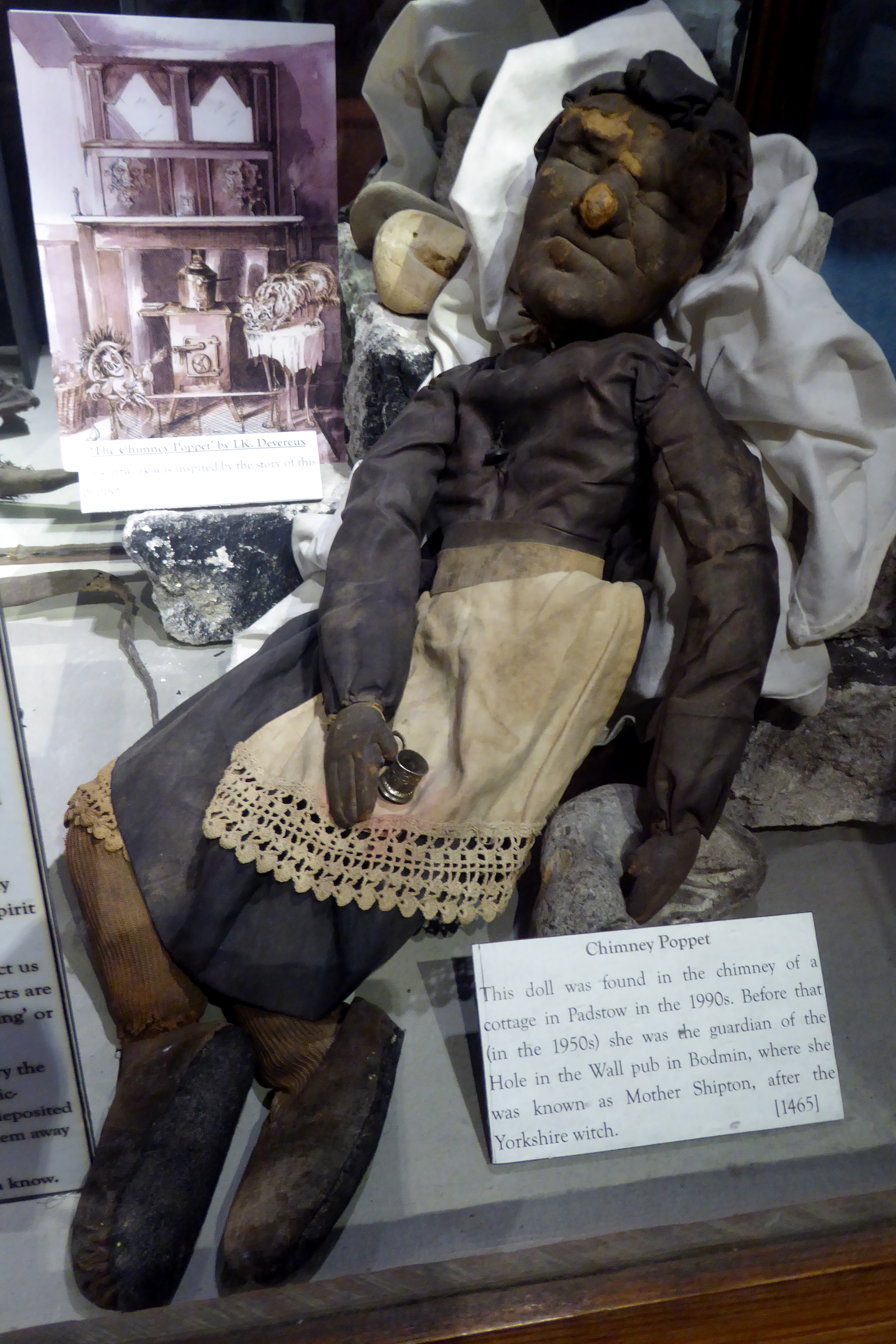
Poppet found in a chimney in Padstow, Cornwall

== Etymology ==
The word poppet is a variant of puppet, from Middle English popet, meaning a small child or a doll. In British English it continues to hold this meaning. Poppet is also a chiefly British term of endearment or diminutive referring to a young child, much like the words "dear" or "sweetie."

== Purpose ==
Poppets are commonly believed, in folk magic, to serve as spirit bridges. A poppet can be designed for benevolent purposes, such as the wishing of good health or opportunities on the recipient, or for more malicious intents, such as bringing harm onto the person they represent.

== Poppets throughout the world ==
Throughout the world, each culture has their own version of a poppet. Poppet doll materials vary across cultures, and, most importantly, the motive or intentions for the poppet.

== Types of poppets ==
=== German kitchen witch ===
The origin of the German kitchen witch poppet is debated by many. One suggested location for the kitchen poppet's origin is Scandinavia, although the first mentions of it in writing come from England.

The kitchen witch poppet is intended to bring good energy into the home kitchen, and prevent kitchen disasters. Many of these common kitchen errors can include lowering the risk of food coming out bad such as having the meal burnt, or undercooked. In order for these intentions to be upheld, it is believed that a prayer or a ritual will be needed, due to the idea of the kitchen being one of the most important places in the household, as the source of remedies or basic nutrition to maintain the body.

=== Love poppet ===
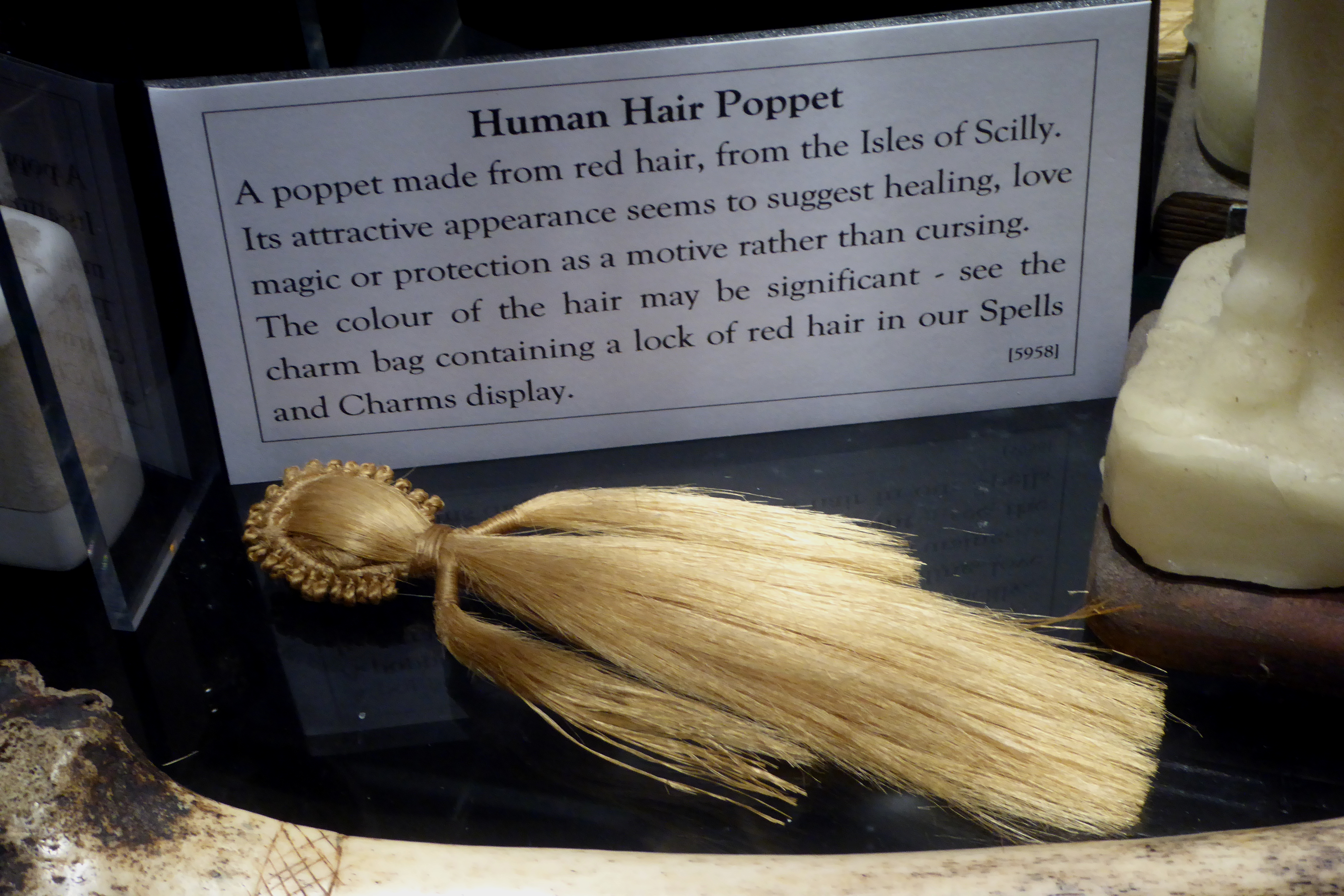
Poppet made from human hair, Isles of Scilly; possibly a love poppet

A love poppet may be used for the healing of oneself, for displaying affection to loved ones, or to foster relationships or couples. Objects that are put inside the poppet could be rose quartz, petals of the recipient's favourite flowers. Small belongings of the intended person, placed within the poppet, can also serve as a way to make it more connected to the intent.

=== Prosperity poppet ===
The prosperity poppet could be used in hoping for a good outcome in one's life through school, work, physical status, or financial status.

=== Healing poppet ===
Healing poppets may be intended to grant good health mentally, physically and emotionally. In this poppet it is common to include objects traditionally associated with healing, such as rose quartz, rose petals, and sage to cleanse the body and mind.

=== Protection poppet ===
These poppets are designed for spiritual protection of a person's family and loved ones, and the removal of supposed curses or bad luck. These poppets may be designed to physically resemble their intended person. They may also include items such as hematite and amethyst, in addition to basil, patchouli, and coffee.

== See also ==
- Comfort object and transitional object
- Corn dolly
- Corn husk doll
- Hoko doll
- Motanka doll
- Effigy
- Voodoo doll
- Kachina doll
- Hopi Kachina figure
- Witch bottle
- Mexican rag doll
- Folk religion
- Ushi no toki mairi
