= Xbox Live Vision =

Webcam accessory for the Xbox 360

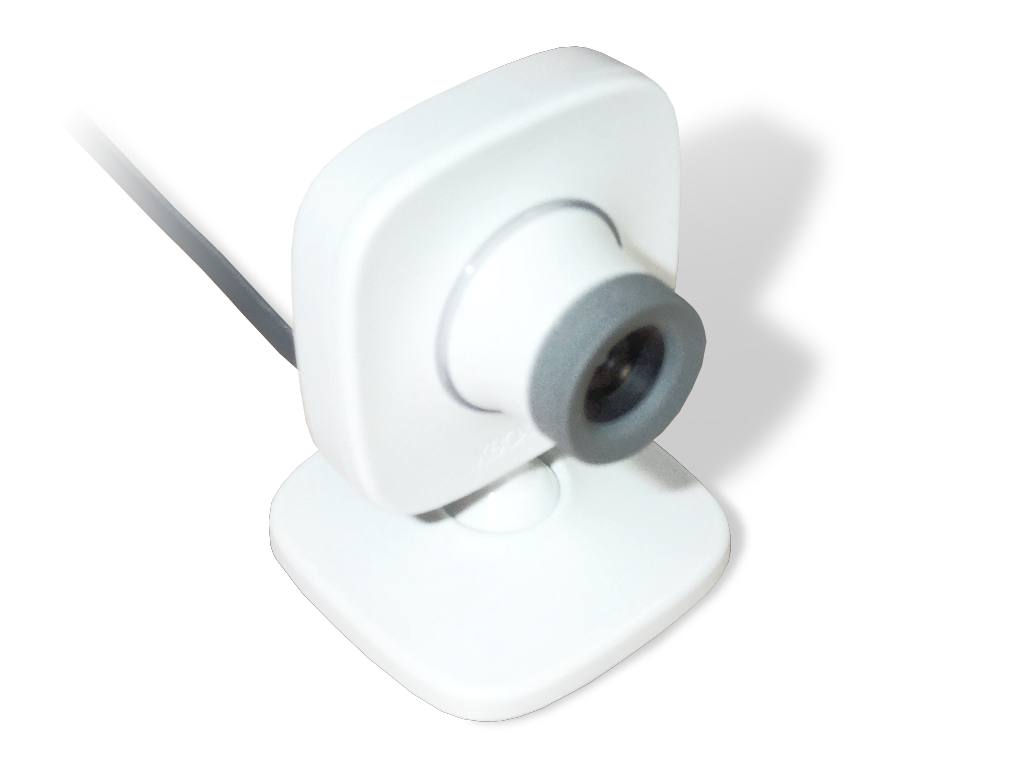
- Xbox Live Vision camera
- Developer: Microsoft
- Manufacturer: Microsoft
- Product family: Xbox
- Type: Gaming Webcam
- Generation: Seventh
- Camera: 640×480 pixels @ 30 Hz; 320x240 pixels @ 60 Hz; FOV 0,12 x 0,10 turns (45 x 34 degrees)
- Connectivity: USB 2.0 type-A
- Platform: Xbox 360; Microsoft Windows (XP SP2 or higher); Mac OS X (10.4.9 or higher); PlayStation 3 (firmware 1.54 or higher)
- Dimensions: 45 mm × 45 mm × 60 mm (1.8 in × 1.8 in × 2.4 in)
- Successor: Kinect
- Related: PlayStation Eye, EyeToy, Kinect, Xbox 360 accessories

Xbox Live Vision is a webcam accessory that was developed as an accessory for the Xbox 360 video game console. It was announced at E3 2006 and was released in North America on September 19, 2006, Europe and Asia on October 2, 2006, and Japan on November 2, 2006.

In 2010, Xbox Live Vision was succeeded by Kinect, a new camera accessory that also incorporates a motion tracking system and adds voice recognition functionality to the console.

== Overview ==
The camera can be used for video chat, personalized gamer pictures, in-game video chat, and still pictures. The camera features 640 × 480 video at 30 fps and is capable of taking still images at 1.3 megapixels. It allows for video chat and picture messages (requires Xbox Live Gold) with video effects along with in-game compatibility. Certain games allow a digital zoom of 2x or 4x while video chatting.

It also features three camera effects, in which the currently captured video image is overlaid on the dashboard background. The three effects are 'watery', 'edgy', and 'dotty'. The camera uses a standard USB 2.0 connection and is also Windows (XP and newer) and Mac OS X (v10.4.9 and newer) compatible.

The Xbox Live Vision Camera was announced at E3 2006 and released in North America on September 19, 2006, following a 1-month pre-launch period in which Toys "R" Us stores in New York City and Los Angeles sold them to build up hype. It was released in Europe and Asia on October 6, 2006, and November 2, 2006, in Japan.

== Compatibility with other platforms ==
=== Windows ===
Using its USB 2.0 connection, the Vision Camera is compatible with Windows XP Service Pack 2 (32-bit only), Windows Vista (32-bit and 64-bit), and Windows 7 (32-bit and 64-bit, although 64-bit is not confirmed by Microsoft). Because the Vision Camera lacks audio input, a microphone must also be connected to the computer for voice chat and audio recording. Drivers are not included with the Vision Camera but can be downloaded automatically by Windows when prompted. One restriction of the Vision cam when used on the Windows is that it will not natively record videos, only take pictures. Additional software may be used to alleviate this problem.

=== Mac OS X ===
Mac OS X 10.4.9 added support for the USB "video class" group of peripherals, which includes the Vision Camera. The Vision Camera works in iChat, Photo Booth, Facetime for Mac, and other applications that use QuickTime for video display, such as Skype. A USB 2.0 connection is also mandatory. The camera continued to work from 10.5 to 10.7, but soon after that support was removed.

=== PlayStation 3 ===
PlayStation 3 system software (firmware) version 1.54 added support for "video class" USB devices, allowing use of the Vision camera, as well as webcams and other similar devices.

=== Linux ===
The Vision Camera works with native support on Linux, tested with v 4.19.66-v7+ on a Raspberry Pi with resolutions up to 960x720.

== Images ==
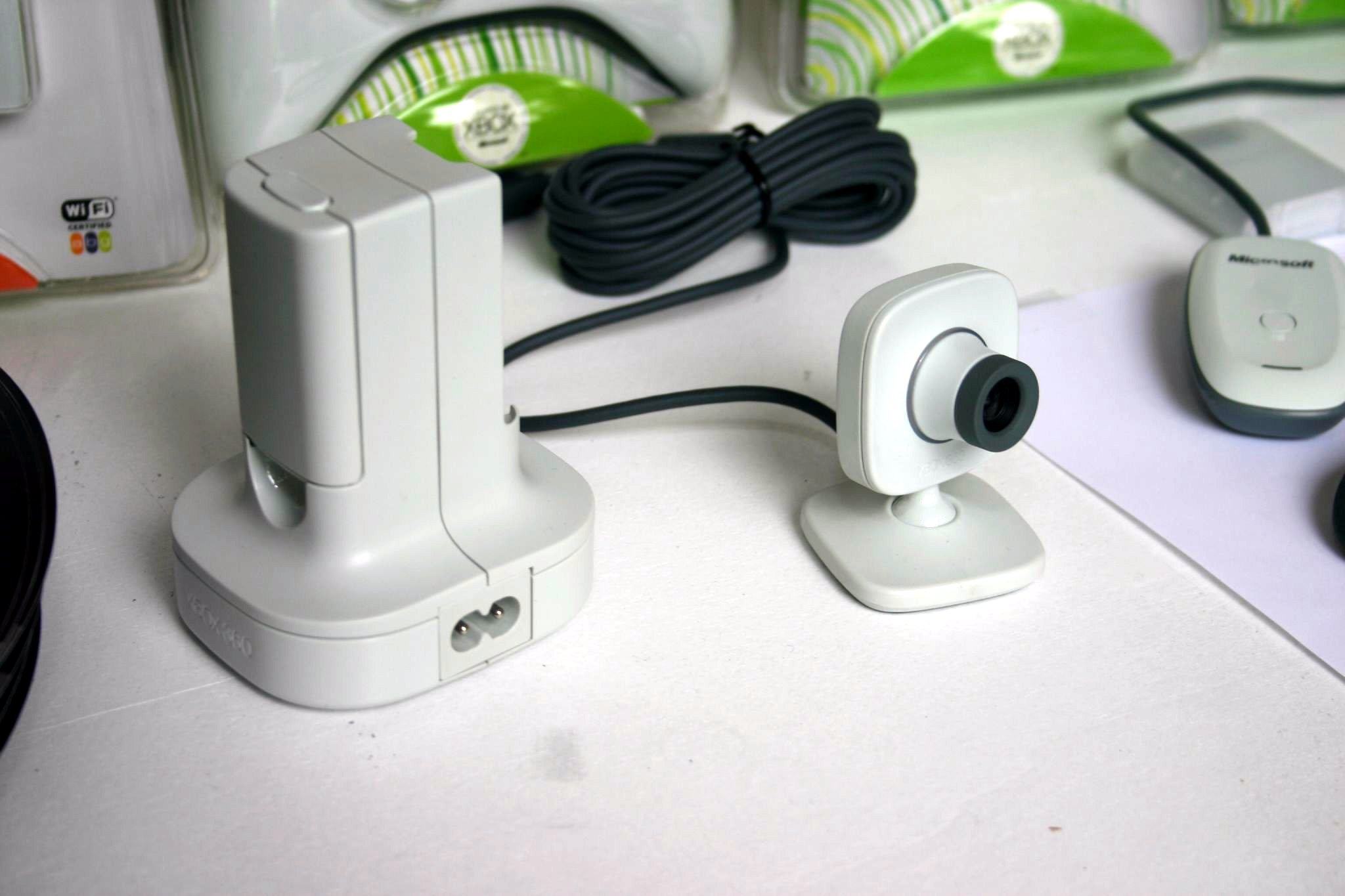
Xbox Live Vision camera at E3 2006

== Compatible games ==
In-game video support

- American Idol Encore
- American Idol Encore 2
- Band of Bugs
- Bankshot Billiards 2
- Battlezone
- Bomberman Live
- Burnout Paradise - Photo taken if the player takes down another player online, wins an online race event and getting a license.
- Call of Duty: Black Ops II
- Carcassonne
- Chessmaster Live
- Civilization Revolution
- Command & Conquer 3: Tiberium Wars
- Domino Master
- Duke Nukem 3D (in lobbies)
- Gin Rummy
- Hardwood Backgammon
- Hardwood Hearts
- Hardwood Spades
- Tom Clancy's Rainbow Six Vegas
- Tom Clancy's Rainbow Six Vegas 2
- Tom Clancy's H.A.W.X. 2
- Lost Cities
- Magic: The Gathering – Duels of the Planeswalkers 2012
- Need for Speed: Hot Pursuit - Used to take profile photo.
- Pinball FX
- Pinball FX 2
- Rocky and Bullwinkle
- Soltrio Solitaire
- Spyglass Board Games
- Texas Hold 'em - 4 person video chat.
- Ticket to Ride
- Uno - 4 person video chat.
- Uno Rush - 4 person video chat.
- Vigilante 8 Arcade
- Warlords
- Wits and Wagers
- Word Puzzle

Controller functionality

- Pinball FX
- Pinball FX 2
- Rayman Raving Rabbids
- TotemBall
- You're in the Movies

Face mapping support (Digimask)

- EA Sports MMA
- FaceBreaker
- FIFA 10
- Fight Night Round 4
- Fight Night Champion
- Football Manager 2007
- Pro Evolution Soccer 2008
- Pro Evolution Soccer 2009
- Pro Evolution Soccer 2010
- Pro Evolution Soccer 2011
- Tiger Woods PGA Tour 08
- Tiger Woods PGA Tour 09
- Tiger Woods PGA Tour 10
- Tiger Woods PGA Tour 11
- Tiger Woods PGA Tour 12
- Tom Clancy's Rainbow Six: Vegas
- Tom Clancy's Rainbow Six: Vegas 2
- World Series of Poker 2008: Battle for the Bracelets

Other

- Viva Piñata: Trouble in Paradise

== See also ==
- Xbox 360 accessories
- PlayStation Eye
