= RedOctane X-Plorer Controller =

Guitar controller

The RedOctane X-Plorer Controller is a controller created by Activision and RedOctane released in bundles with Guitar Hero II for the Xbox 360, some bundles of Guitar Hero III: Legends of Rock, or available separately. This same controller was also bundled with Guitar Hero III: Legends of Rock for the personal computer (PC) and Macintosh. The Xbox 360 controller works with the PC using a driver with Windows (XP SP2 or Vista only). The case for the game disc and manual of Guitar Hero III: Legends of Rock for the PC called the controller the Guitar Hero 3 Official PC Guitar Controller.

The RedOctane X-Plorer Controller for these games is based on the Gibson Explorer, a type of electric guitar. It is also the only guitar controller officially supported by Aspyr Media (developer of the PC and Macintosh releases). The guitar controller plugs into the Xbox 360 via the USB ports. The PC and Macintosh releases have the same software limitation of two local players at a time. The guitar's cord uses the break away cord connection, like controllers of the original Xbox console.

The controller includes two input connections:

- Xbox 360 accessories, like on the Xbox 360 controller
- RJ14 connector, to be used for an Effects pedal add-on that was never released

The insides of the guitar show a few interesting things:

- The RJ14 connector only uses two of the possible four wires (seen on Model number: 95065)
- There are two jumpers (JP1 and JP2) that are labeled on the circuit board, but are unused (seen on Model number: 95065)
- The strum bar is a rocker switch using three wired for connectivity (seen on Model number: 95065)

When the controller is connected to a Windows Vista or Windows XP PC, it shows up as a game controller. This allows you to see button presses and the tilt sensors. Currently, only one tilt sensor is used by the Guitar Hero games.
