= Memory unit =

Memory unit may refer to:

- A computer memory component or device.
- Xbox 360 memory units, flash-based memory devices

== See also ==
- Memory cards in video game consoles
