= Rocky and Bullwinkle (video game) =

2008 video game

- Developer: Zen Studios
- Publisher: Microsoft Game Studios
- Director: Tibor Pongrácz
- Designers: Imre Szigeti; Zoltán Vári
- Programmer: András Biró
- Artists: Barnabás Kovács; Richárd Müller; Attila Róth
- Composers: Bence Bükki; Szabolcs Vándor
- Platform: Xbox 360 (XBLA)
- Release: April 16, 2008
- Genre: Party
- Modes: Single-player, multiplayer

Rocky and Bullwinkle is a party video game compilation developed by Zen Studios for the Xbox Live Arcade service, based on characters and scenes from The Adventures of Rocky and Bullwinkle and Friends. It was released in 2008, marking the first game based on the property since Rocky & Bullwinkle's Know-It-All Quiz Game in 1998.

Upon its release, Rocky and Bullwinkle was critically panned, with many critics citing its poor visuals and gameplay, unresponsive controls and lackluster presentation as well as its poor resemblance to the WarioWare games' "microgame"-focused gameplay.

== Gameplay ==
The core gameplay of Rocky and Bullwinkle revolves around fast-paced minigames that must be completed within a short time limit. This "microgame" format is very similar to that of the WarioWare franchise. Rocky and Bullwinkle has over 100 minigames, each centered around different segments or characters from the cartoon. Minigames are divided into levels dubbed "shows", which are progressively unlocked through the completion of minigames in each show. Each minigame begins with a brief instruction of how the game is played; this is paired with a short description of the game and often a short clip from the cartoon pertaining to the game. After the player completes a certain number of minigames in a show, the player encounters a "boss game", which is essentially a standard minigame with an extended time limit. The game has a "hot-seat" multiplayer mode, in which up to 12 players must pass the controller along in between each minigame. The game utilized the Xbox Live Vision camera in many of its games, although it is entirely playable without the accessory.

Rocky and Bullwinkle gameplay screenshot.

== Reception ==
Rocky and Bullwinkle received largely negative reviews. IGN gave the game a 3/10, with reviewer Ryan Geddes criticizing the game for its poor presentation, visuals and gameplay. In his review he stated, "By the time I was done with Rocky & Bullwinkle, I was not only dissatisfied but also thoroughly confused. Who is the audience for this product? The games are so simplistic that they must be aimed at children, most of whom will have no idea who these characters are. Adults who are familiar with the series will be insulted by the presentation and the childlike controls. And none of the above will have much fun with Rocky & Bullwinkle."

The game has a metascore of 37 on review aggregator Metacritic, indicating "generally unfavorable reviews". Dan Whitehead of Eurogamer gave the game a score of 5/10, with his review stating "..as a whole the game feels undercooked, unpolished and ultimately unsatisfying."
