= Gin Rummy (video game) =

2008 video game

- Developer(s): Sierra Online Shanghai
- Publisher(s): Vivendi Games (Note: Released under the Sierra Online publishing label.)
- Platform(s): Xbox 360 (XBLA)
- Release: September 3, 2008
- Genre(s): Card game
- Mode(s): Single-player, multiplayer

Gin Rummy is a video game adaptation of the classic card game on Xbox Live Arcade for the Xbox 360 published by Vivendi Games under their Sierra Online division and developed by Sierra Online Shanghai, which was formerly known as Studio Ch'in. It was released on September 3, 2008.

== Features ==
Gameplay screenshot.

The game includes six variations of gin rummy, including Classic Gin Rummy, Speed Gin Rummy, Oklahoma Gin, Hollywood Gin, and Three-Hand Gin. Players can also create their own house rules.

The game supports the Xbox Live Vision camera.
