= Wits and Wagers (video game) =

2008 video game

- Developer: Hidden Path Entertainment
- Publisher: Microsoft Game Studios
- Platform: Xbox 360 (XBLA)
- Release: May 7, 2008
- Genre: Party
- Modes: Single-player, multiplayer

Typical gameplay screenshot.

Wits and Wagers is an Xbox Live Arcade title based on the award-winning Wits and Wagers board game. The title was released on May 7, 2008. Wits and Wagers supports the Xbox Live Vision camera and Big Button Pads.

== Reception ==
Reception

Aggregate scores
| Aggregator | Score |
|---|---|
| GameRankings | 60.67% |
| Metacritic | 63/100 |

Review scores
| Publication | Score |
|---|---|
| Eurogamer | 4/10 |
| GamePro | 3/5 |
| GamesRadar+ | 3.5/5 |
| IGN | 6.4/10 |
| TeamXbox | 7/10 |

Wits and Wagers received mixed reviews from critics upon release. On Metacritic, the game holds a score of 63/100 based on 15 reviews, indicating "mixed or average reviews". On GameRankings, the game holds a score of 60.67% based on 15 reviews.

Paul Curthoys of Official Xbox Magazine awarded the game a 9/10, saying that Wits and Wagers is "a genius quiz-show game that ranks right up there with classics like You Don't Know Jack."
