= List of Xbox 360 accessories =

Overview of the accessories made for the Xbox 360

The Xbox 360 game console, developed by Microsoft, features a number of first-party and third-party accessories.

== Game controllers/Gamepads ==
=== Xbox 360 controllers ===
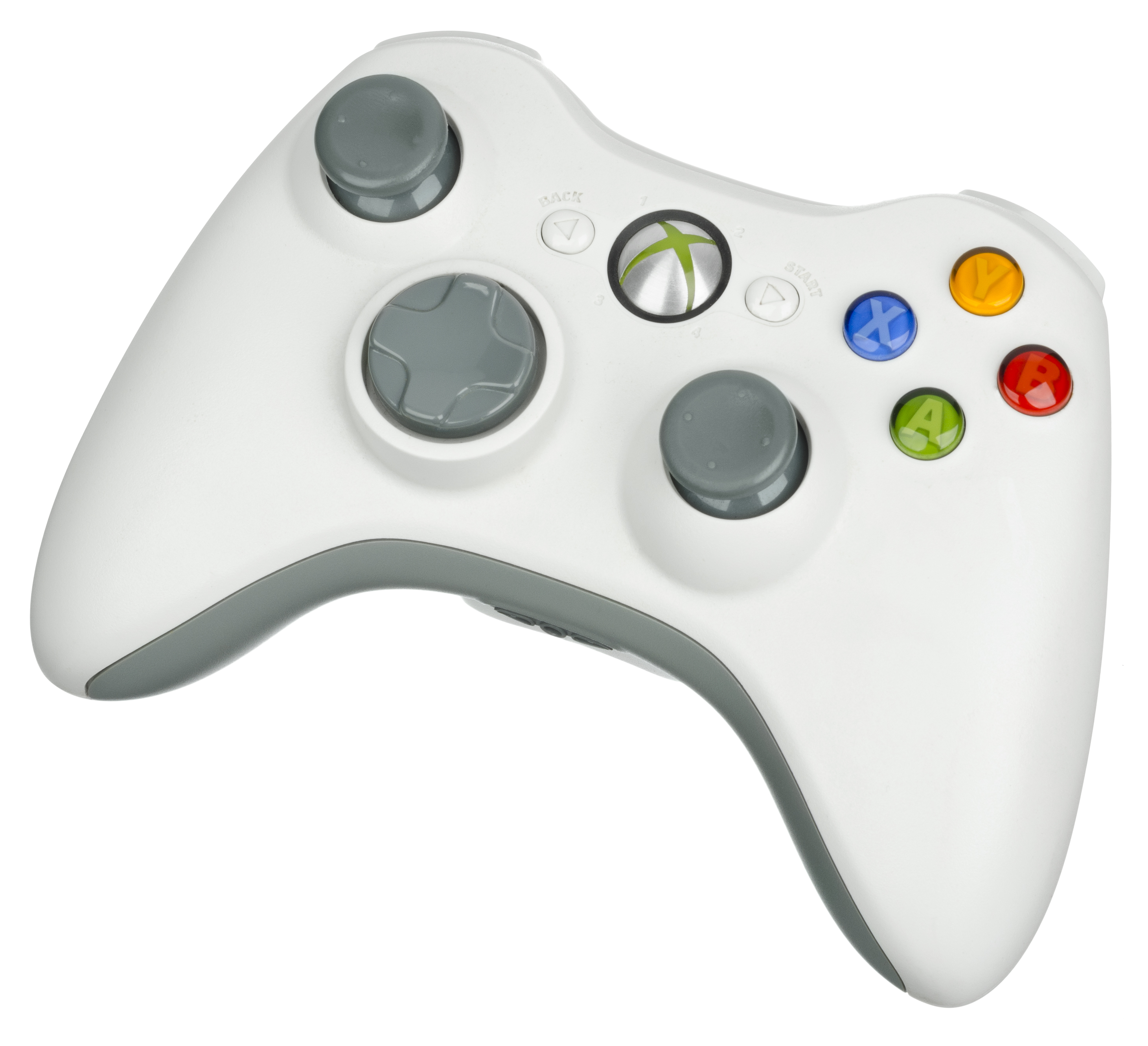
Xbox 360 Wireless controller

Up to four controllers are able to connect to Xbox 360, including wired and wireless gamepads. The wireless controllers run on either AA batteries (Alkaline or rechargeable) or on a rechargeable battery pack. The wired controllers may be connected to any of the USB ports on the console (the number of ports depends on model: old-style 360s have two at the front and one on the rear, while Xbox 360 S units have two at the front and three at the rear), or to a USB hub. USB keyboards are also supported, but only for inputting text and navigating the dashboard; additionally, the number pad and hotkeys are non-functional. The original first-generation Xbox controllers are not compatible with the Xbox 360. The controller is also compatible with PCs, though wireless controllers will need the Wireless Gaming Receiver. The Xbox 360 controller has been used in the United States and British militaries. The Xbox 360 controller has vibration feedback which is limited to titles using the new XInput API, however, unlike the first Xbox, the face buttons are not analog.

==== Wireless Gaming Receiver ====
Wireless Gaming Receiver for Windows
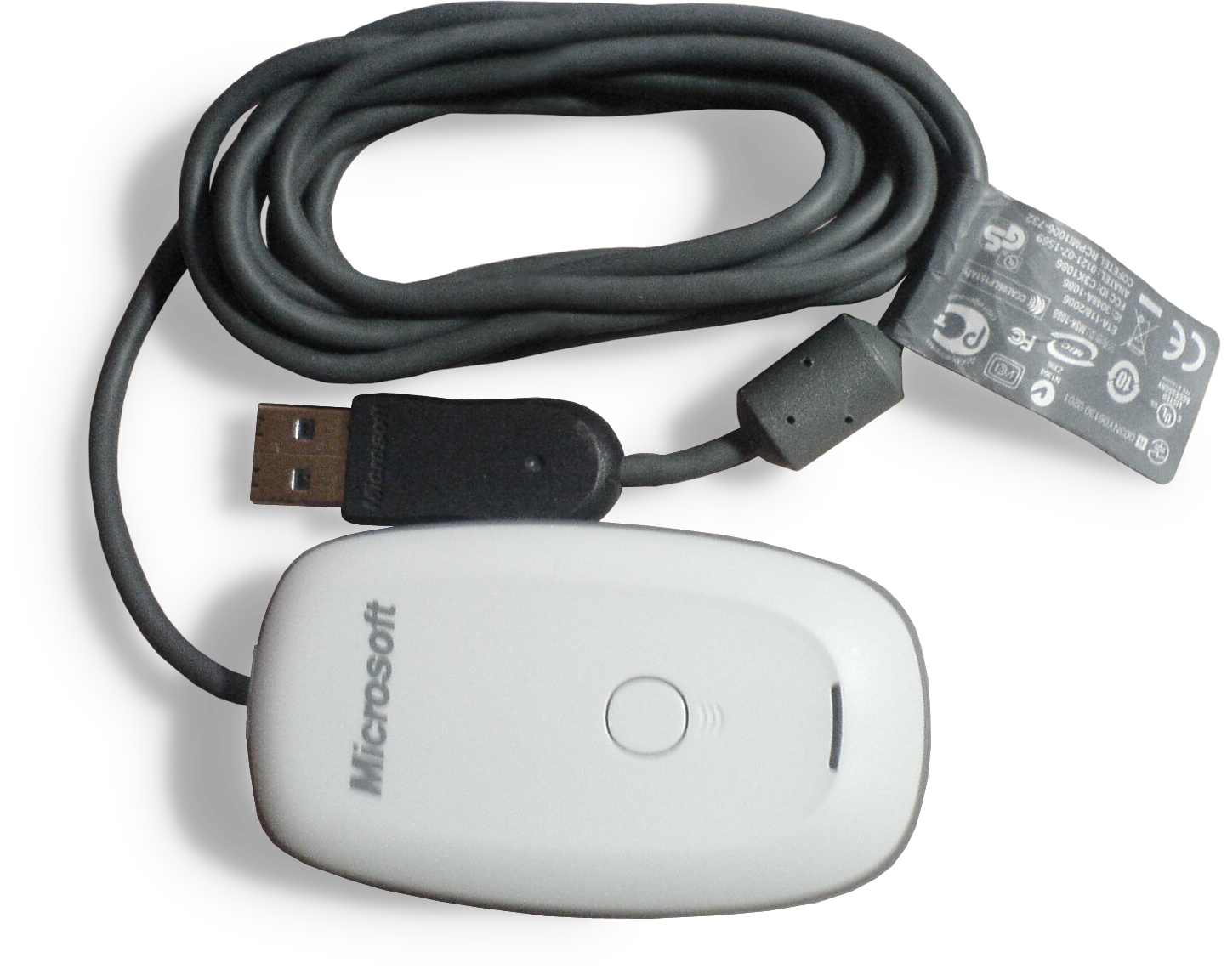
- The Wireless Gaming Receiver for Windows
- Manufacturer: Microsoft
- Generation: Seventh generation era
- Released: February 16, 2007
- Connectivity: USB, Proprietary 2.4 GHz wireless technology

While PS3 and Wii wireless controllers use Bluetooth for connectivity (and can be used with Bluetooth-equipped personal computers with appropriate software), Xbox 360 wireless accessories communicate over a proprietary 2.4 GHz protocol. In order to accommodate this, Microsoft released the Wireless Gaming Receiver (sold as "Crossfire Wireless Gaming Receiver" in the UK), which allows wireless Xbox 360 accessories to be used on a Windows-based PC. Most Xbox 360 wireless accessories are supported, including standard controllers, racing wheels (without force-feedback), headsets and guitar controllers. The adapter was first revealed at E3 2006 and released on February 16, 2007.

The device acts in a similar manner to an Xbox 360, allowing up to four controllers and four headsets at a time to be connected to the receiver. The device has a 30-foot (10 meter) range and a six-foot (2 meter) USB cable. It is specifically designed to work with games bearing the "Games for Windows" logo, but will function with most games that permit a standard PC gamepad. The official Xbox website noted that the adapter will work with "all future wireless devices". However, it is worth noting that the racing wheel does not currently have force feedback support.

One of the issues with using wireless controllers is that there is no way (with the standard Microsoft Xbox controller drivers) to turn the controllers off unless the batteries are removed from the controller or a third-party application is used. Also an issue that has arisen from this product is the amount of power in which the receiver draws. There have been many reports that the receiver will work for days, weeks, or couple of months then fail to "receive" the signal from the Xbox 360 controller. This issue has been solved in a number of ways by end users depending on where the damage from the excess power has manifested itself—in some cases simply purchasing a powered hub (which typically can provide a higher current than a PC port) will fix the issues while in others it may be necessary to work around a blown internal fuse.

In the US, Microsoft has stopped producing the stand-alone receiver and it is increasingly difficult to find in stores or online. The "Wireless Controller for Windows" bundle includes the receiver for a higher price, but is still available.

The Microsoft LifeChat ZX-6000 wireless headset for PC includes a black version of the receiver which works with Xbox 360 wireless accessories.

The Alienware Alpha PC includes an Xbox 360 controller and receiver.

==== Controller accessories ====
===== Rechargeable Battery Pack =====
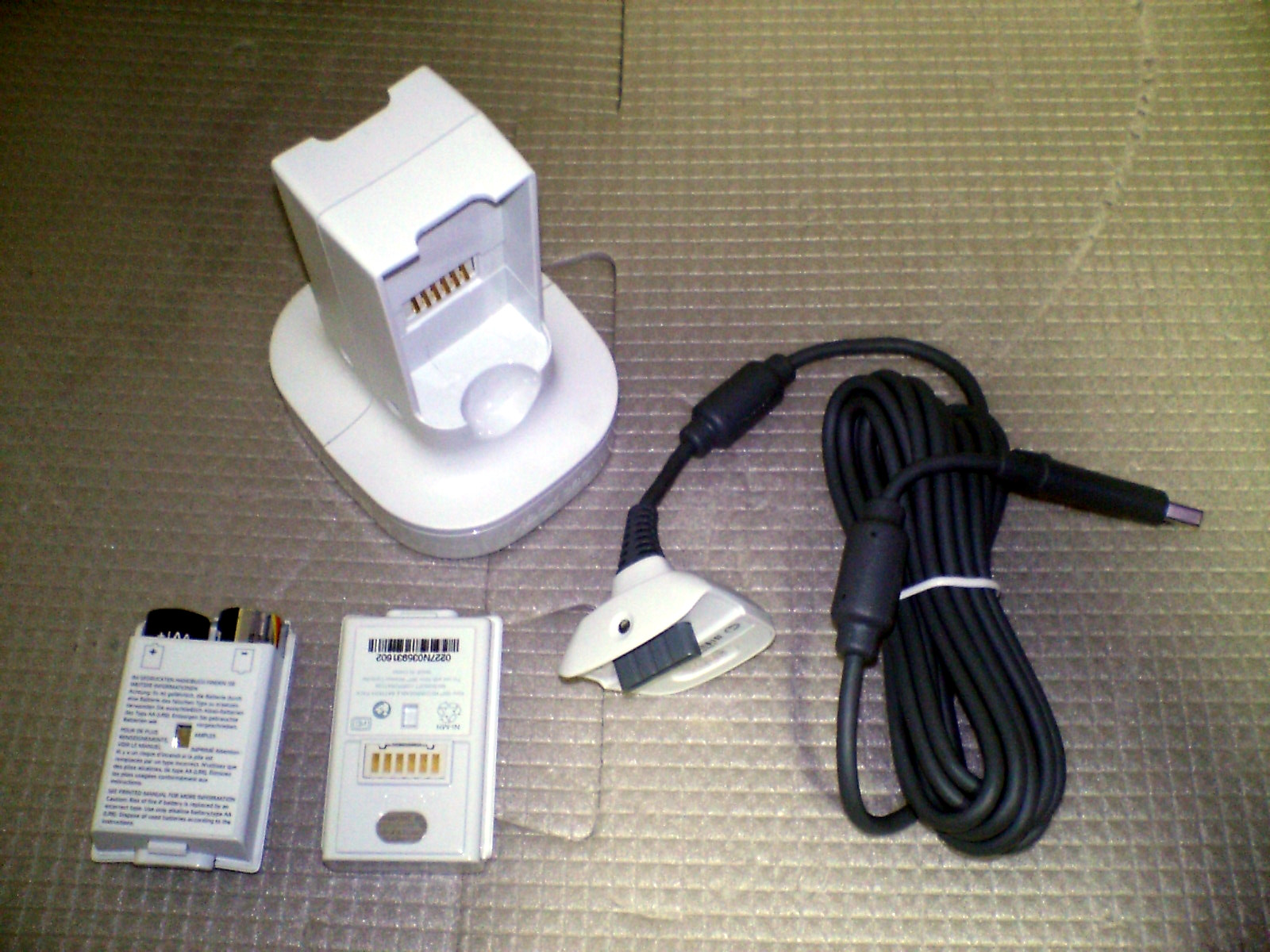
Battery Pack, Play & Charge Cable and Quick Charger

The Rechargeable Battery Pack for the Xbox 360 controller contains two AA nickel metal hydride (NiMH) batteries inside a sealed casing, with a custom connector on the rear to allow charging through the Xbox 360 controller itself. The pack provides up to 25 hours of continuous gaming for the wireless controller. It is recommended in place of disposable AA batteries, due to the replacement cost (in both economic and environmental terms). It also ships as part of both the Play & Charge Kit and Quick Charge Kit. An upgraded version of the Rechargeable Battery Pack, which provides up to 35 hours of gameplay if using the Play & Charge Kit or 40 hours of gameplay if using the Quick Charge Kit, is included with "transforming d-pad" wireless controllers.

To fully charge a battery pack takes approximately 2 hours with the Quick Charge Kit; the Play & Charge Kit takes longer (and depends on whether the controller is being used).

Third party rechargeable battery pack kits are also available. Although the official rechargeable battery pack is NiMH, the normal (AA) battery casing states "Use only Alkaline battery, type AA (LR6)".

===== Play & Charge Kit =====
The Play & Charge Kit contains a rechargeable battery pack and a USB charging cable. Use of the charging cable does not affect the functionality of the controller, and may be used without interruption to game play. The Play & Charge cable also allows use of a wireless controller without a battery pack. When doing so, Microsoft recommends using a AA pack (empty) to avoid damage to the exposed battery compartment. When connected, the controller does not act as a wired controller, but continues to communicate with the console or receiver wirelessly; data is sent via USB to the host only to allow automatic syncing and to initiate charging and does not send controller input data. As a result, the cable need not be plugged into the console or computer the controller is being used with — any convenient powered USB port may be used. The Play & Charge Kit will also automatically sync the controller to a Wireless Gaming Receiver when both are plugged into a Windows computer.

The original Play & Charge Kit contains generic 2100 mAh AA (LR6) NiMH cells. Such cells are readily available in 4 packs up to 3000 mAh, with 2000–2600 mAh batteries being common.

Alongside the release of the Xbox 360 S in June 2010, Microsoft started shipping a "transforming d-pad controller" with an improved Play & Charge Kit and an upgraded rechargeable battery pack. The original Play & Charge Kit provided up to 25 hours of play, the improved Play & Charge Kit provided up to 35 hours of play.

===== Quick Charge Kit =====
The Quick Charge Kit is a small base station that charges up to two rechargeable battery packs and does so in less time than the Play and Charge Kit. It comes with a dual-charger and one rechargeable battery pack. It takes 2 hours for each of 2 rechargeable battery packs to be fully charged. A light on the unit is used to indicate status, showing green when it is finished charging/fully charged and red when charging is in progress.

Alongside the release of the Xbox 360 S in June 2010, Microsoft started shipping an improved Quick Charge Kit with two upgraded rechargeable battery packs. The original Quick Charge Kit gave up to 25 hours of play to the original rechargeable battery packs, the improved Quick Charge Kit gave up to 40 hours of play to the upgraded rechargeable battery packs.

===== Messenger Kit =====
Xbox 360 Messenger Kit
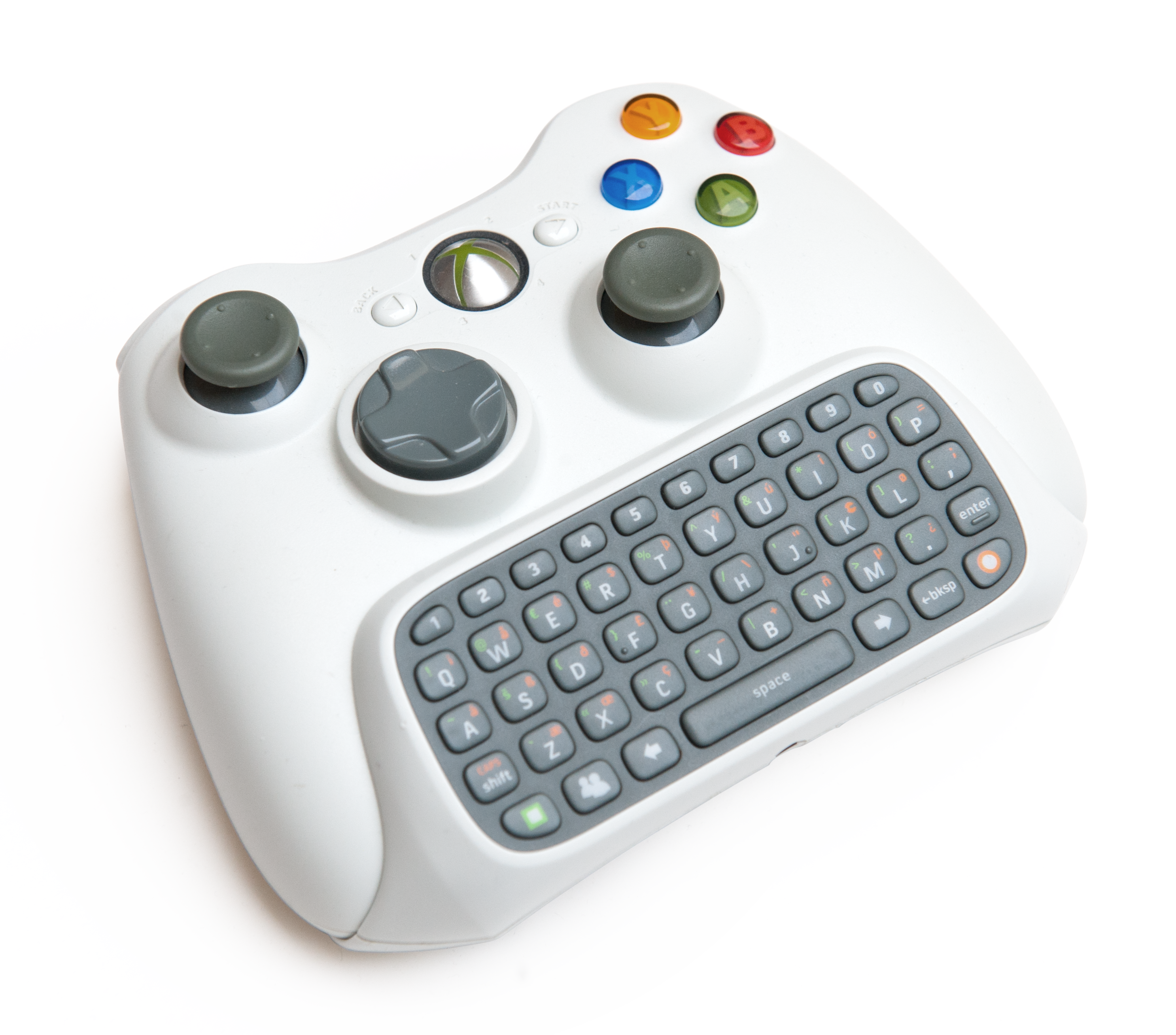
- Xbox 360 Chatpad from the Messenger Kit attached to a wireless controller
- Manufacturer: Microsoft
- Type: Gaming keypads, Add-on device
- Generation: Seventh generation era
- Lifespan: September 4, 2007
- Input: QWERTY keyboard
- Connectivity: USB (custom connector), 2.5 mm headset connector (for compatibility with headset add-on)

On September 4, 2007, Microsoft released a small keyboard accessory called the Chatpad to coincide with the launch of Xbox Live Windows Live Messenger on Xbox 360. It was released in white and black colors as part of the Xbox 360 Messenger Kit, which also includes a wired headset. This is partly due to the fact that older Xbox 360 wired headsets cannot connect to the Chatpad due to the side pins. The Chatpad connects to the controller via two power pins and a UART interface located on the front of the controller (wireless or wired), as well as the 2.5 mm jack for headset compatibility.

Although the Chatpad can be used to communicate with people that are on Xbox Live and Windows-based PCs (via Windows Live Messenger), Microsoft never provided drivers to make the Chatpad itself work with a PC. There was no official word when, if ever, a driver would be released. However, there were some attempts at a workaround.

Originally since the Chatpad has a connector for wired headset compatibility, when connected to a controller the Chatpad is detected as a wired headset. As a result, the controller could not be paired with a wireless headset since wired headsets take precedence over wireless ones in the systems software. This has been since fixed via software updates and all functions now operate normally.

The Chatpad can also be used in certain games for text input.

USB HID-compliant keyboards can be plugged directly into the console to perform the same function.

=== Universal Media Remote ===
Xbox 360 Universal Media Remote
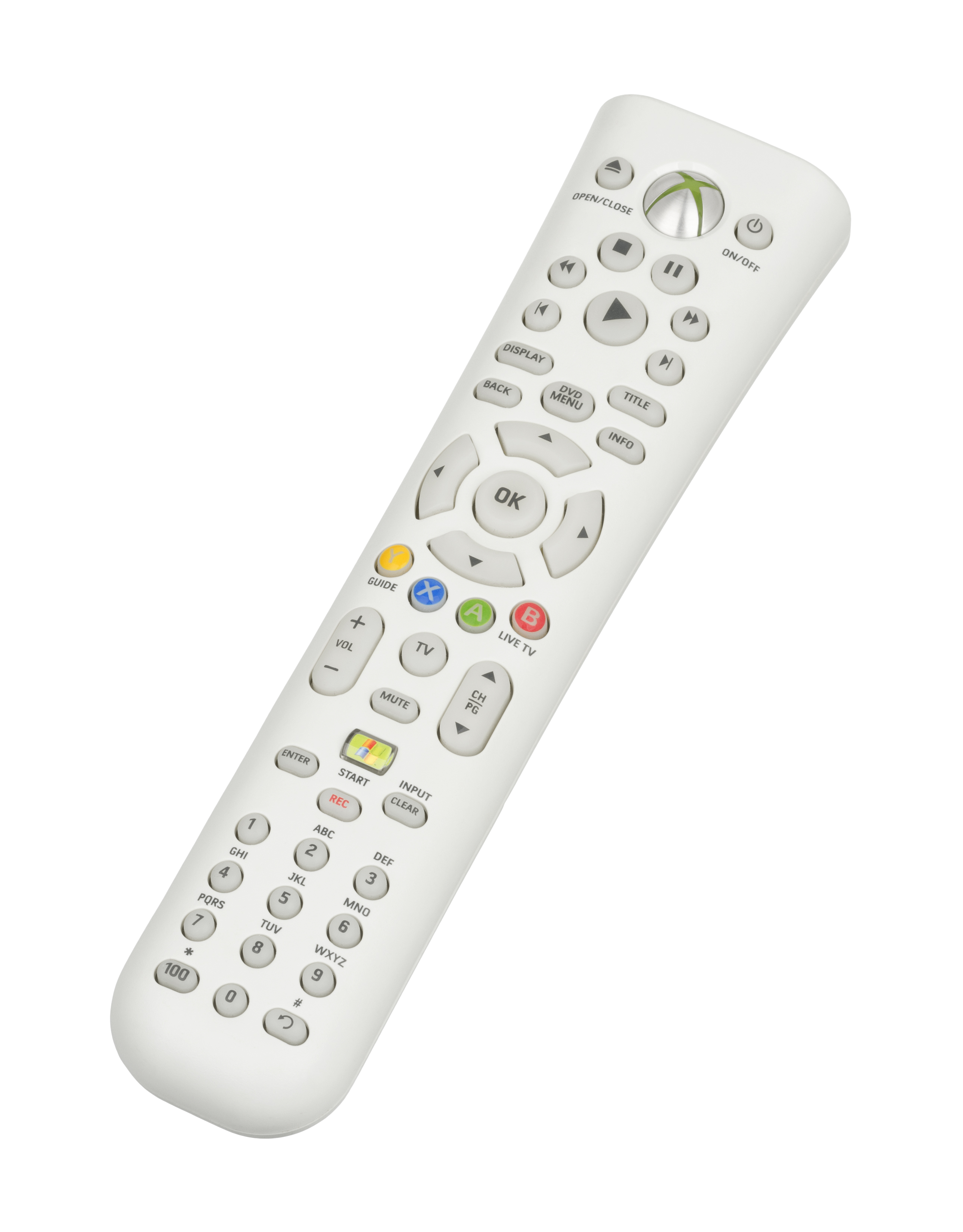
- The long version of the Xbox 360 Universal Media Remote
- Manufacturer: Microsoft
- Generation: Seventh generation era
- Connectivity: Infrared
- Power: 2 × AA battery

There are two official versions of the Xbox 360 Universal Media Remote and a number of unofficial ones. The first official media remote is the shorter version of the Universal Media Remote that can be bought at retail. It was supplied at launch with the Xbox 360 Pro, and replaces the Xbox 360 Wired Headset in the Australian and Mexican Xbox 360 Pro consoles, as well as the Brazilian official pack. These were sold in limited quantities. The second official media remote is longer, and includes number keys. It was also sold in retailers as a standalone product. All remotes can assist in the playing of DVD movies and music (although the console can play such media without the remote), while the Universal Media Remote offers more function by having the ability to serve as a control for a number of TVs or Windows Media Center-based PC. All remotes allow basic control of games, along with being able to navigate the dashboard. The remote control allows for controlling portions of the interface of the Xbox 360 via infrared.

=== Media Remote ===
Xbox 360 Media Remote
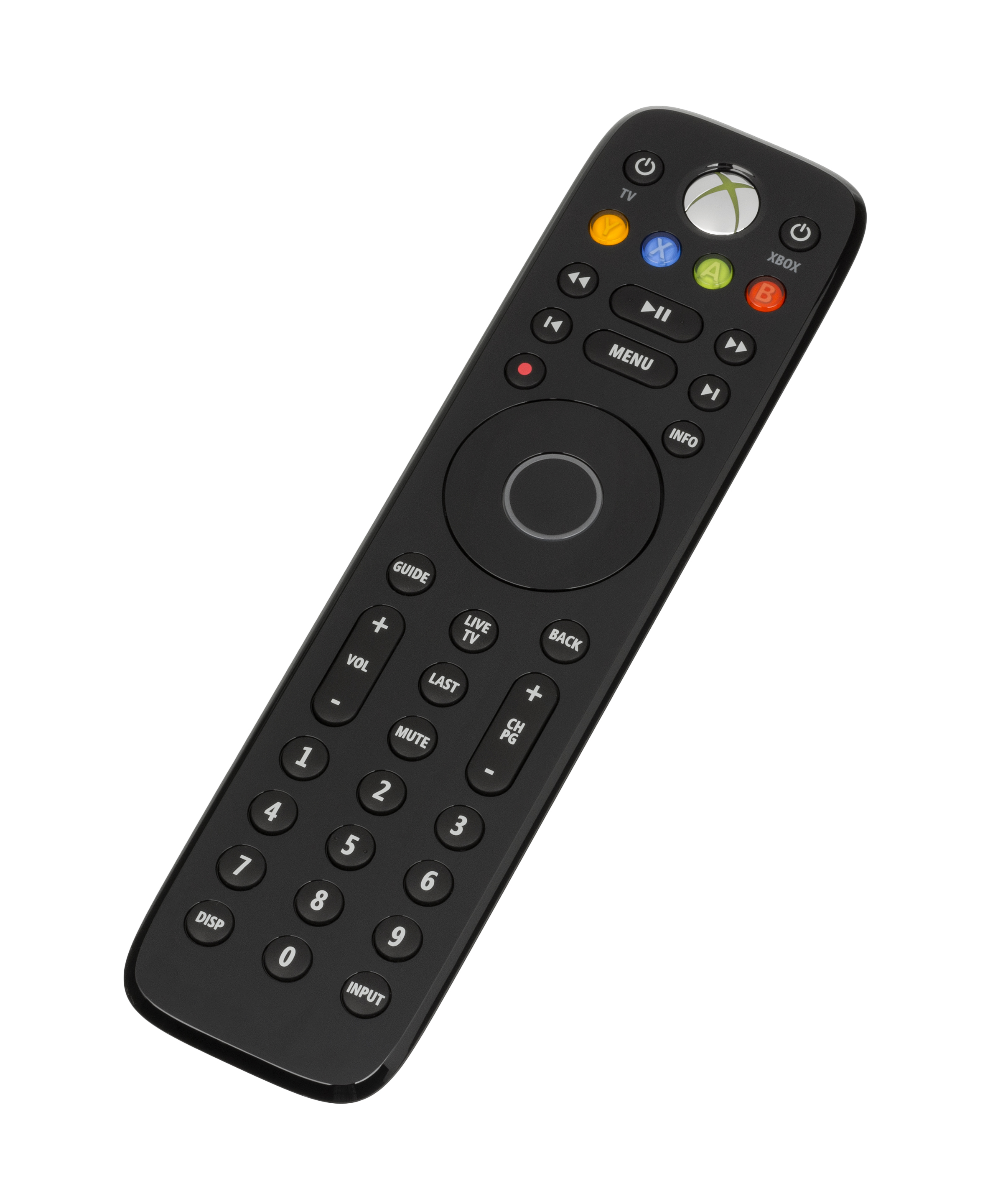
- The Xbox 360 Media Remote
- Manufacturer: Microsoft
- Generation: Seventh generation era
- Connectivity: Infrared
- Power: 2 × AAA Battery

In late 2011, Microsoft replaced the Universal Media Remote with a redesigned model called the Xbox 360 Media Remote. The new remote is black rather than white, and is designed to more closely resemble Xbox 360 Elite and Xbox 360 S consoles. The Media Remote is also capable of controlling the power and volume of various TV sets. Unlike the Universal Media Remote, the Xbox 360 runs on AAA batteries.

=== Xbox 360 Wireless Racing Wheel ===
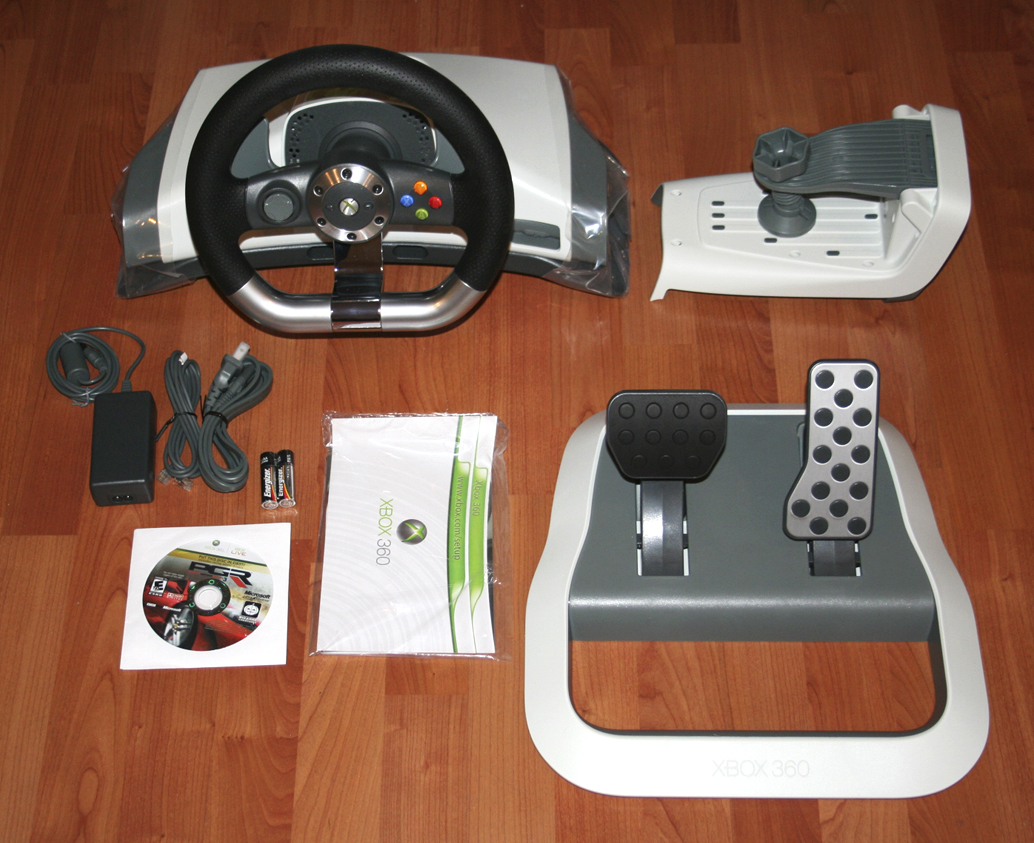
Xbox 360 Wireless Racing Wheel

The Xbox 360 Wireless Racing Wheel was introduced by Microsoft at E3 2006. Released in November 2006, the force feedback steering wheel controller includes the standard gamepad buttons and floor-mounted accelerator and brake pedals. Although the wheel is capable of running off the rechargeable battery pack, use of the force feedback and active resistance features requires an external AC adapter.

A limited edition of the force feedback wheel included the racing game Project Gotham Racing 3. There is also a "Hardcore Pack" for Test Drive Unlimited which makes the driving more realistic.

On August 22, 2007, Microsoft published a press release on Xbox.com saying that they will retrofit all the Wireless Racing Wheels for free that were manufactured from 2006 to 2007. This is due to a component in the wheel chassis that in rare cases may overheat and fail when the AC adapter is used to power the wheel. Users had to ship their wheel back to Microsoft for repair or replacement.

When the price of this accessory was dropped to $99, it was discontinued in November 2007.

Other wheels include the Fanatec Porsche 911 Turbo S Racing Wheel, which features force feedback, 6-speed shifter, sequential shifter and clutch pedal, and the Mad Catz Dale Earnhardt Jr./NASCAR Racing wheel.

=== Xbox 360 Wireless Speed Wheel ===
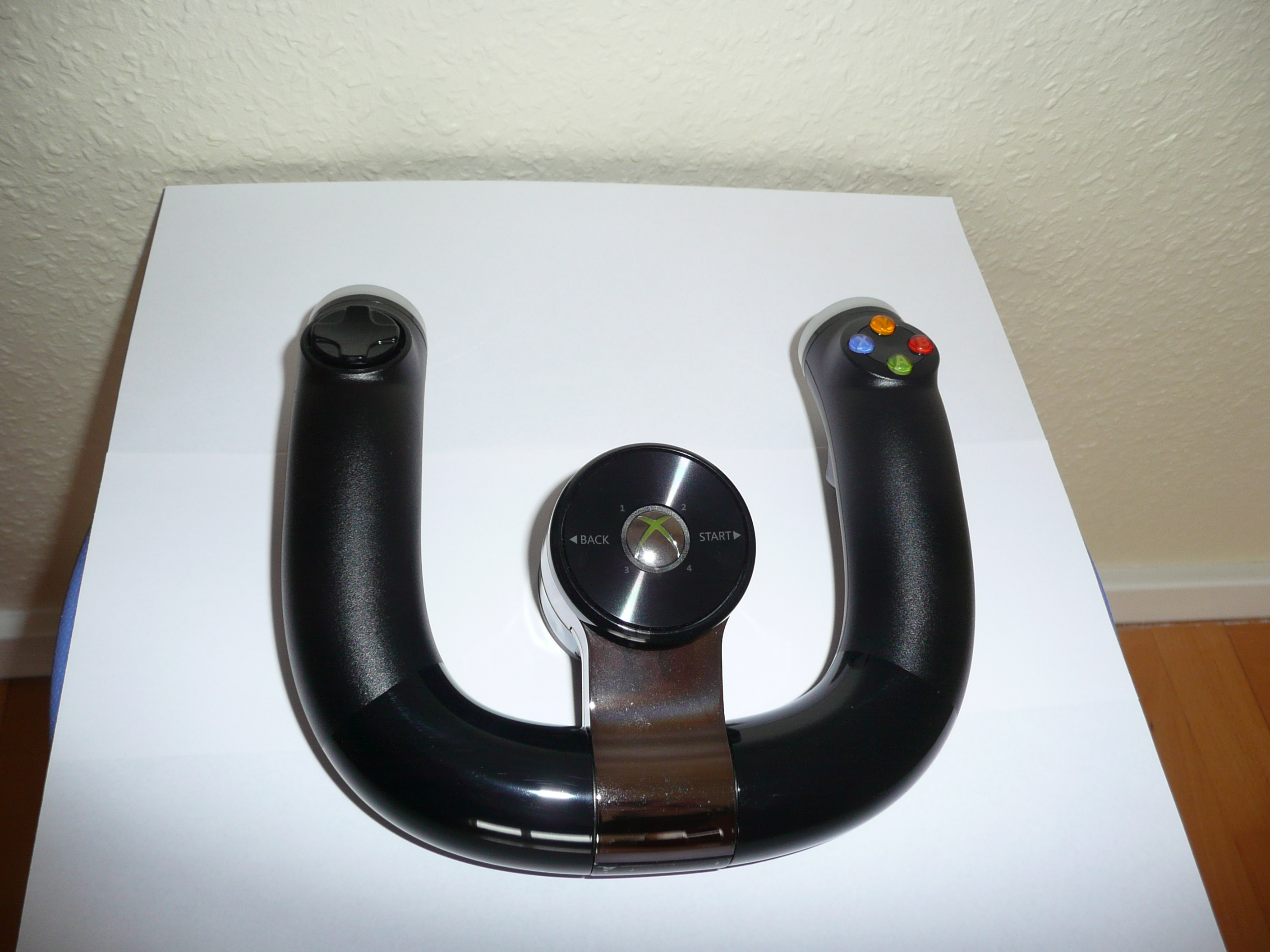
Xbox 360 Wireless Speed Wheel

The Xbox 360 Wireless Speed Wheel was released by Microsoft on September 26, 2011.

It is a successor to the Xbox 360 Wireless Racing Wheel and features a directional pad, the four colored action buttons and two triggers also found on the standard Xbox 360 controller. In addition thereto it features an accelerometer for sensing rotation. It is not capable of registering motion in three dimensions.

=== Big Button Pad ===
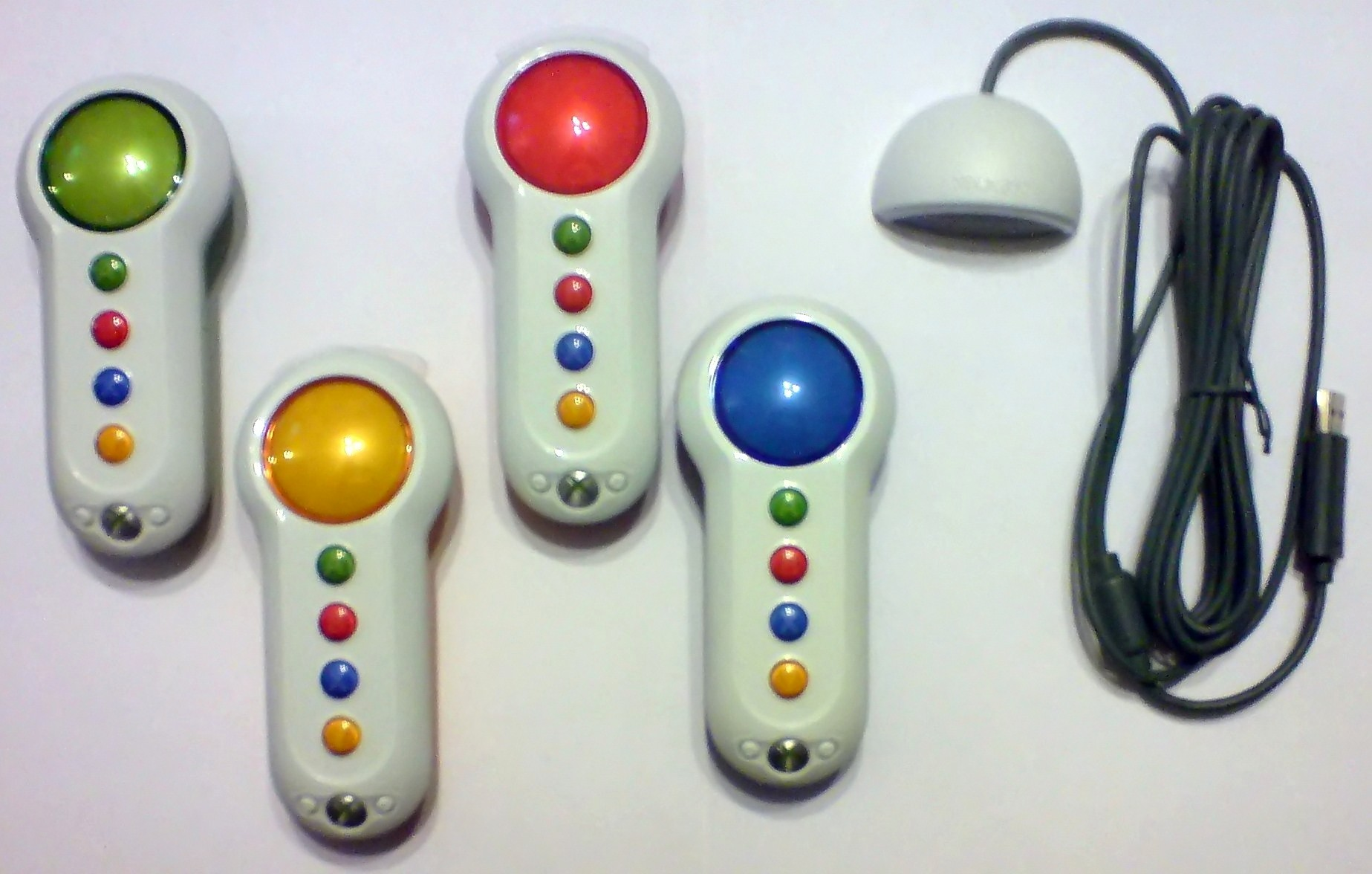
Xbox 360 Big Button Pads with the infrared receiver

The games Scene It? Lights, Camera, Action and Scene It? Box Office Smash come bundled with four special wireless controllers called Big Button Pads, which work similarly to the Buzz! buzzer controllers. Each controller has one large "buzzer" button at the top and four smaller buttons for answering multiple-choice questions. The large buzzer button also functions as a four-way directional pad, which helps to navigate the Xbox 360 dashboard menu. The games' prices are unaffected by the inclusion of the controllers. Other games such as Uno, 1 vs. 100, Wits and Wagers, and You Don't Know Jack have added support for the Big Button Pads.

The Big Button Pads use an external IR receiver that connects to the Xbox 360 via USB. When the external IR receiver is connected all four quadrants on the 'ring of light' are lit to tell the user that four controller devices are active. These Big Button Pads can be used at the same time as the wired and wireless gamepads and the wireless headsets.

=== Xbox 360 Arcade GameStick ===
The Xbox 360 Arcade GameStick from Mad Catz has a full size joystick and spinner control. It comes with the Xbox Live Arcade games Frogger, Time Pilot, and Astropop. It is officially licensed by Microsoft.

=== Rhythm game controllers ===
Musical and rhythm games such as Guitar Hero and Rock Band may use controllers in the shape of musical instruments (often slightly scaled down) including a wide variety of electric guitar and drum kit controllers compatible with the Xbox 360 as well as with other game consoles. An actual MIDI keyboard can be used as a game controller by means of an adapter, while a keyboard-type controller may also be used as a real MIDI musical instrument. The game DJ Hero may use a controller in the shape of a DJ turntable.

=== Xbox 360 Wireless Microphone ===
The Xbox 360 Wireless Microphone is a microphone peripheral designed for use with the rhythm games, Rock Band, Guitar Hero, DJ Hero, Lips, Def Jam Rapstar and Michael Jackson: The Experience. The wireless microphone uses the same 2.4 GHz protocol as the official wireless controller and other peripherals and is powered by 2 AA batteries.

=== Ace Combat 6 Flight Stick ===
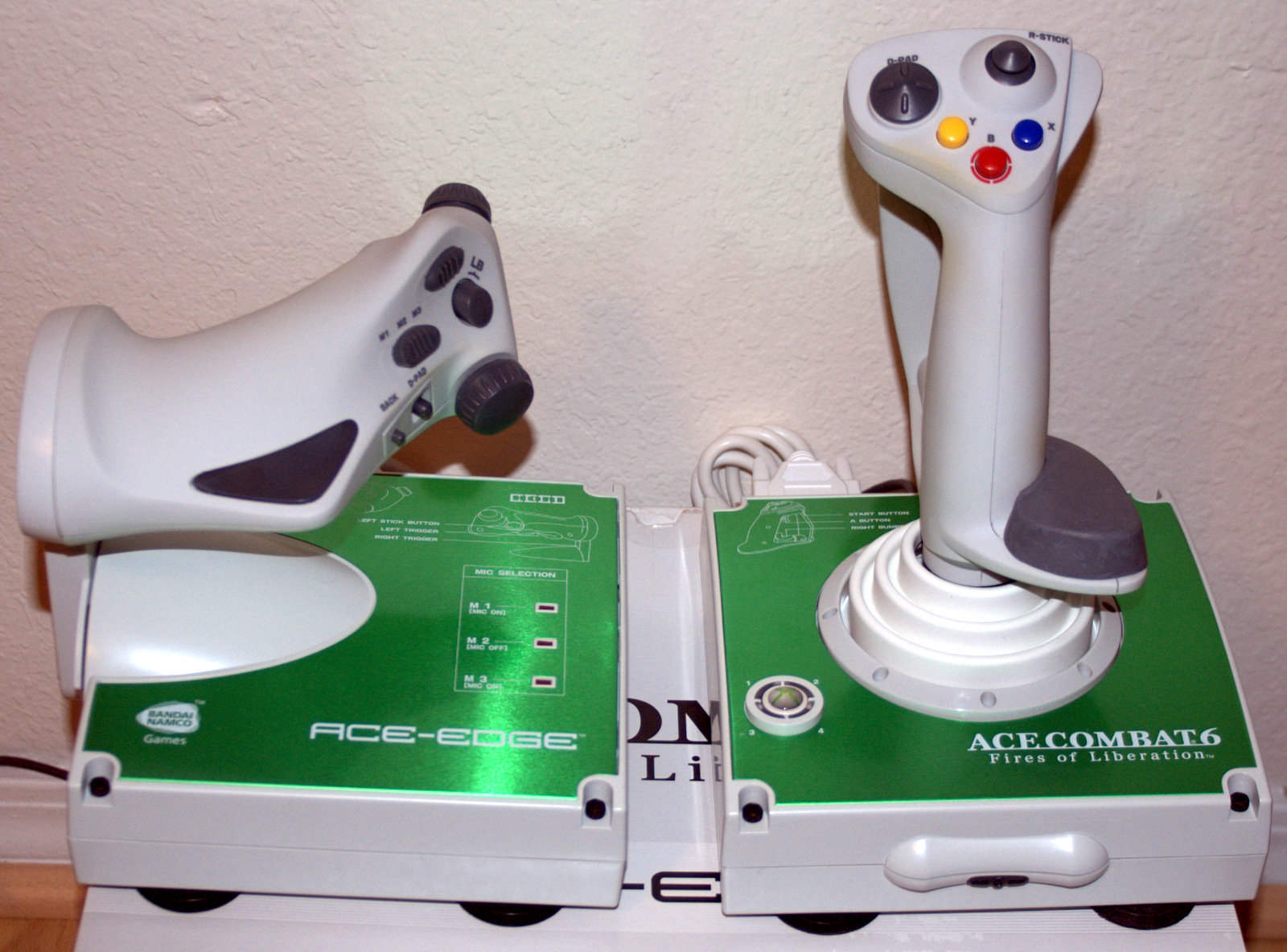
Flight Stick for Ace Combat 6: Fires of Liberation

Produced by Hori, the Xbox 360 Ace Combat 6 Flight Stick was only made available for purchase in a special-limited edition package of Ace Combat 6: Fires of Liberation. The Ace Edge package was officially released only in North America and Japan.

=== Kinect ===
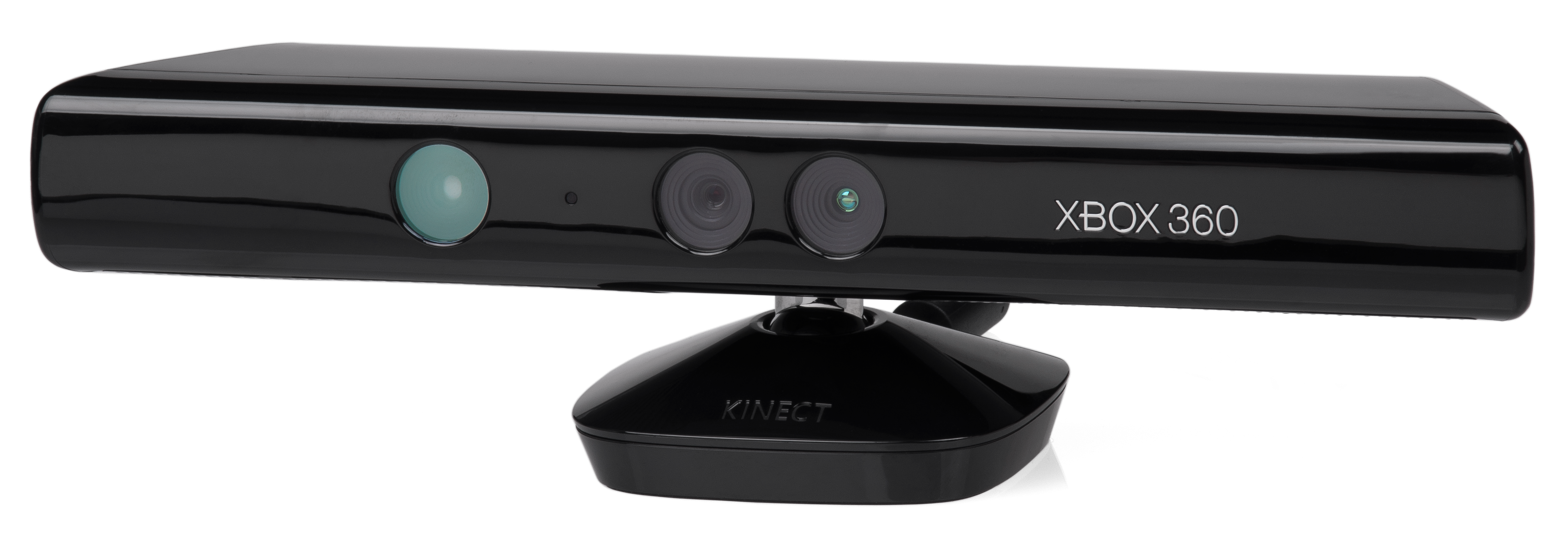
The Kinect sensor device

Kinect (codename "Project Natal") is a "controller-free gaming and entertainment experience" produced by Microsoft for the Xbox 360. Based on an add-on peripheral for the console, it enables users to control and interact with the Xbox 360 without the need to touch a game controller for most of the menus and gameplay through a natural user interface using gestures, spoken commands or presented objects and images. The project is aimed at broadening the Xbox 360's audience beyond its typical gamer base. It was first released on November 4, 2010, in North America, with other regions following later that month.

Nyko has released a 'Zoom' attachment for the Kinect camera that allows people to use the system without having very large open spaces in their living rooms.

=== Other ===
==== uDraw GameTablet ====
The uDraw GameTablet is a graphics tablet designed to be used with various games. It was produced by THQ and released for the Xbox 360 on November 15, 2011. The PlayStation 3 and Xbox 360 versions of the uDraw were a commercial failure and were discontinued in February 2012, THQ would eventually file for bankruptcy the following year.

==== Tony Hawk Shred Board ====
A wireless skating board for Tony Hawk: Shred (and Ride) games. Replaces the previous Tony Hawk Ride Board, also by Activision. (Ride board is not forward compatible with Shred game.)

== Audio/visual peripherals ==
=== A/V connectors and cables ===
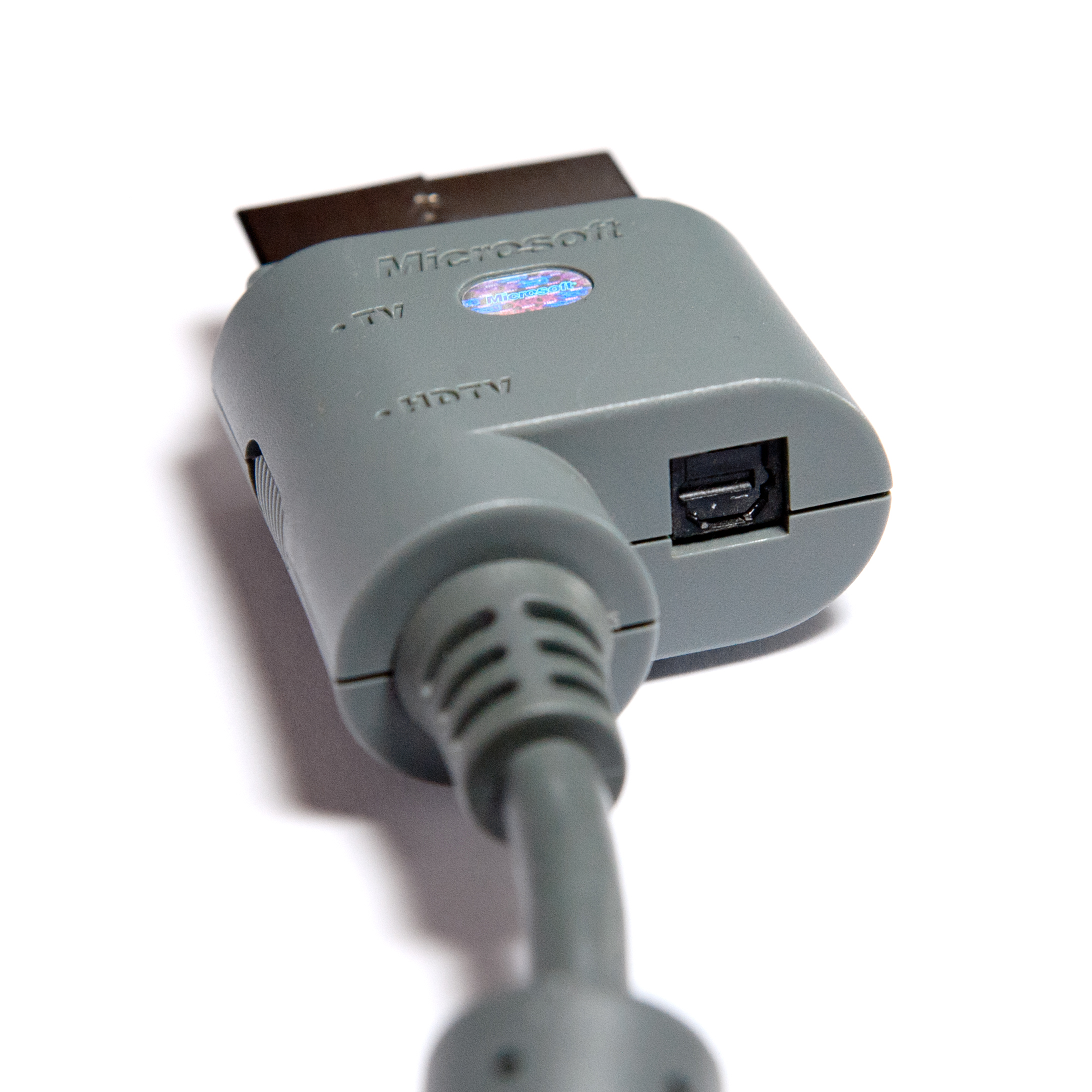
Rear of the A/V connector found on pre-2010 (grey) Component and D-Terminal HD A/V Cables, with TOSLINK-out and TV/HDTV switch. Pre-2010 S-Video, Advanced SCART and VGA HD A/V Cables feature a similar connector but lack the switch.

Various official A/V cables are available for the Xbox 360, which allow it to connect to a broad range of audio and video equipment. Originally available in grey, all cables were replaced by black versions (which also differ in design) with the launch of the Xbox 360 S in June/July 2010.

All official cables (except for the HDMI cable) connect to the Xbox 360's A/V connector and are compatible with original and S models of the Xbox 360. The Xbox 360 E does not include the A/V connector and supports HDMI output only. Analog stereo audio is output by these cables by RCA connectors, with the exception of the Advanced SCART A/V Cable, where it is delivered via the SCART connector's audio pins. With the exception of the VGA HD A/V Cable cable and HDMI Audio Adapter, all cables are also capable of outputting SD video at 480i/60 Hz (NTSC or PAL60, depending on console region) and 576i/50 Hz (PAL; only available on PAL region consoles). A TOSLINK optical S/PDIF connector was integrated into the A/V connector (console side) of many pre-2010 (grey) Xbox 360 A/V cables, allowing output of stereo LPCM, Dolby Digital 5.1 and Dolby Digital with WMA Pro audio. These do not feature on current A/V cables. All official A/V-based cables (except the HDMI Audio Adapter) physically block the HDMI port when plugged into equipped models; on pre-2010 (grey) cables this is due to the size of the connector, while 2010 (black) cables feature a plastic tab for this purpose.

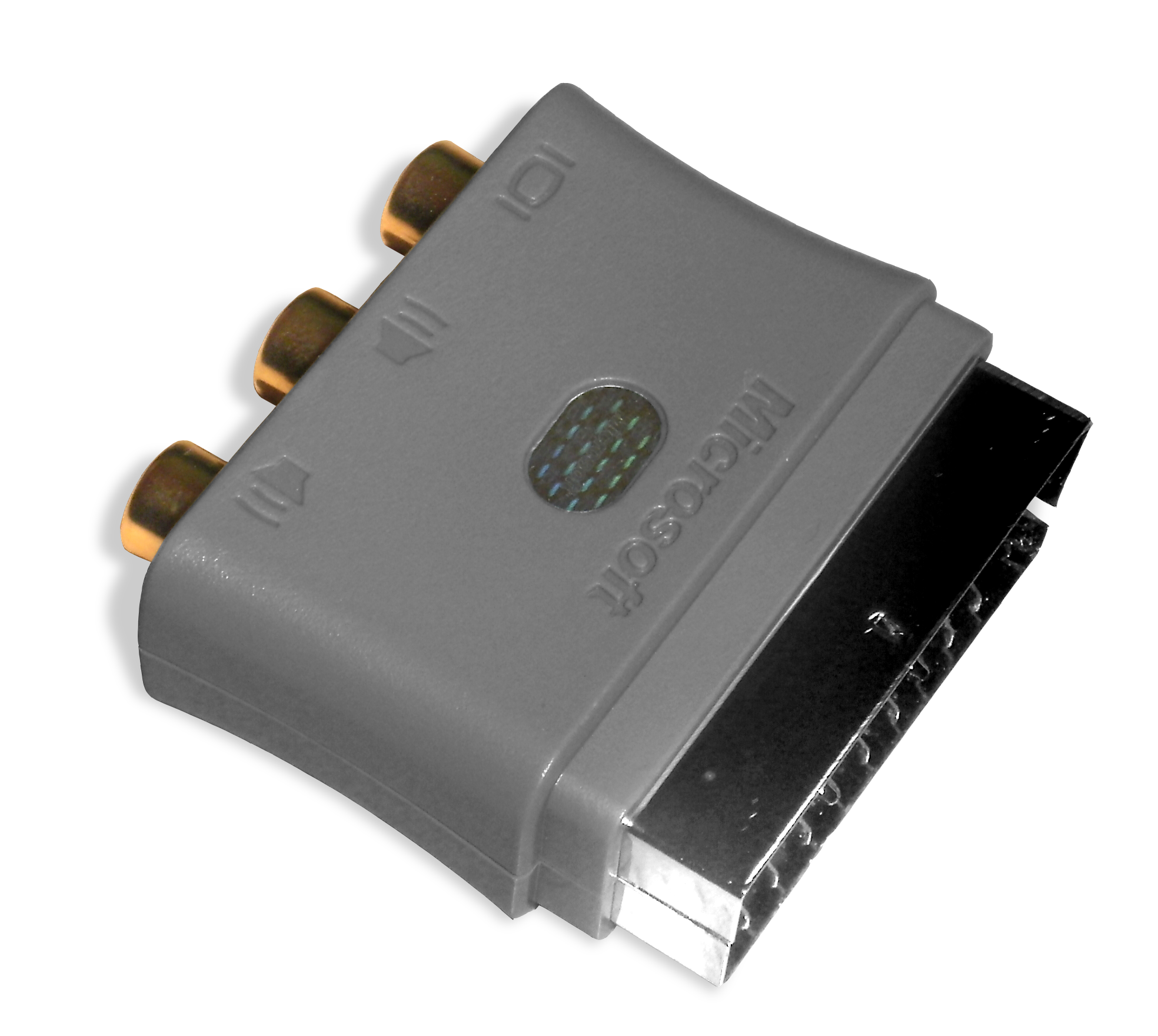
Microsoft composite SCART adapter block (original grey version)

All European Xbox 360 consoles ship with a Microsoft branded composite/stereo audio to SCART adapter block in addition to whichever standard A/V cable the model in question ships with. This allows the composite video cable and other RCA-composite capable cables to be used with SCART equipped televisions. The signal is not changed in any way and the adapter does not offer any improvement in quality over a direct composite connection. It is not to be confused with the advanced SCART cable, which uses the superior RGB standard.

Official Xbox 360 A/V cables
Cable	Supported video standard(s)	HDTV resolutions^{[a]}	PC resolutions^{[b]}	Connector(s) (non-TOSLINK/Xbox 360 A/V)	Integrated TOSLINK connector (grey/pre-2010 only)	Notes	Picture
Composite A/V cable	Composite video	No	No	3 × RCA (male); composite video; left audio; right audio	No	Comes bundled with all current Xbox 360 models, as well as the now discontinued Core, Arcade and Elite (after September 2009) models.; Poorest quality video signal	Original (grey) Xbox 360 composite cable
S-Video A/V Cable	S-Video, composite video	No	No	1 × 4-pin mini-DIN (male — s-video); 3 × RCA (male); composite video; left audio; right audio	Yes	Offers higher picture quality than a standard composite connection, but is poorer quality than other connection types.	
Advanced SCART A/V Cable	RGBS (SCART), composite video	No	No	1 × 21-pin SCART connector (male)	Yes	Only available in Europe and Australasia.	Original (grey) Xbox 360 Advanced SCART cable
Component HD A/V Cable	YP_{B}P_{R} component video, composite video (pre-2010)^{[d]}	Dependent on application^{[c]}	No	6 (pre-2010) / 5 (2010+) × RCA (male)^{[d]}; Y component; P_{B} component; P_{R} component; composite video (pre-2010)^{[d]}; left audio; right audio	Yes	Bundled with all Pro (20 GB/60 GB) models and Elite models prior to September 2009 (outside Japan), was also bundled with the Xbox 360 Slim. Also available separately.; Pre-2010 version features a switch on the side of the A/V connector to switch between "TV" (composite/SD component) and "HDTV" (ED/HD component - 480p-1080p) modes.	Xbox 360 Component HD A/V Cable
D-Terminal HD A/V Cable (D 端子 HD A/V ケーブル)	YP_{B}P_{R} component video, composite video	Dependent on application^{[c]}	No	1 × D-Terminal connector (male); 3 × RCA (male); composite video; left audio; right audio	Yes	Only available in Japan.; Bundled with all Japanese Pro (20 GB/60 GB) models and Elite models prior to September 2009 (also available separately).; Features a switch on the side of the A/V connector to switch between "TV" (composite/D1) and "HDTV" (D2-D5 - 480p-1080p) modes.	
VGA HD A/V Cable	RGBHV (VGA)	Supports 480p, 720p and 1080p equivalent resolutions	Yes	1 × HD-15/VGA (male); 2 × RCA (male); left audio; right audio	Yes	Comes bundled with Female → Female HD-15 gender changer and 2 × RCA → stereo 3.5 mm TRS/mini-jack adapter.	Original (grey) Xbox 360 VGA cable
HDMI cable	RGBHV (HDMI)	Yes	Yes	2 × HDMI (male — standard HDMI cable)	Digital audio available via HDMI connection	Bundled with Elite models prior to September 2009 (also available separately).; An HDMI Audio Adapter or modified/third-party cable is required for TOSLINK (on non Xbox 360 S models) or analog audio connections.; HDMI is not available on Core models or 20 GB Pro models manufactured before July 2007.	Original (grey) Xbox 360 HDMI cable
HDMI Audio Adapter	—N/a	—N/a	—N/a	2 × RCA (female); left audio; right audio	Yes	Designed to provide TOSLINK and analog audio capabilities alongside HDMI cable.; Bundled with all official Xbox 360 HDMI cables (prior to the launch of the Xbox 360 S) and Elite models prior to September 2009.; AV connector is noticeably slimmer than on other A/V cables to facilitate connection alongside HDMI cable.	Xbox 360 HDMI Audio Adapter

a Supported HDTV resolutions (all displayed at 60 Hz): 480p, 720p, 1080i, 1080p
b Supported PC resolutions (all displayed in 60 Hz progressive scan): 640 × 480 (equivalent to 480p, 4:3), 848 × 480 (equivalent to 480p, 16:9), 1024 × 768, 1280 × 720 (equivalent to 720p), 1280 × 768, 1280 × 1024, 1360 × 768, 1440 × 900, 1680 × 1050, 1920 × 1080 (equivalent to 1080p)
c When YP_{B}P_{R} connection is used HD-DVDs and streamed 1080p video will not be output at 1080p, but will be downscaled to 1080i or lower, while DVDs will not be upscaled, only deinterlaced (480p maximum).
d With the 2010 cable refresh, the composite-out capabilities were removed from the Component HD A/V Cable.

=== HD DVD Player ===
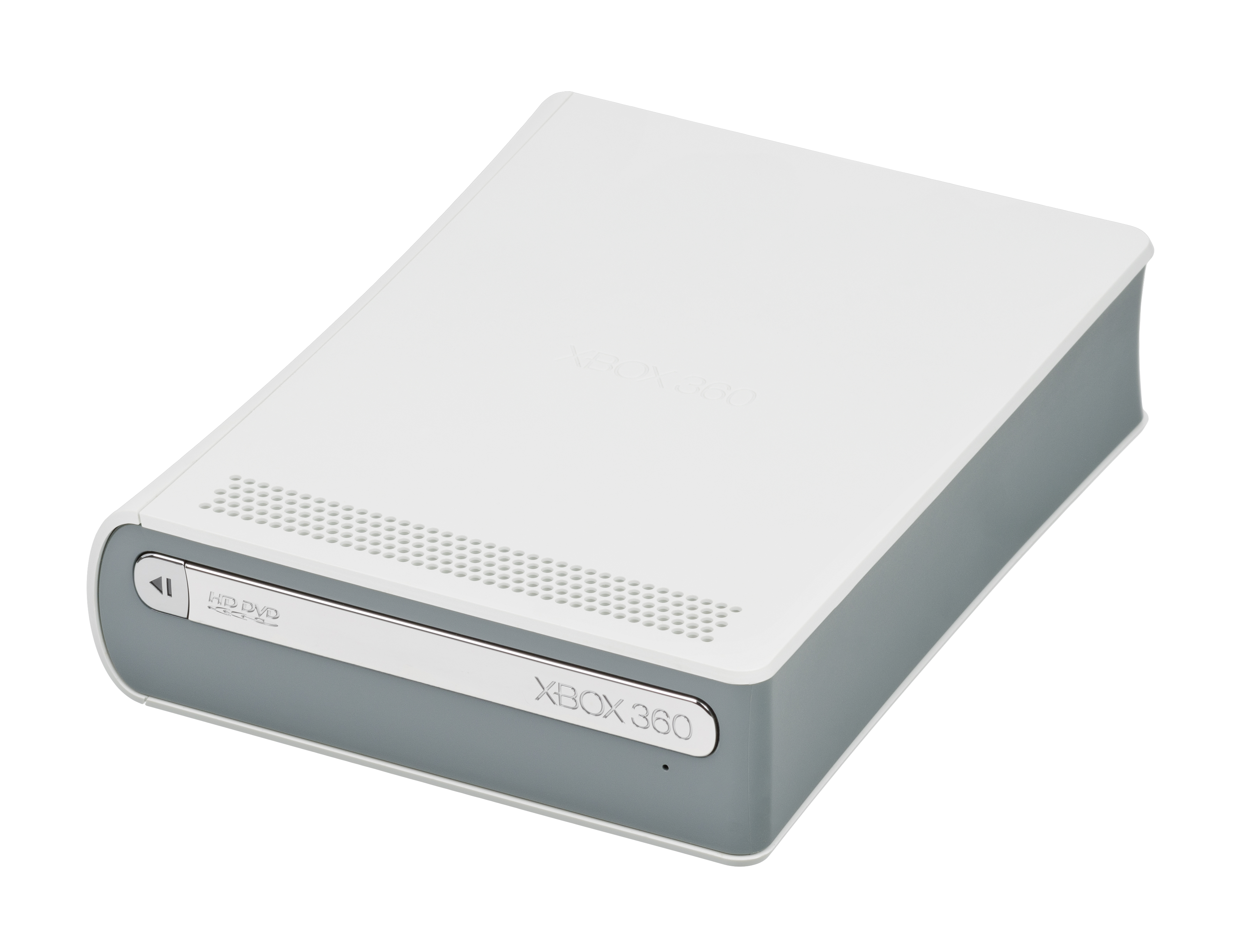
Xbox 360 HD DVD Player

The Xbox 360 HD DVD Player is a discontinued accessory which allows playback of HD DVDs. It was announced by Bill Gates during his 2006 keynote speech at CES. It was officially presented at E3 2006 and was launched on November 7, 2006.

The drive uses USB to connect to the Xbox 360 which processes and outputs the audio and video. The HD DVD player also features two extra USB ports on the rear, a Universal Media Remote, as well as a clip for attaching the wireless network adapter. The drive cannot be used to play Xbox or Xbox 360 game titles, and all Xbox 360 games continue to use DVD-9 media.

=== Headsets ===
==== Wired Headset ====
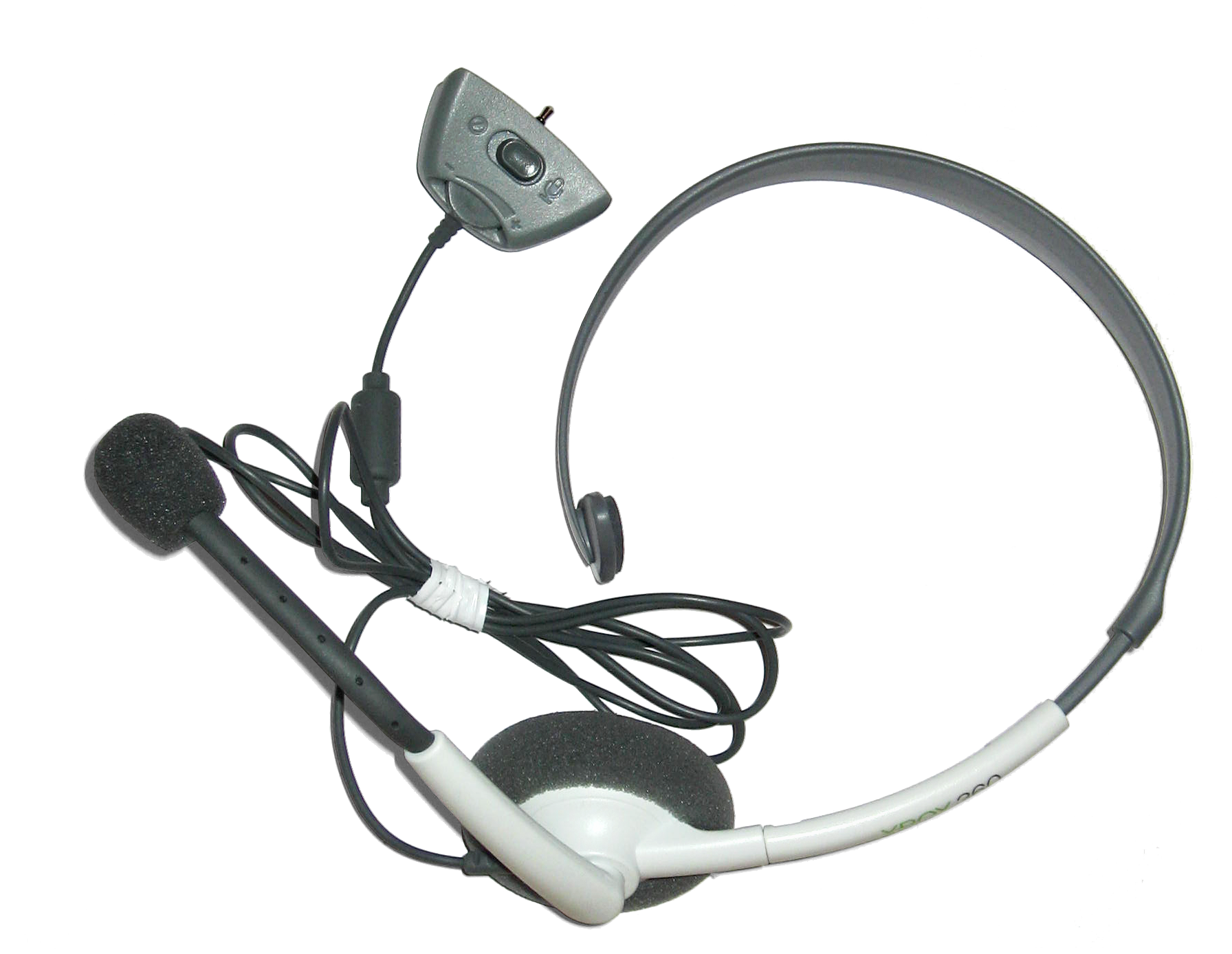
Wired headset (version 1, white)

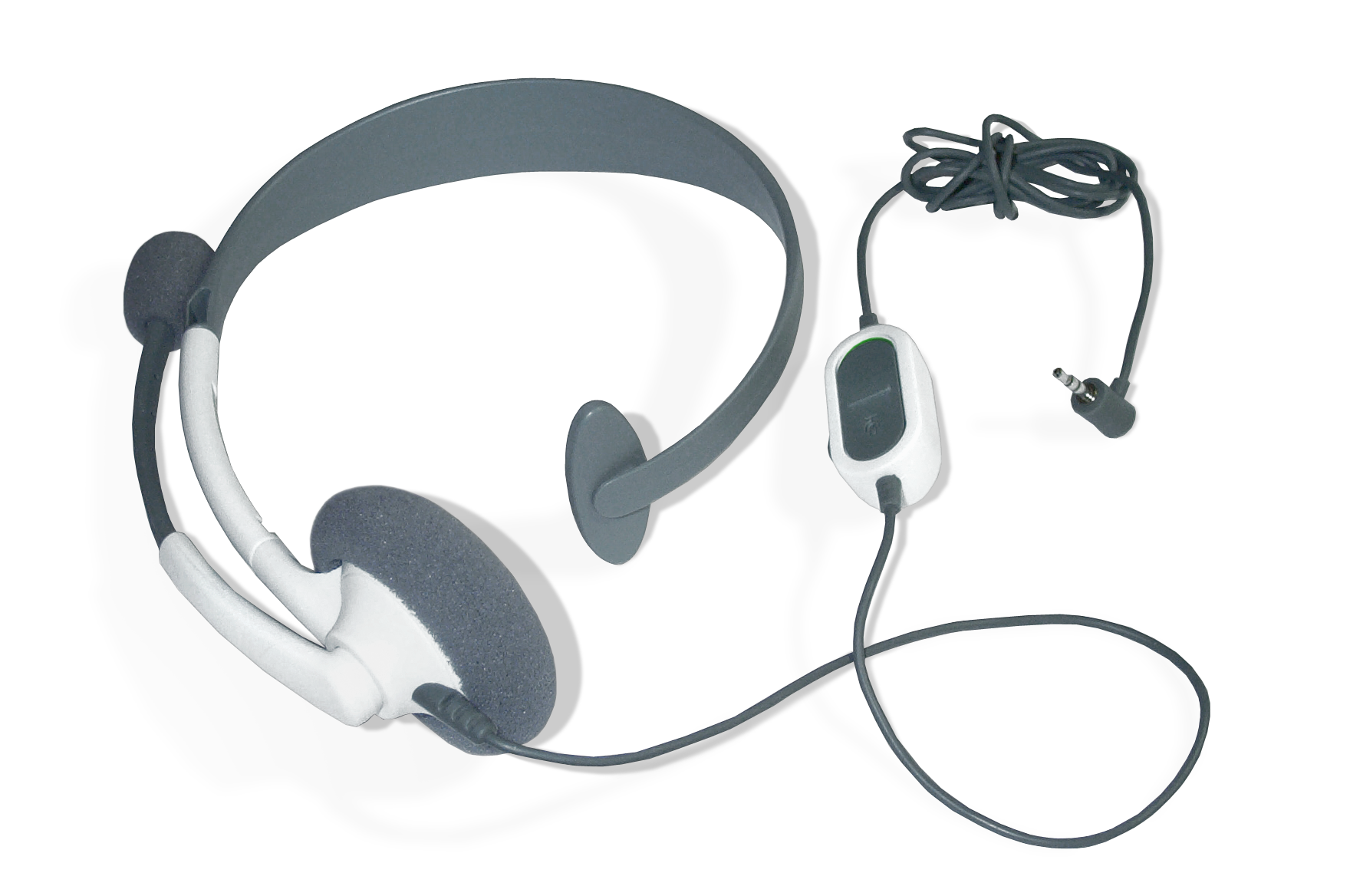
Wired headset (version 2, white)

The Xbox 360 Wired Headset allows gamers to use in-game voice chat, private chat, party chat, voice for video chat and in-game voice recognition in games such as Tom Clancy's EndWar. The headset can also be used with a PC but requires a controller to do so. It features an in-line volume control and a mute switch. There are two versions of the headset, which feature differently shaped connectors. This was to allow compatibility with the Chatpad keyboard accessory (the original version will not fit on the Chatpad). The foam elements on the headset are prone to fading over time. A dark grey headset would soon turn into a light grey one. A wired headset is bundled with every console other than Core/Arcade models, as well as with the messenger kit and the Xbox Live Starter Pack. In addition to the first party headset, Plantronics produces a range of officially licensed wired headsets for the Xbox 360. Additionally, many standard mobile phone hands-free kits which feature 2.5 mm connectors will also function as headsets, although this is not officially supported. Similarly, the Xbox headset can be used in many devices that support 2.5 mm headsets.

==== Wireless Headset ====
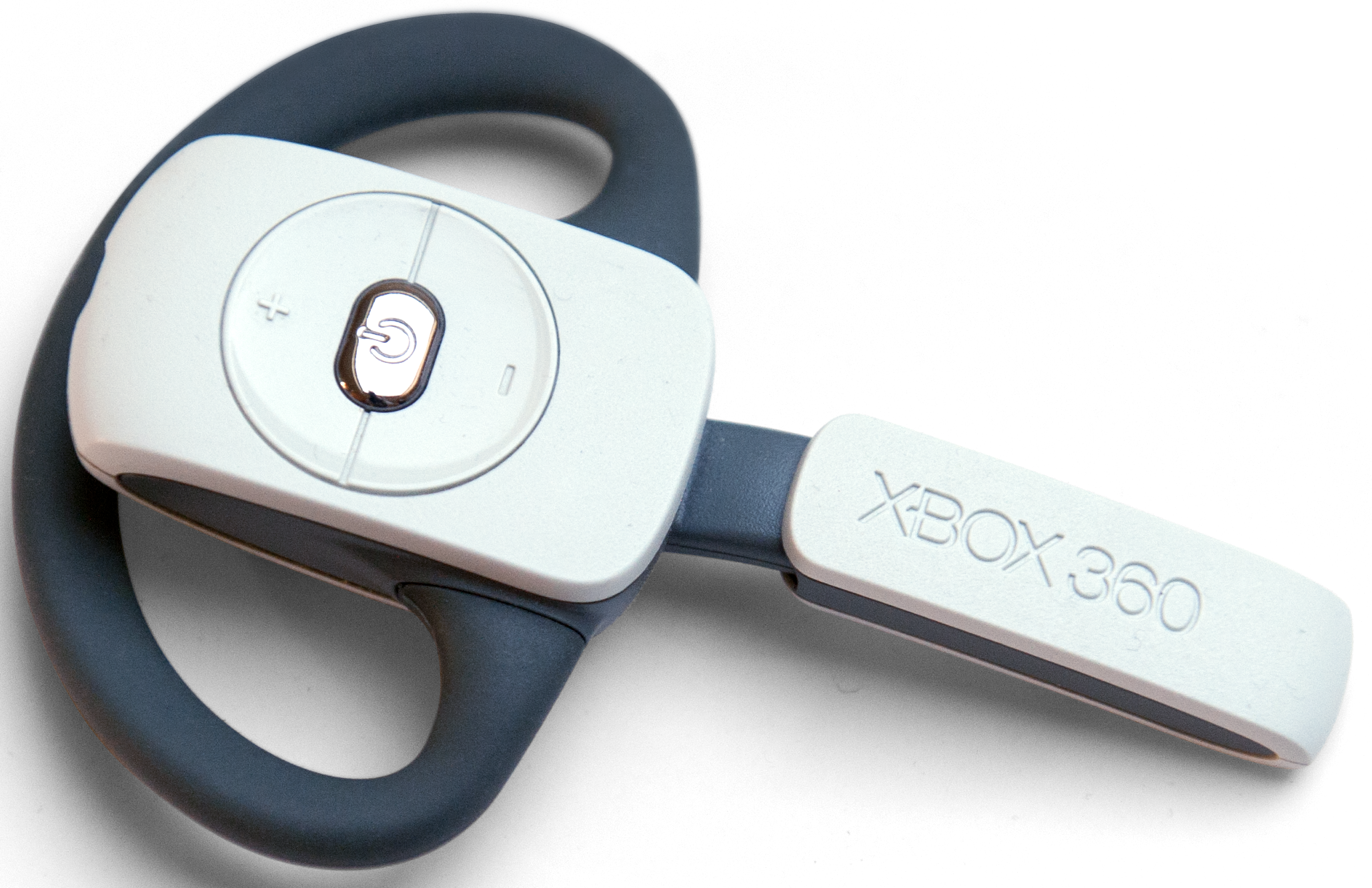
Wireless headset

The Xbox 360 Wireless Headset performs the same task as the wired headset, but connects using the same 2.4 GHz wifi technology as the wireless controller, rather than by a physical connector, allowing it to function within a 30 ft/9 m range (approx) and can be used with or without a controller connected to the console. Up to four wireless headsets can be used simultaneously on a single Xbox 360. The headset features a built-in rechargeable battery, which lasts up to 8 hours, and comes with a USB charger and an instruction manual. The headset fits over either ear and comes with two sizes of removable ear grips for a better fit.

==== Wireless Headset with Bluetooth ====
In late 2011, Microsoft replaced the Wireless Headset with a completely redesigned model, which is glossy black, designed to more closely resemble Xbox 360 S consoles, and also capable of connection to Bluetooth devices such as mobile phones and computers.

=== Live Vision camera ===
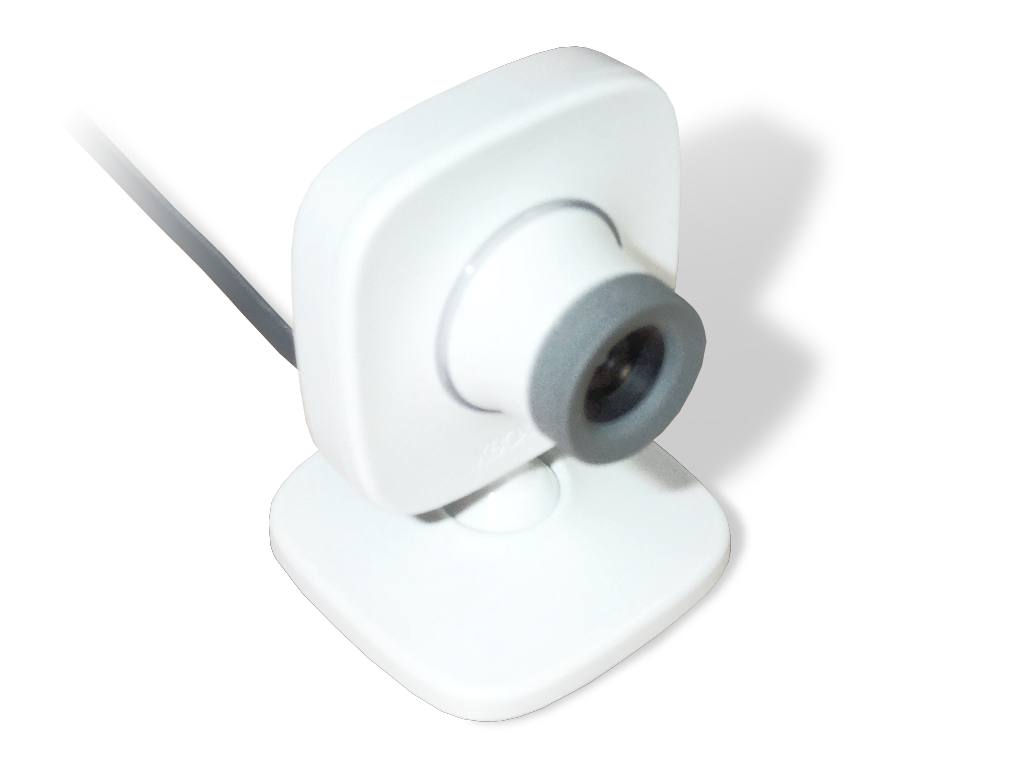
Xbox Live Vision Camera

The Xbox Live Vision camera was announced at E3 2006 and was released in North America on September 19, 2006, and Europe and Asia on October 2, 2006 (November 2, 2006, in Japan). There are many games which have camera functionality included, some of which are: Uno, TotemBall, Burnout Paradise (only during online play, when you are taken down and the camera sends a picture of you at the moment of being taken down), Texas Hold'em, Spyglass Board Games, Pinball FX, Hardwood Backgammon, Hardwood Hearts and Hardwood Spades. For a full list see main article. The ability to create an in-game representation of a player is possible using this camera and a suitable game, similar to Sony's EyeToy for the PlayStation 2 and PlayStation Eye for the PlayStation 3. The retail games Tom Clancy's Rainbow Six: Vegas and Vegas 2 allow players to create an in-game version of their face with this feature. The dashboard software released on June 13, 2006, added an option in the system tab to support its functions. Users with the Fall 2010 dashboard update will be able to use the Live Vision camera to video chat with users of the Kinect as well as start video conferences with Windows Live Messenger users.

The Xbox Live Vision Camera is also used in Viva Pinata: Trouble in Paradise, and You're in the Movies.

== Storage ==
=== Detachable hard drives ===
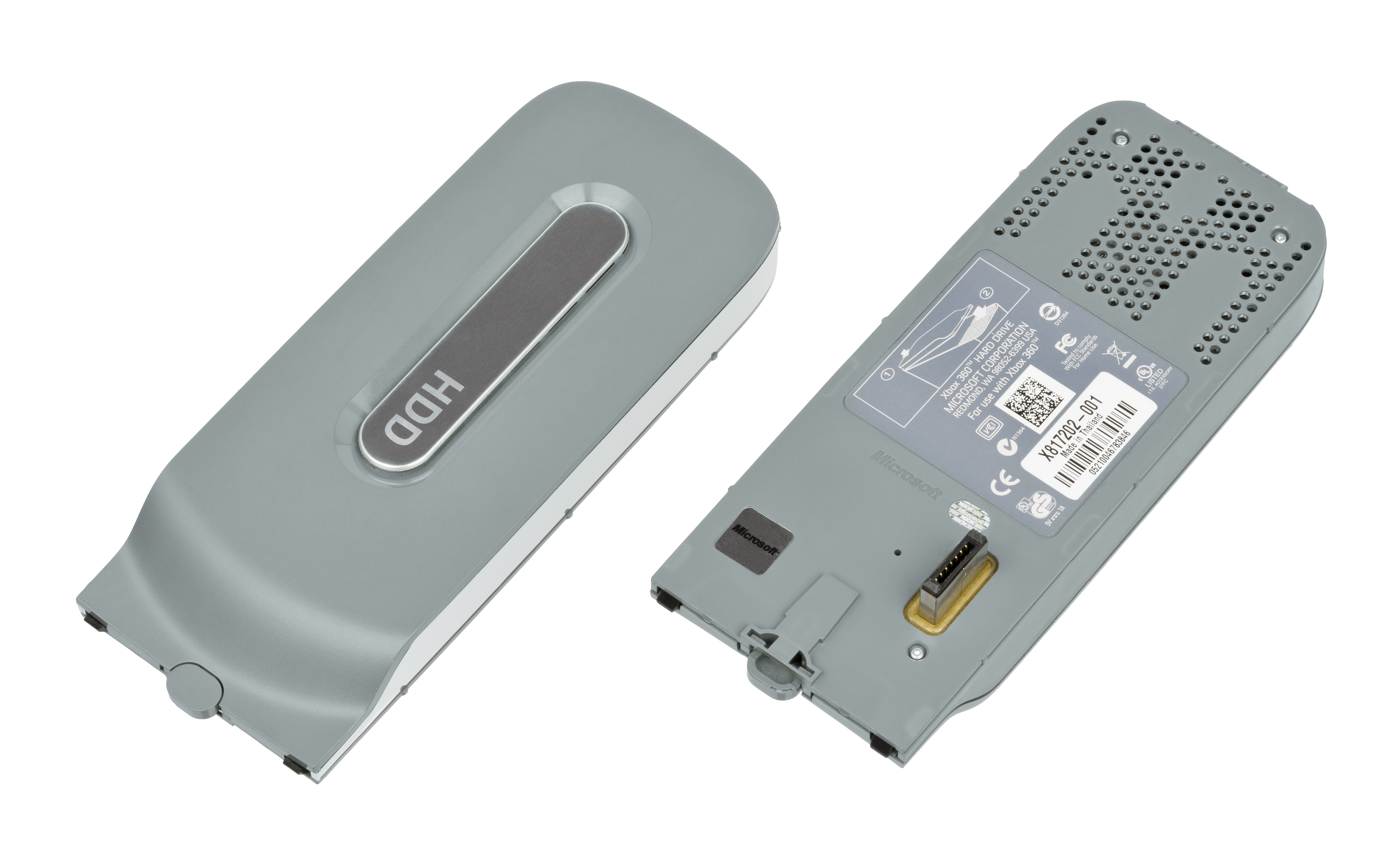
Top and bottom of an original style detachable hard drive

Optional detachable SATA hard drives are used for the storage of games, music, downloaded trailers, levels, demos, player preferences, and community-created content from Xbox Live Marketplace. It may also be used to transfer such content between Xbox 360 units. It is required to play original Xbox games and a select number of Xbox 360 games. The total capacity of the Xbox 360 hard drive is either 20 GB, 60 GB, 120 GB, 250 GB, 320 GB, or 500 GB.

Initially, 250 GB hard drives were only available through third-party manufacturers or through the purchase of a special-edition Xbox 360 console bundle, but from 2010, it was being sold as a separate accessory in Japan, North America, and the UK. Currently, the 320 GB hard drive is only available as part of either limited/special edition Xbox 360 S bundles or as a separate purchase for Xbox 360 S consoles; it is not available for original Xbox 360 models. Of the total storage capacity, approximately 6 GB is reserved for system use; around 4 GB of that portion is reserved for game title caching and other hard drive-specific elements in games that support the hard drive and an additional 2 GB is reserved for use by the Xbox 360 backwards-compatibility software. This leaves users with approximately 14, 54, 114, 244, or 314 GB (displayed as 14, 52, 107, 228, or 292 GiB) of free space on the drive. Depending on the market, the hard drive comes preloaded with content, such as videos and Xbox Live Arcade games or demos.

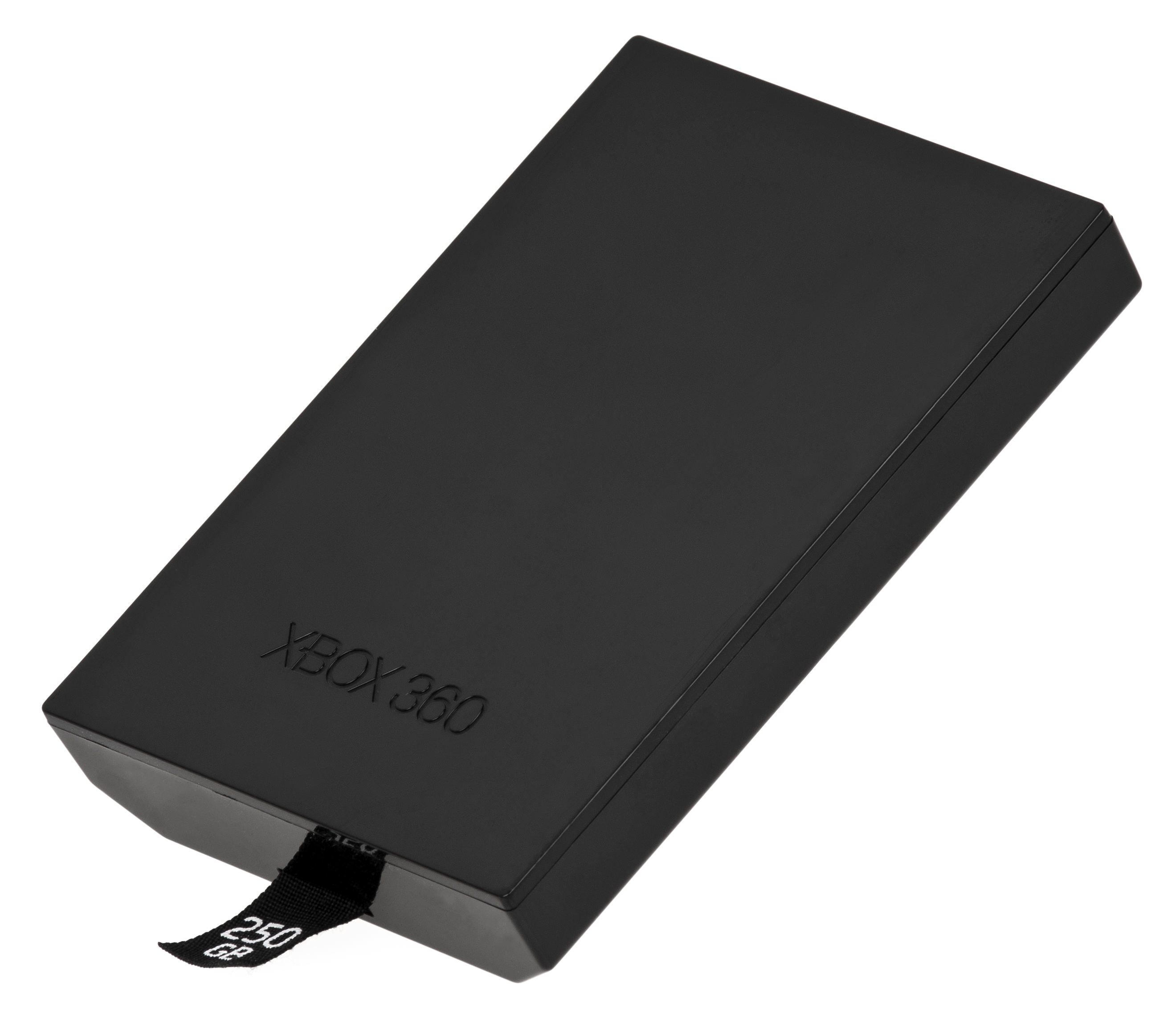
250 GB Xbox 360 S style hard drive

Hard drives designed for the original models of Xbox 360 are not directly compatible with Xbox 360 S models and vice versa. However, if removed from its case, the 2.5-inch SATA hard drive within older model HDD units may be inserted into the Xbox 360 S hard drive slot and will function normally. On August 20, 2010, Microsoft announced a 250 GB stand-alone hard drive for use with Xbox 360 S models priced at US$129.99 The actual drives inside their respective casings are standard 2.5" (laptop-size) SATA hard disk drives loaded with special firmware. However, the Microsoft versions are notably more expensive than standard drives.

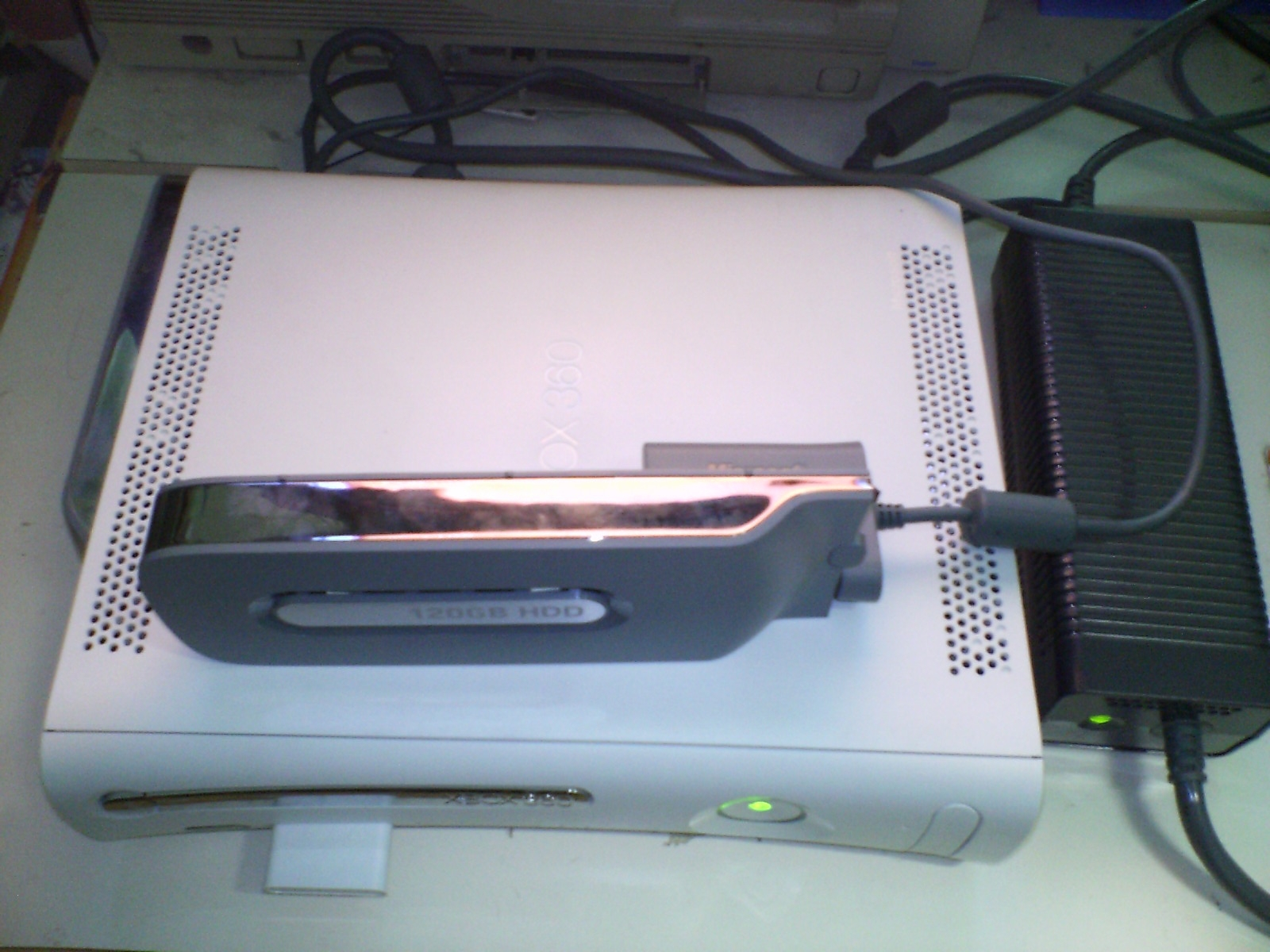
Data transfer cable connected to a 120 GB HDD

=== Memory units ===
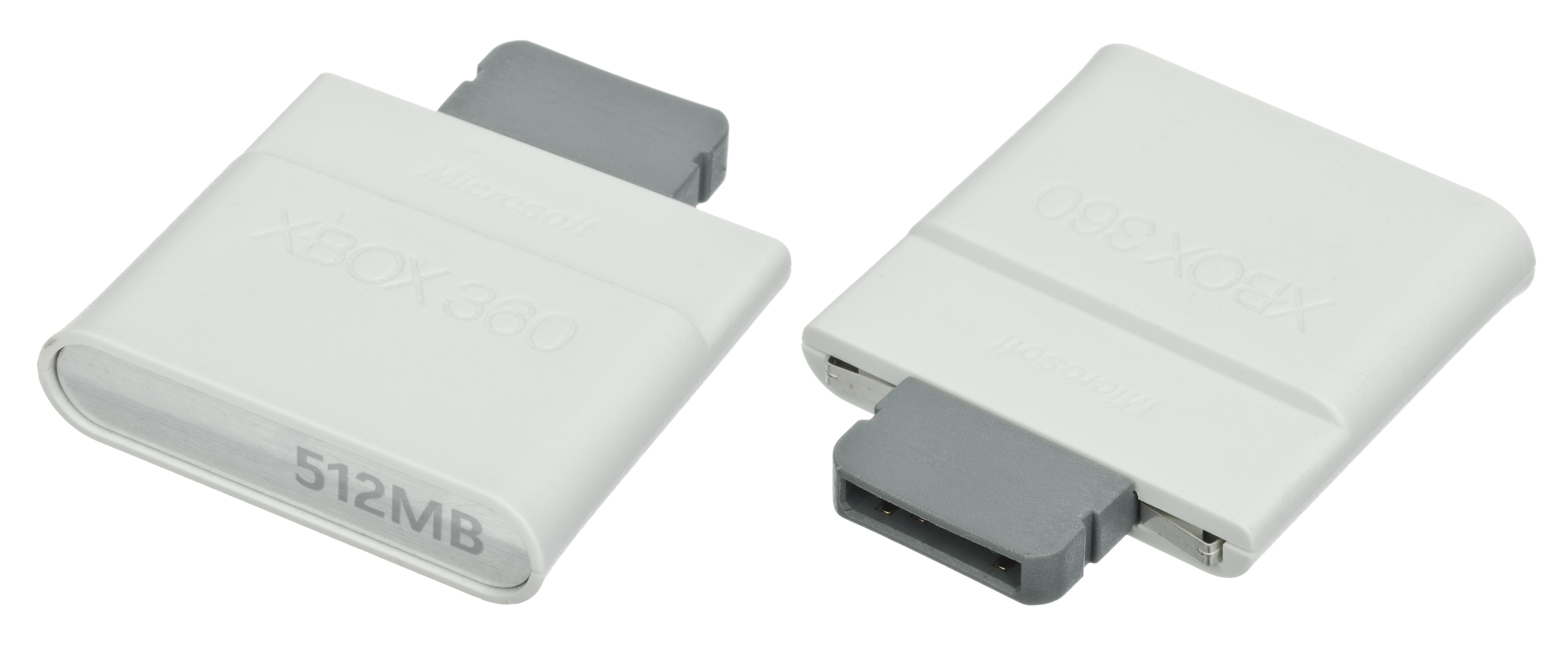
The 512 MB memory card seen from above (left) and below (right)

Small, portable, flash-based memory devices allow the transfer of saved games, unique gamer profiles, and content downloaded from Xbox Live Marketplace to other Xbox 360 consoles. They were discontinued upon the release of the redesigned Xbox 360 S, which had no memory card slots. Sizes available were:

- 64 MB memory card
- 256 MB memory card (Supplied only with Xbox 360 Arcade models prior to December 2008.)
- 512 MB memory card (Was pre-loaded with the Xbox Live Arcade game Geometry Wars: Retro Evolved for a limited time. Later units were pre-loaded with the Xbox Live Arcade game Worms. Still later units came with a keychain carry case.)

Some game saves and downloaded content cannot be copied from hard drives to memory cards. What content cannot be moved is up to the discretion of the individual video game developers.

Example games with unmovable content:

Game	un-movable	movable
Call of Duty 3	Saved game	—N/a
Call of Duty: Modern Warfare 2	Multi-player (split-screen / system link) saved game	Single-player (campaign) saved game
Bejeweled 2	Saved game	—N/a
Dead or Alive 4	Saved game	—N/a
Dead or Alive Xtreme 2	Saved game	—N/a
Forza Motorsport 2	Local scoreboard data	Saved game, ghosts, settings, photos, vinyl groups and replay
Forza Motorsport 3	Saved game	ghosts, settings, photos, vinyl groups and replay
Perfect Dark Zero	Saved game (from the Xbox 360 Dashboard)	Saved game (from the in-game options) and downloaded content
Ridge Racer 6	Downloaded content	Saved game
Rock Band 2	Saved game	—N/a
The Last Remnant	Saved game	—N/a
Viva Piñata	Saved game and most other data	—N/a
Zuma	Saved game	—N/a

=== Datel Xsata ===
The Datel Xsata is an unlicensed accessory that sits between the 360's drive and the console itself and is used to transfer materials from the console's hard drive to a Windows PC. Use of this device to transfer saved game files for the purpose of unlocking achievements is prohibited by Microsoft in the Xbox Live Terms of Service agreement.

The Xsata can also be used to modify a player's avatar using software such as Modio or other freeware that can be found on the internet.

FATXplorer can also be used in conjunction with the Xsata for file transfer.

=== Datel Data Transfer Kit ===
Datel's Transfer Kit for Xbox 360 allows users to transfer data from their Xbox 360 memory cards to a PC.

=== USB storage devices ===
The Xbox 360 can read USB storage devices such as thumb drives, Zunes, iPods (except iPod Touch and iPhone), MP3 players, PSPs, and hard drives, however an Optional Media Update is required to play music and other files from certain music players, this is available from the Xbox Live Marketplace. The devices which have been previously mentioned can be used to play music, or to view pictures and videos. FAT, FAT32 and HFS+ file systems are supported, but NTFS and exFAT are not.

On March 26, 2010, Microsoft announced a system update allowing the use of standard USB flash drives to store game profiles, saves, demos, and other Xbox 360 content would be coming on April 6.

According to Major Nelson, any USB flash drive over 1 GB can be configured for use, with up to 16 GB per device and two devices per system. He also announced that Microsoft will be partnering with SanDisk to create Xbox 360 branded USB flash drives that will come pre-configured for use right out of the box. With the Fall 2012 Dashboard update, released on October 16, 2012, the flash drive size limit has been increased to 32 GB. A Dashboard update on April 30, 2015, increased the storage limit to 2 TB.

== Cooling products ==
=== Nyko Intercooler 360 ===
The Nyko Intercooler 360 is designed to reduce the internal operating temperature of the 360 and as a result, to prolong lifespan of the console. It connects to the exterior of the Xbox 360. There is no internal modification of the Xbox 360 required. A pass through power connection utilizes the existing Xbox 360 power supply, negating the need for an extra AC adapter. The unit also powers on and off automatically with the system and the Intercooler's small size fit in tight spaces like entertainment centers with the 360 placed in either horizontal or vertical orientation.

Many consumers, as well as the press, claim it scorches their consoles, "steals" power from the system, and even causes the red ring of death, which the device may have been used to avoid. However, Nyko later released the Intercooler EX which has a new AC adaptor made of metal and therefore solves the problem with power "stealing", scorching of the console, and the plug falling off.

At E3 2008, Nyko announced a new revised sleeker model of the Intercooler named the Intercooler TS. This new model is smaller than previous models and blends in with the console. Its main feature is called TempSmart, a temperature sensing technology which automatically powers on the Intercooler's fans when needed, and continues to cool the console even after the console has been switched off until a proper ambient temperature has been reached. It is also powered by its own AC adapter, so no batteries or USB cables to the console are necessary.

=== Gamexpert Cooler King (UK) / Pelican Air Flo Cooler (USA) ===
The Cooler King is an external fan for the 360, featuring a 4-port USB hub and AV connections. Official Xbox 360 AV cables cannot be used with the Cooler King as it lacks the AV port usually on the Xbox 360, so players must use third-party Component/Composite cables. This cooler also has VGA support allowing the Xbox 360 to be connected to some monitors and TVs using a VGA cable. This cooler will not work with the newer HDMI-compatible Xbox 360s.

=== Pelican Fan Stand ===
The Pelican Fan Stand provides a different approach to cooling the Xbox 360. Instead of clipping on to the back like the Cooler King or Intercooler, the fan is situated in a base extension that the console can sit on only in the upright position. The placement of the fan allows it to draw cooler air from beneath the console and blow it out through the back. It uses a single USB plug to draw power from the Xbox. This makes a switch necessary to turn off the fan, allowing it to continue cooling after the console has been turned off unlike the Cooler King or the current Intercooler.

== Other accessories ==
=== Faceplates ===
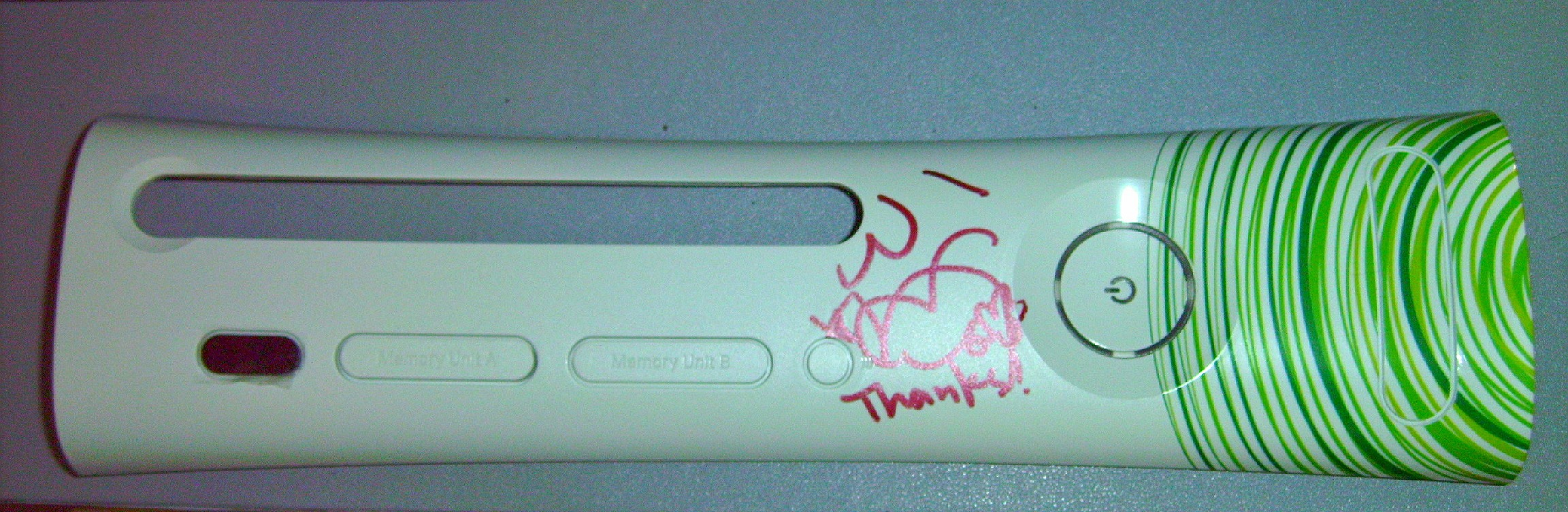
Signed Xbox 360 Faceplate

The default faceplate (black or white) can be replaced with a range of custom designs. The prices of these custom designs are typically around $20. Microsoft distributed three promotional faceplates, one for those present at the Electronic Entertainment Expo 2005 unveiling, one for those at the Zero Hour Xbox 360 launch event, and one for VIP X05 attendees. While faceplates mostly exist for aesthetic reasons they also direct airflow, deter dust and particles, and protect the disc tray and memory slots. Final Fantasy XIII Xbox 360 Elite consoles come with an additional faceplate with Final Fantasy XIII based artwork. Faceplates are not compatible with Xbox 360 S or E consoles.

=== Controller faceplates ===
Xbox 360 controller faceplates can be removed and replaced with a range of custom designs, each of which are sold separately. Red Octane has a range of official alternative faceplates for various Guitar Hero controllers and various third-party companies such as Mad Catz make unofficial faceplates for the standard Xbox 360 controller.

=== Custom cases ===
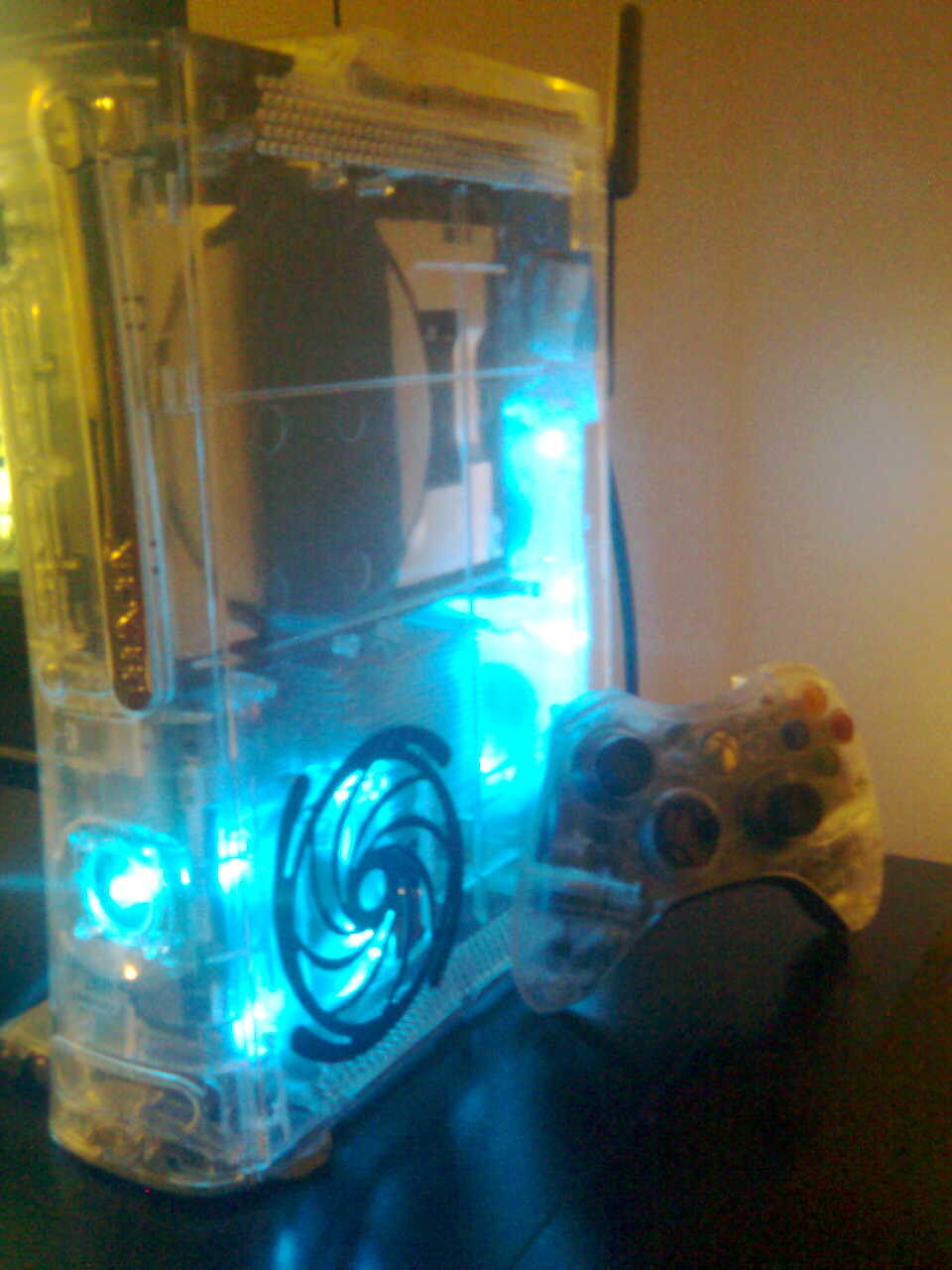
A modified Xbox 360 in a crystal clear case with blue LED

Many unofficial custom cases can be purchased from independent manufacturers and are available in a wide range of colors and styles. The original outer casing of the console may be removed using special tools often provided with custom cases but also sold separately, allowing said case to be fitted. Custom cases are generally based on moulds of official cases but with all Microsoft branding removed. As such, they do not change the size or shape of the console, only the aesthetics. Custom cases are not endorsed by Microsoft, and removing the official case will void any warranty on the console.

Companies which manufacture such cases include Talismoon, Lian Li, XCM and XSPC.

Custom cases are not limited to the consoles themselves as several companies also manufacture custom Xbox 360 controller shells and hard drive shells to match their console counterparts.

=== Wireless network adapter ===
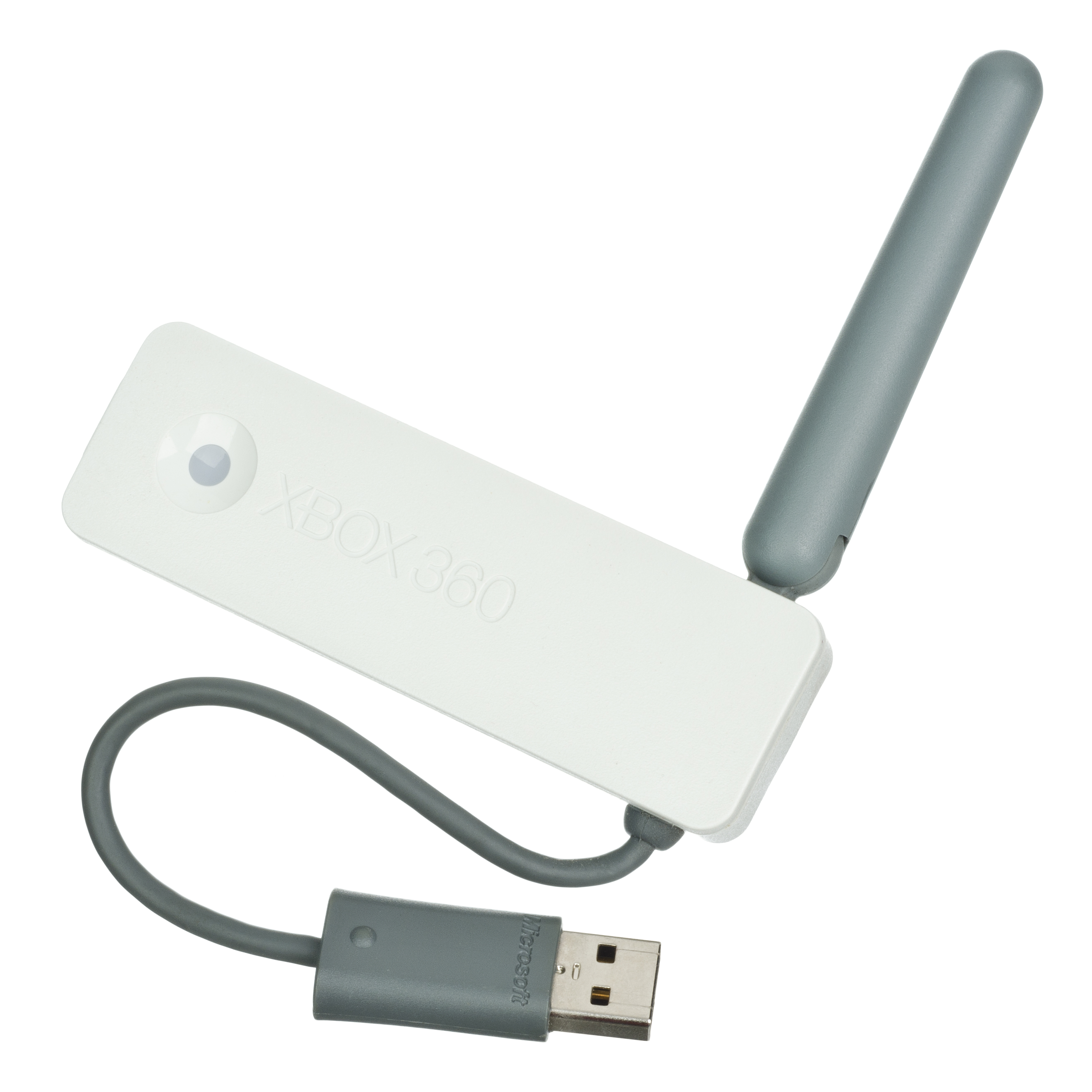
Xbox 360 Wireless Network Adapter (802.11g)

Two official Wi-Fi adapters are available for the Xbox 360, both of which connect through a USB port. The first version released supports 802.11a, 802.11b and 802.11g connections, features a single antenna and is only available in white. On October 5, 2009, Gamestop revealed a new version of the wireless networking adapter which features support for 802.11n networks in addition to those supported by its predecessor. This version features two antennas to ensure adequate 802.11n connectivity, and is only available in black. Encryption mechanisms available when using both versions were initially limited to WEP and WPA, with WPA2 support added on October 28, 2009, via a system software update.

In addition to the official Wi-Fi adapters, third-party wireless bridges may also be used with the Xbox 360. These are connected through the Ethernet port and recognized by the Xbox 360 as a wired connection, but offer the same or similar functionality. It is also possible to connect an Xbox 360 to internet through another system's connection by using connection sharing systems.

Using an official Wi-Fi adapter or third-party wireless bridge, the console can automatically detect and link up with other Xbox 360 consoles that are within range and form an ad hoc network.

In revised "slim" models of the Xbox 360, 802.11n connectivity is integrated into the console. However, the integrated adapter is only able to connect to 2.4 GHz networks, so the first-party adapter or a third party bridge is still required to connect to 5 GHz networks.

=== Exergaming ===
Two exergaming accessories have been designed for the Xbox 360, Dance Dance Revolution Universe and Gamercize, are currently available. Through backward compatibility the Yourself!Fitness instructional game for the Xbox can also be used. Since then, the more versatile official Kinect accessory has been used.
