= TotemBall =

2006 video game

Totemball
- Developer(s): Strange Flavour
- Publisher(s): Microsoft Game Studios
- Platform(s): Xbox 360 (XBLA)
- Release: October 4, 2006
- Genre(s): Action Musical
- Mode(s): Single player, multiplayer

Totemball is an Xbox Live Arcade musical action game developed by Freeverse Software/Strange Flavour and published by Microsoft Game Studios. It takes advantage of the Xbox Live Vision Camera with the camera tracking the players hand movements. It was released on October 4, 2006 as a free download. It does require the camera to play.

== Compatibility ==
Unlike other Xbox Live Vision titles, Totemball is not compatible with the Kinect and can only be played with the original Xbox Live Vision camera, because it was released before the Kinect existed.

TotemBall received "mixed or poor" reviews from critics according to Metacritic with a current score of 44/100.

== See also ==
- Xbox Live Arcade
- Xbox Live Vision
