= Spyglass Board Games =

2007 video game

- Developers: Strange Flavour, Freeverse
- Publisher: Freeverse Software
- Platform: Xbox 360 (XBLA)
- Release: August 1, 2007
- Genre: Board games
- Modes: Single player, Multiplayer

Spyglass Board Games is a video game developed by independent software developers Freeverse Software and Strange Flavour for the Xbox 360's Xbox Live Arcade service. It is a compilation of board games Chess, Checkers, Mancala, and Reversi.

The title supports the Xbox Live Vision camera.

== Reception ==
Spyglass Board Games received mixed reviews from critics. On Metacritic, the game holds a score of 54/100 based on 10 reviews.

Alex Navarro of GameSpot gave the game 5/10, praising its amount of content for the low cost (400 Microsoft Points) and option to play multiplayer, but complained about "how shoddy everything feels, from the game options, to the presentation, to the online implementation." David Craddock of IGN was similarly critical of the game, giving it 4.5/10 and calling out the game's lack of playable tutorials (especially for Mancala and Reversi) and the Xbox Live Vision camera support as being "tacked on."

== See also ==
- Xbox Live Arcade
- Xbox Live Vision
