= You're in the Movies =

2008 video game

- PAL region cover art for Xbox 360
- Developer: Zoë Mode
- Publisher: Codemasters
- Composer: Richard Jacques
- Platform: Xbox 360
- Release: NA: November 18, 2008; EU: November 28, 2008; AU: March 26, 2009; JP: April 16, 2009
- Genre: Party
- Modes: Single-player, multiplayer

You're in the Movies is a party video game for Xbox 360, developed by Zoë Mode and published by Codemasters in North America and the PAL territories in 2008, and in Australia and Japan in 2009. Players perform actions such as applying make-up, jogging in place, driving a car and playing volleyball, which are filmed using the Xbox Live Vision camera and assembled into a movie. The game includes 30 movie scenarios that can involve up to four people. Previous video can be stored on the console and sent to friends via e-mail. The game was met with mixed reviews, receiving criticism for the bundled camera.

== Gameplay ==
You're in the Movies uses the bundled Xbox Live Vision camera. Players must complete mini-games by mimicking actions that will appear in a movie trailer, in the context of various science fiction, thriller, and adventure stories. Scores are awarded based on how closely each player manages to mimic the action required. Afterwards, players have to do a series of pick-up shots by assuming various facial expressions for the camera, such as an evil grin or a look of intense concentration. Videos can be shared to people in different households via links sent by Xbox through email.

== Development ==
Zoë Mode, who had previous experience with camera games, conceived the idea of You're in the Movies from the virtual green screen technology they had used in their previous games. They thought a movie game would be a "perfect fit" for this technology. Andy Trowers, the lead designer of the game, stated the following:

This is obviously something that hasn't been done before, so there are a lot of challenges getting the technology working and in terms of the game design as well. You've got to make games that are fun. At the same time, you've always got to have one eye keeping an eye on the movie side as well, ensuring that you have fun games that give you the actions that you need for the movies. So that was really challenging, but a really enjoyable aspect of the development. There were two main things: the segmentation technology and the creative aspect of it--coming out with things that are fun, coming up with enough variety. We've got loads of genres in there, from horror movies to sci-fi movies. Coming up with all of those different things and coming up with the games as well, making the two things kind of intermix, so keeping an eye on that, the management of that, and making sure everything worked was a challenge.

Initially, the developers filmed one movie and designed games that would fit the characters' actions as a proof-of-concept. The movie themes and mini-games were conceived by the creative design team, who wanted to evoke a B-movie atmosphere. Trowers noted that designing mini-games was "quite an organic process": "Sometimes we'd have a movie and we'd say OK, we want the player to do this in the scene, which is the action we want, so try to think of a game idea for this. But other times we'd be thinking, "Oh, you know what, we got this great idea for a game and these are the essential actions we can get out of it, how are we going to use it in movies?" So it was really a three-way process, trying to figure out what we could get people to do, what would be fun, how it would fit in the movie—it wasn't just one process of doing it, it had to go both ways". Some movie ideas were left out of the final game.

== Release and promotion ==
The developers originally thought the game's target audience would be adults. Towers noted: "We started out with an idea that the users are going to be fairly old, but then as we sort of made the game we focused it. We realized that lots of different people get fun out of the game in lots of different ways. We tested on young kids, we tested on adults, we tested on a mix of the two, and we came to the conclusion that anyone can play this game. We very much wanted the game to be accessible from the start so that you can play alongside your granny or with your kids. We saw people enjoying it from all ages".

At Microsoft's Press Conference at the E3 2008 conference in July, Shane Kim announced the game, along with Scene it: Box Office Smash. The game feature that allows players to star in trailers for fake movies was showcased in the conference. The movie shown was titled "Cold Blooded" and was about a giant, radioactive salamander. Other gameplay footage was shown during the conference as well. It was shown at the Games Convention one month later.

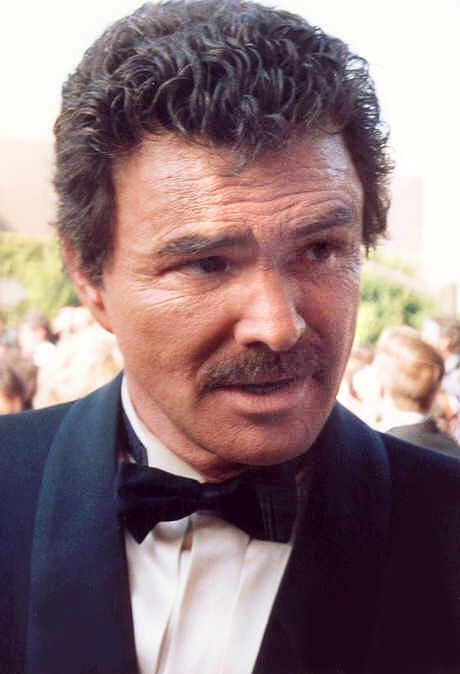
Hollywood star Burt Reynolds fronted a series of TV and magazine advertising spots for the game.

Hollywood star Burt Reynolds fronted a series of TV and magazine advertising spots for the game in 2008. The ads first premiered in North America on VH1 on November 18, and aired in major European markets from November 28.

== Critical reception ==
Reception

Aggregate scores
Aggregator	Score
GameRankings	55.92%
Metacritic	55/100

Review scores
Publication	Score
1Up.com	C+
Edge	6 of 10
Eurogamer	2 of 10
Game Informer	7.25/10
GameSpot	4.5 of 10
IGN	4.2 of 10

You're in the Movies received generally mixed to negative reviews from critics. It currently holds a score of 55.92% on the aggregate gaming review site GameRankings. It also received a 55 out of 100 from Metacritic based on 19 reviews.

Reviewers mainly criticized the game for the bundled Xbox Live Vision Camera. Even before the game's release, EyeToy's Sandy Spangler thought there would be some technical difficulties: "They're using some technical elements that are not reliable, at least not according to our experience. They're using background subtraction to put you in the movie, and it's not very robust, that's why we haven't done it in any of our games".

Nate Ahearn from IGN, who gave the game a 4.2/10, referred to the Vision Camera as "an annoyance" that "handcuffs the entire experience". Nate also criticized the pacing and the activities, which he called "boring", stating: "You're in the Movies is bad, no matter how many beers you’ve consumed throughout the night". Don Francis from GameSpot called it "a box-office bust, despite featuring your own recognizable stars" and also criticized the voice acting which he called "annoying". He concluded: "Despite the pack-in camera, the problems of You're in the Movies drag this would-be game down, making the $60 price tag much too high to justify. There are better party games on the Xbox 360, and less expensive ways to get a Vision Camera". 1UP.com's Tyler Barber, who gave the game a C+, called it more of "a video game, not an acting studio".

Eurogamer's Dan Whitehead was the harshest on the game, which he gave a score of 2/10, stating that "people don't live in movie studios. They live in houses and flats that are lit for comfort, not to fulfil the technical requirements of an ageing webcam. If you really want to put yourself and your friends on the TV, leave this failed experiment on the shelf, and put the money towards a digital camcorder instead".
