= Sidewinder =

Sidewinder may refer to:

== Snakes ==
- Sidewinding, a form of locomotion used by some snakes
  - Bitis peringueyi or sidewinding adder, a venomous adder species found in Namibia and southern Angola
  - Cerastes cerastes or Saharan horned viper, a venomous pit viper found in northern Africa and parts of the Middle East
  - Crotalus cerastes or sidewinder rattlesnake, a venomous pit viper species found in the southwestern United States

== Amusement park rides ==
- Sidewinder (roller coaster element), an inversion involving a half-loop followed by a half-corkscrew
- Sidewinder (Elitch Gardens), a roller coaster in Denver, Colorado
- Sidewinder (Hersheypark), a roller coaster in Hershey, Pennsylvania
- Sidewinder, a ride at Sandcastle Waterworld in Blackpool, England

== Computing ==
- Microsoft SideWinder, a family of digital game controllers
- Sidewinder, firewall software from Secure Computing (now McAfee)

== Fiction ==
- Sidewinder (character), a Marvel supervillain
- Budd (Kill Bill) or Sidewinder, a character in the Kill Bill films
- Sidewinder, a machine in the Thunderbirds TV series
- The nickname of Patience Barton in the 1969 film Support Your Local Gunfighter

== Music ==
- Sidewinder (band), a band from Australia
- Sidewinders, a barbershop quartet
- The Sidewinders, an Arizona rock band
- Sidewinder (EP), a 1996 EP by Download
- The Sidewinder, a 1964 album by Lee Morgan
- "The Sidewinder" (composition), a jazz standard by Lee Morgan
- Holiday Sidewinder, an Australian indie pop singer
- Sidewinder a 2017 EP by Stand Atlantic
- Sidewinder, an electronic music composition and album by Morton Subotnick
- "Sidewinder", a song by Avenged Sevenfold from City of Evil
- "Sidewinder", a song by Catfish and the Bottlemen from The Balcony
- "Sidewinder", a song by The Cynic Project
- "Sidewinder", a song by Lard from Pure Chewing Satisfaction
- "Sidewinder", a song by Photek from Form & Function Vol. 2
- "Sidewinder", a song by Stand Atlantic from Sidewinder EP

== Sports ==
- Sidewinders (X-League), an American football team in Japan
- Tucson Sidewinders, a AAA baseball team
- Sidewinder, a freestyle skateboarding trick
- Sidewinder, a baseball pitcher who throws using a side-arm delivery

== Vehicles ==
- Bell Sidewinder, a clone of the Phantom X1 aircraft
- Dodge Sidewinder, a 1997 concept car
- Kia Sidewinder, a 2006 concept car
- Smyth Sidewinder, a two-seat experimental aircraft developed in 1969
- Shay locomotive, A geared steam locomotive with a driveshaft connecting the side mounted cylinders with gears mounted to the end of the drive axles was often referred to as a sidewinder

== Video games ==
- Sidewinder (Mastertronic video game), a 1988 video game for the Amiga
- Sidewinder (video game) or Mission Cobra, a 1989 action arcade game for NES

== Other uses ==
- AIM-9 Sidewinder, an air-to-air missile
- A mini-revolver manufactured by North American Arms
- Sidewinder (slot car), a type of model car with a transverse motor
- Operation Sidewinder (disambiguation)
- Sidewinder, and its redesign, Sidewinder 2, a range of manual closed-circuit rebreathers produced by KISS

== See also ==
- "The Sidewinder Sleeps Tonite", a song by R.E.M.
