= Before the Storm =

Before the Storm may refer to:

- Before the Storm (2000 film), a 2000 Swedish film Före stormen directed by Reza Parsa
- Ill Wind (film) or Before the Storm, a 2007 French film
- Before the Storm: Barry Goldwater and the Unmaking of the American Consensus, a 2001 political history book by Rick Perlstein
- Life Is Strange: Before the Storm, a 2017 episodic video game and a prequel to Life Is Strange

== Literature ==
- Before the Storm (Fontane novel), an 1878 novel by Theodor Fontane
- Before the Storm (Kube-McDowell novel), a 1996 novel by Michael P. Kube-McDowell in the Star Wars: Black Fleet Crisis trilogy

== Music ==
- Before the Storm (Darude album), 2000
- B4 the Storm, a 2020 album by Internet Money
- Before the Storm (Jack Savoretti album), 2012
- Before the Storm (Samson album), 1982
- Before the Storm (mixtape), a 2010 mixtape by Tinchy Strider
- "Before the Storm", a song by Firewind from Allegiance, 2006
- "Before the Storm", a song by Jonas Brothers and Miley Cyrus from Lines, Vines and Trying Times, 2009
- "Before the Storm", a song by Queensrÿche from The Warning, 1984

== See also ==
- After the Storm (disambiguation)
