= Xbox 360 controller =

Primary game controller for the Xbox 360

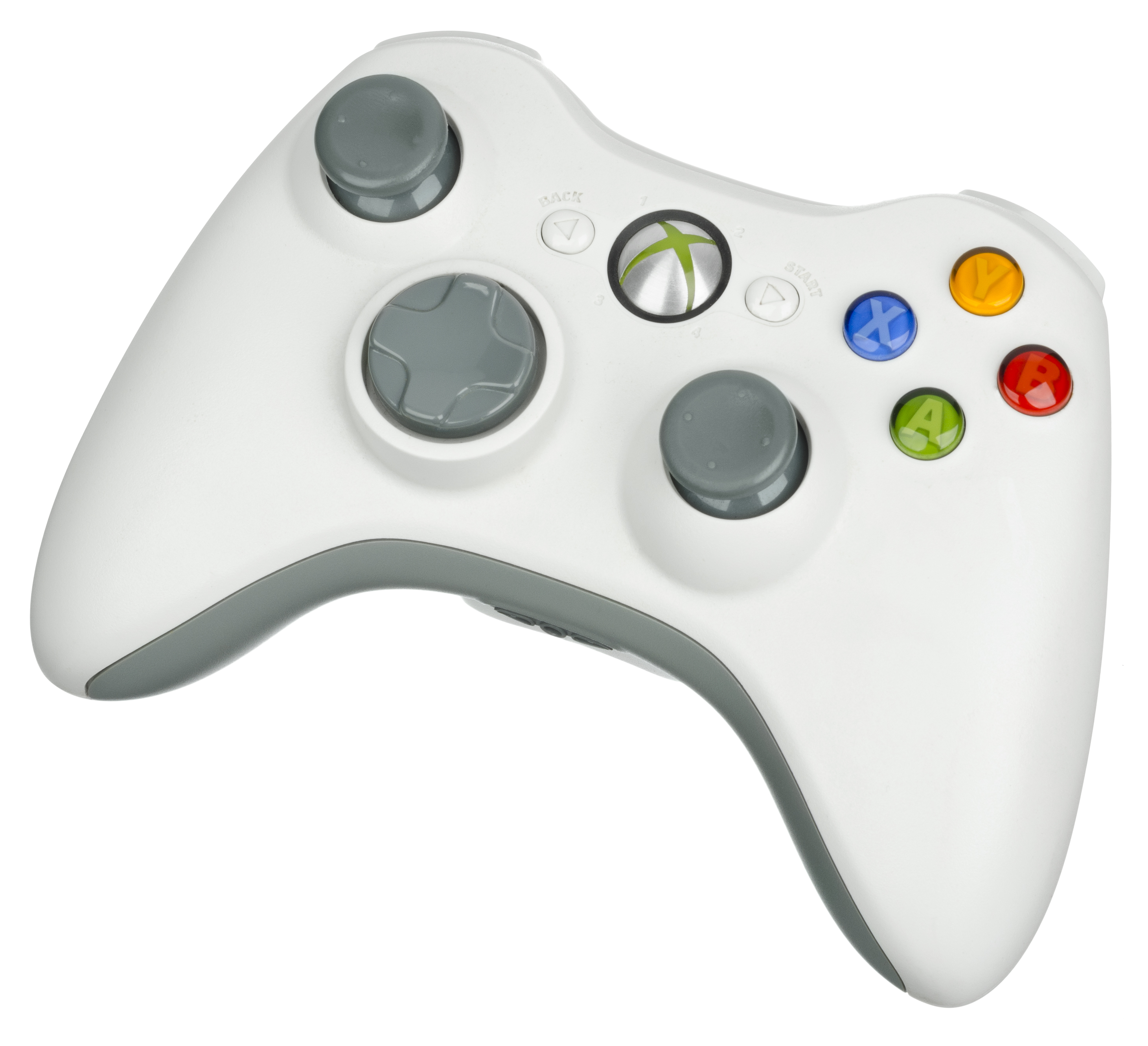
- A wireless white Xbox 360 controller
- Manufacturer: Microsoft
- Type: Gamepad
- Generation: Seventh
- Released: November 22, 2005: NA: November 22, 2005; EU: December 2, 2005; JP: December 10, 2005; MEX/COL: February 2, 2006; KOR: February 24, 2006; HKG/SGP/TWN: March 16, 2006; AU: March 23, 2006; CHL: July 7, 2006; IND: September 25, 2006; ZAF: September 29, 2006; CZE/POL: November 3, 2006; BRA: December 1, 2006; RU: February 10, 2007; PER: February 26, 2008; ARE: October 28, 2008; SYC: Spring 2010
- Input: 2 × clickable analog sticks; 2 × analog triggers; 2 × shoulder buttons; 4 × action buttons; 3 × other buttons (wireless); Digital D-pad
- Connectivity: Wireless (proprietary 2.4 GHz protocol), USB, 2.5 mm headset jack
- Power: Nickel-metal hydride battery; 2 × AA; USB host powered
- Dimensions: Wireless version: 154 mm × 105 mm × 61.3 mm (6.06 in × 4.13 in × 2.41 in); Wired version: 152 mm × 107 mm × 54.0 mm (5.98 in × 4.21 in × 2.13 in) (cable 3.0 m, 9 ft 10 in)
- Weight: Wireless version (with batteries): 265 g (9.35 oz); Wired version: 300 g (10.6 oz)
- Predecessor: Xbox controller
- Successor: Xbox Wireless Controller

The Xbox 360 controller is the primary game controller for Microsoft's Xbox 360 home video game console that was introduced at E3 2005. The Xbox 360 controller comes in both wired and wireless versions. The Xbox controller is not compatible with the Xbox 360. The wired and wireless versions are also compatible with Microsoft PC operating systems from Windows XP onward.

The wireless controllers run on either AA batteries or a rechargeable battery pack. The wired controllers may be connected to any of the USB ports on the console, or to an attached USB hub.

For the Xbox 360's 17th anniversary, the controller was re-released by Hyperkin, a third party studio, for the Xbox Series X and S.

== Design ==
The Xbox 360 controller has the same basic button layout as the Controller S, except that a few of the auxiliary buttons have been moved. The "back" and "start" buttons have been moved to a more central position on the face of the controller, and the "white" and "black" buttons have been removed and replaced with two new bumpers that are positioned over the analog triggers on the back of the controller. The controller has a 2.5 mm TRS connector on the front, allowing users to connect a headset for voice communication. It also features a proprietary serial connector (which is split into 2 parts on either side of the headset connector) for use with additional accessories, such as the chatpad.

On August 31, 2010, Microsoft's Larry Hryb (a.k.a. Major Nelson) revealed a new design of the Xbox 360 controller set to replace the Wireless controller bundled with the Play & Charge Kit. Among small changes such as the shape of the analog stick tops and grey-colored face buttons, the new controller features an adjustable directional pad which can be changed between a disc type D-pad or a plus shaped D-pad. The control pad was released in North America exclusively with Play & Charge Kits on November 9, 2010, and was released in Europe in February 2011.

The Xbox 360 controller provides a standard USB Human interface device software interface, but is designed for the Microsoft XInput interface library. Although many PC video games support the XInput library, some games might not work with this controller.

== Layout ==
A standard Xbox 360 controller features eleven digital buttons, two analog triggers, two analog sticks and a digital D-pad. The right face of the controller features four digital action buttons: a green button, red button, blue button, and yellow button. The lower right houses the right analog stick, in lower left is a digital D-pad and on the left face is the left analog stick. Both analog sticks can also be clicked in to activate a digital button beneath. In the center of the controller face are digital "Start", "Back" and "Guide" buttons. The "Guide" (more commonly known as simply the "Xbox") button is labelled with the Xbox logo, and is used to turn on the console/controller and to access the guide menu. It is also surrounded by the "ring of light", which indicates the controller number, as well as flashing when connecting and to provide notifications. The left and right "shoulders" each feature a digital shoulder button, or "bumper", and an analog trigger.

Wireless controllers also feature an additional "connect" button located between the "bumpers" to facilitate syncing with the console.

Button layout of a wireless Xbox 360 controller

=== Standard colors ===
Wired controllers are available in white (sold separately and bundled with the Core consoles) and black (Xbox 360 S color scheme, along with the limited edition Tron controllers). However, wireless controllers are available in numerous different colors including:

- White controllers were bundled with the Arcade, Pro, and Limited Edition Final Fantasy XIII Elite consoles; also sold separately.
- Black controllers were bundled with the Elite consoles to match the casing; also sold separately (UPC/EAN 0885370145717, 885370239393).
- Dark Blue controllers were released in October 2007 (US only).
- Light Blue controllers were released in October 2007 (Europe and Japan only).
- Pink controllers were released in October 2007.
- Black S and White S controllers are bundled with Xbox 360 S consoles. These differ from their original counterparts in that they are completely one color, rather than with grey accents. The guide button has a mirror like finish, and the analog sticks and D-pad are color matched. The bottom edge of this controller also features a glossy finish to match the Xbox 360 S 250 GB case design. "S" controllers also replace the Microsoft branding above the charging port with an Xbox 360 wordmark.
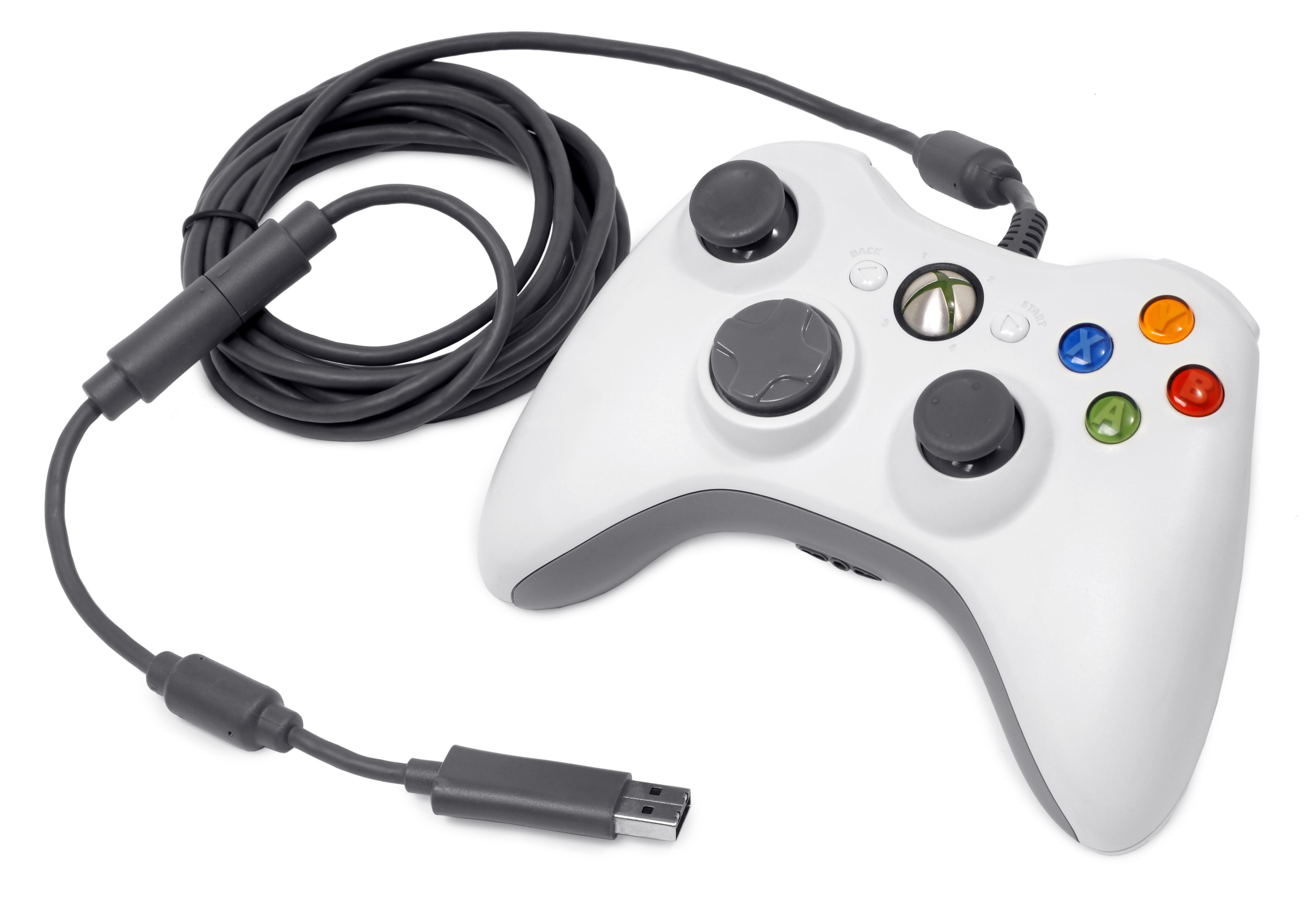
White Xbox 360 Wired controller

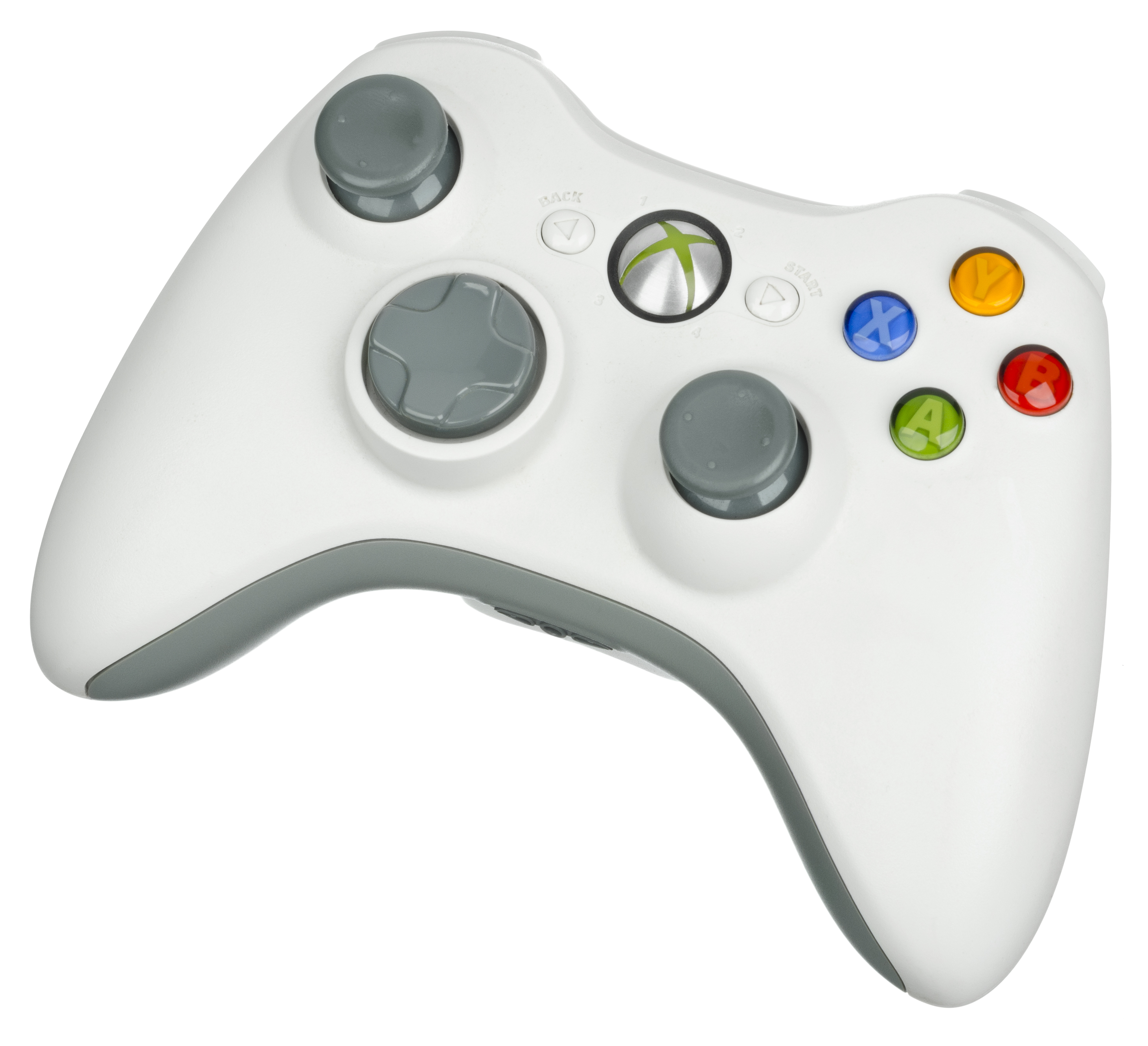
White Xbox 360 Wireless controller

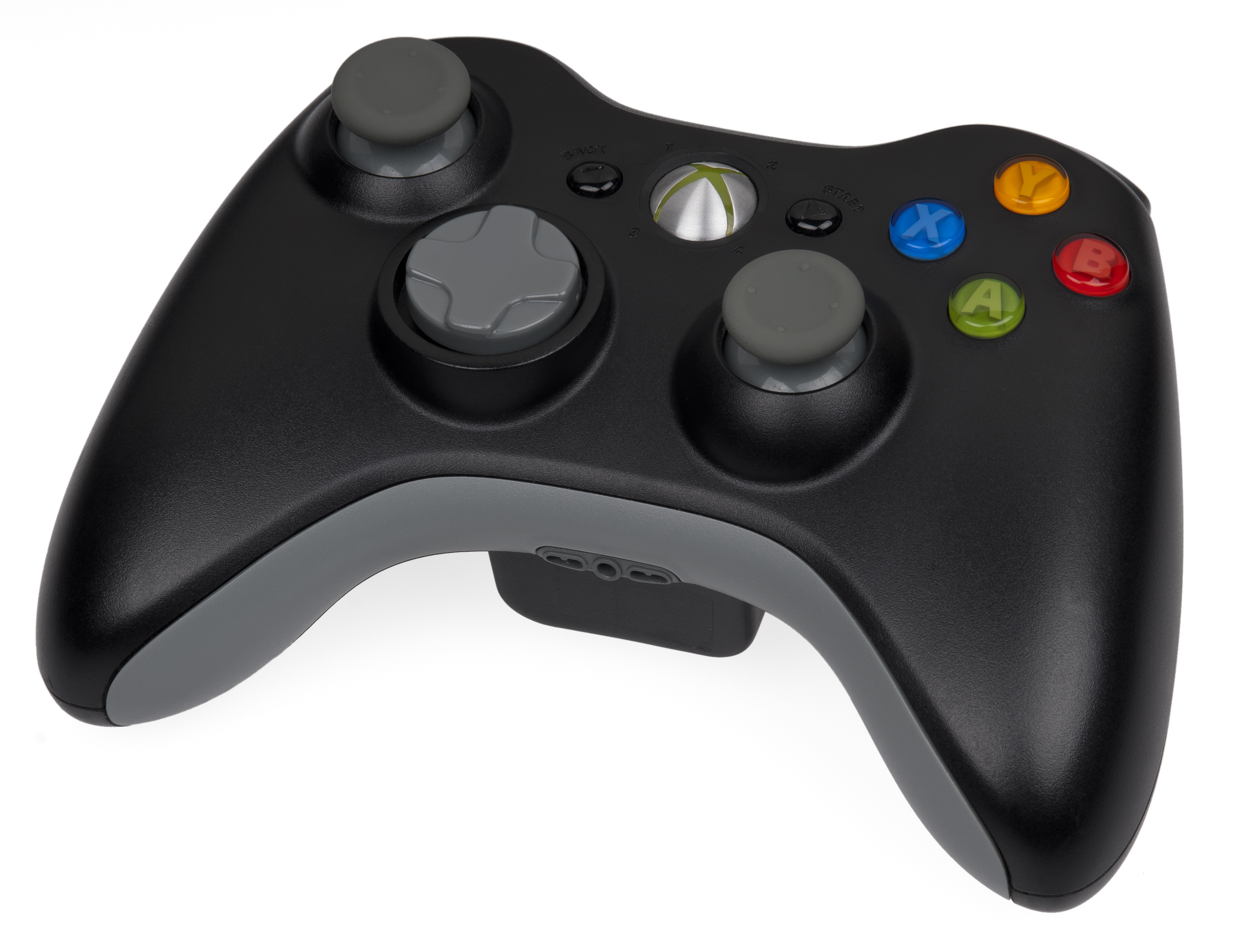
Black Xbox 360 Wireless controller

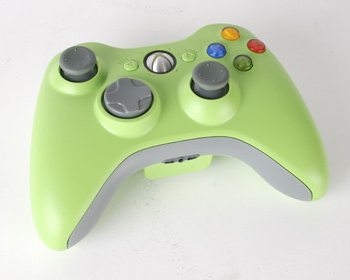
Green Xbox 360 Wireless controller

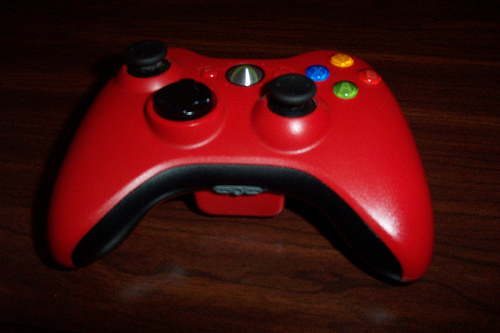
Red Xbox 360 Wireless controller

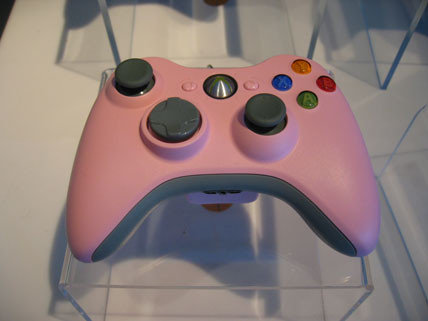
Pink Xbox 360 Wireless controller

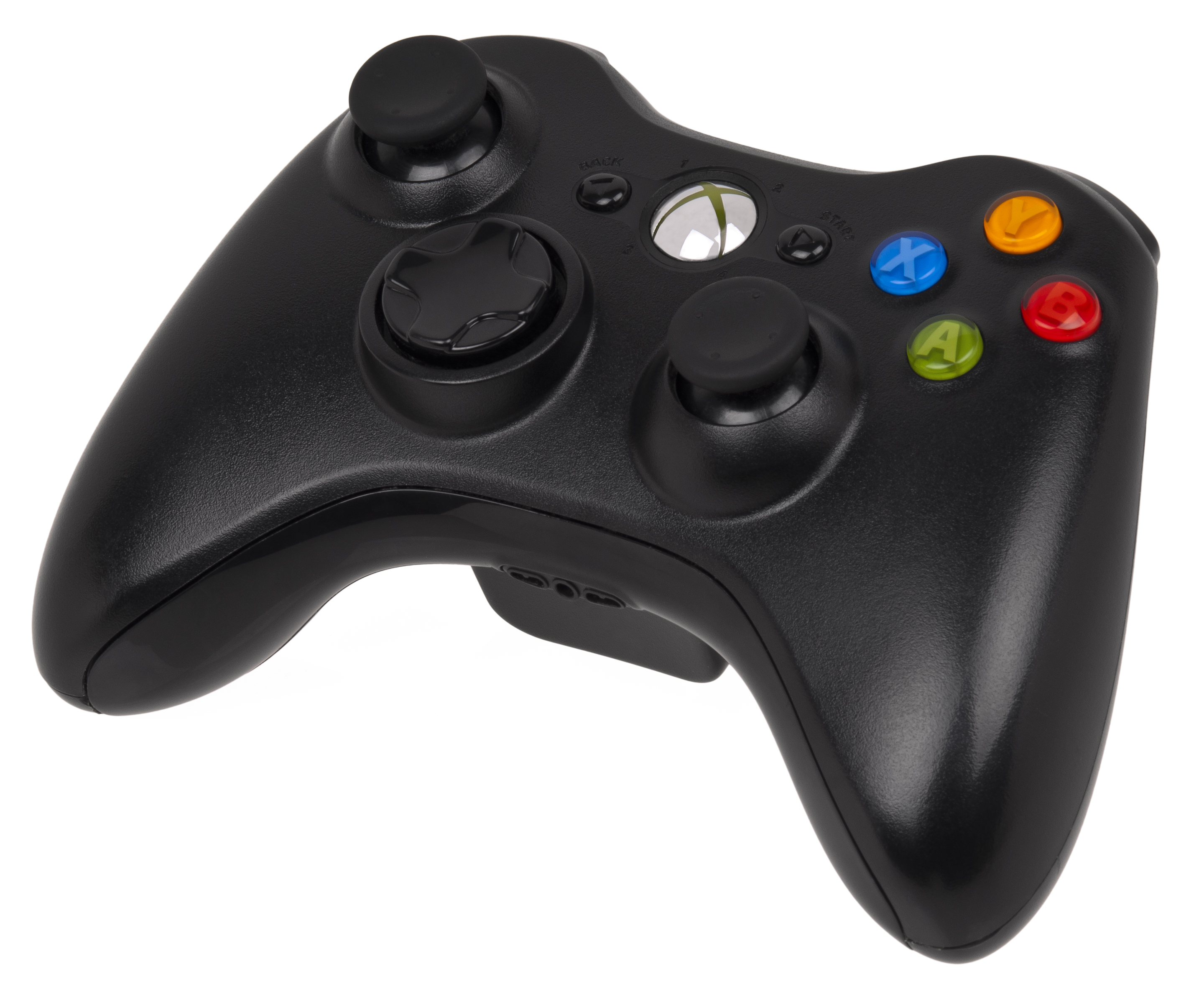
Black Xbox 360 S wireless controller

=== Limited and special edition colors ===
Limited Edition Halo 3 "Spartan" controller

- Halo 3
  - "Spartan Green" controllers were included with the Halo 3 Special Edition Xbox 360 Pro consoles released in September 2007. The controller features 'black accents' with the D-pad, analog sticks, triggers and parts of the casing all changed to black instead to the usual gray.
  - "Limited Edition" "Spartan" and "Brute" controllers were released in September 2007. Two versions were available, each of which feature Halo 3-themed artwork (with either a "Spartan" or "Brute" design) from artist Todd McFarlane. Each version of the controller also included a Master Chief figurine (a different figure was included with each version).
- Red "Limited Edition" controllers were released in September 2008. The controller features 'black accents' with the D-pad, analog sticks, triggers and parts of the casing all changed to black instead of the usual gray. It comes bundled with a Play & Charge Kit with a red rechargeable battery pack. The red controller is also included with the Limited Edition Resident Evil 5 Xbox 360 Elite console released in March 2009.
- Green "Limited Edition" controllers were released in mid-October 2008 in Europe, Asia, and Latin America. The green controller has a D-pad with 16-way functionality, instead of the 8-way D-pad used on all previous controllers. This controller was released alongside Pro Evolution Soccer 2009.
- Dragon Design "Limited Edition" White and Black controllers were released in October 2008 and are available only through Walmart and Sam's Club. The controller features a black dragon (and other symbols) on a white background, along with a white D-pad and black analog sticks. It comes bundled with a black wired headset.

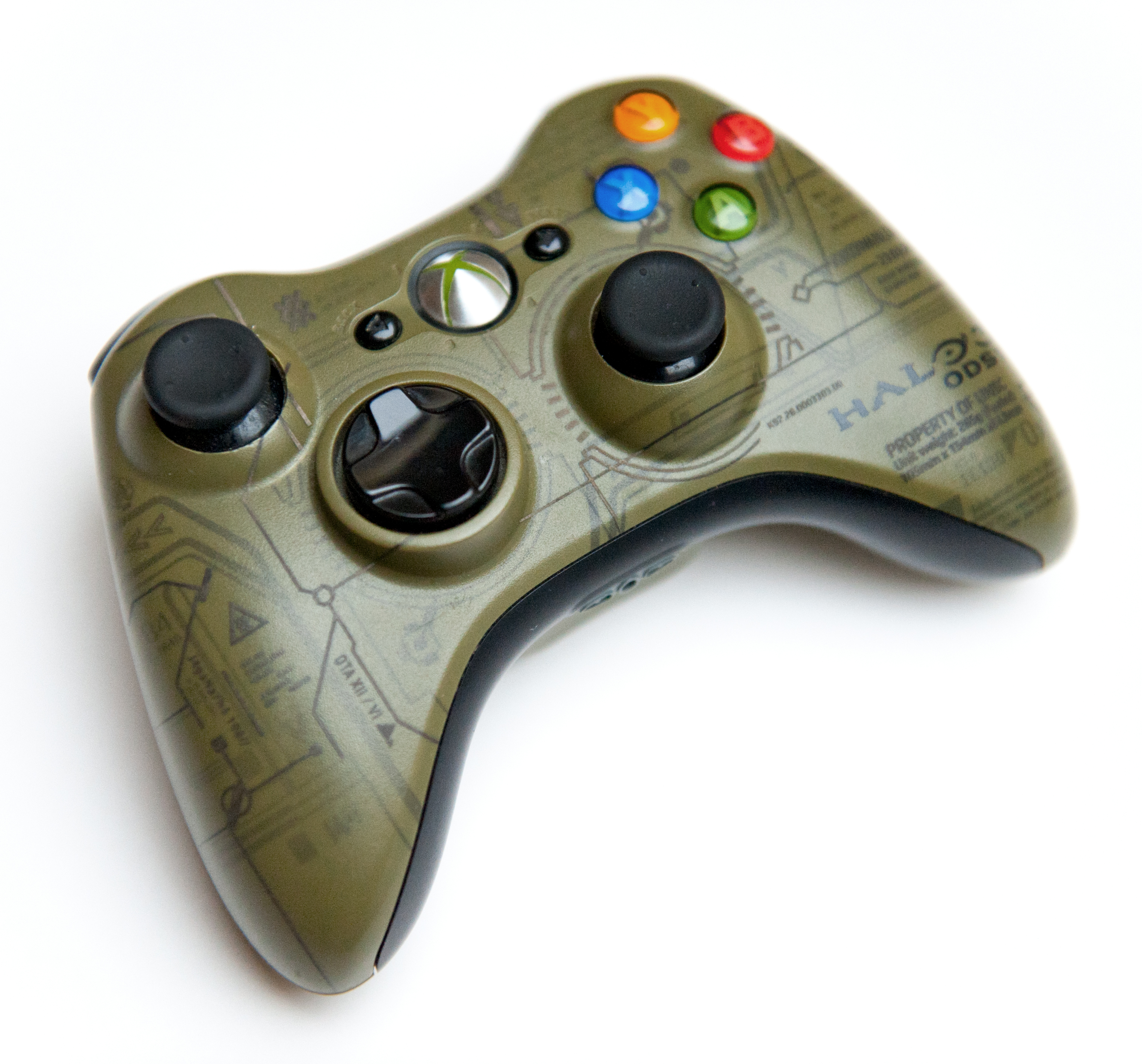
Special Edition Halo 3: ODST controller

- Halo 3: ODST "Special Edition" controllers were released on September 22, 2009 in a "Collector's Pack" including the Halo 3: ODST game. The pack was originally exclusive to GameStop and retailed for US$99.99 in North America.
- Radioactive Design "Exclusive" controllers were released in October 2009 and were available exclusively at GameStop and EB Games Australia. The controller features a carbon black shell with a red radiation symbol emanating from the right analog stick. The left analog stick is black and the right analog stick and D-pad are red. This controller was announced at Major Nelson's website and is said to be limited edition although the packaging makes no reference to this. It comes bundled with a Play & Charge Kit with a black rechargeable battery pack.
- Halo: Reach "Special Edition" controllers were released on September 14, 2010, coinciding with the release of Halo: Reach. The controller is based around the Black S design (black analog sticks, D-pad, etc.; glossy black front; shiny guide button) with the matte black shell replaced with a satin silver shell, which also features a custom design based on the game. It was available separately and with the Halo: Reach Special Edition console bundle, which came bundled with two of the controllers.
- Fable III "Special Edition" controllers were released on October 5, 2010, 3 weeks before the release of Fable III itself. The controller is based around the Black S design (black analog sticks, D-pad etc.; glossy black front; shiny guide button) and features a custom gold-colored shell and artwork. It also comes bundled with an exclusive downloadable tattoo set for use within the game.
- TRON controllers were created by PDP and released in December 2010 to coincide with the film TRON: Legacy. The controllers were offered in two limited edition variations—one with blue LED illumination (20,000 units made) and the other with orange LED illumination (250 units made). Both versions are wired and feature textured grips and a raised, 4-way D-pad.
- Blue "Limited Edition" controllers were released with Limited Edition Blue Xbox 360 consoles and both the console and the controller had turquoise accents and was released on October 7, 2014, exclusively at Walmart for a limited time.

=== Transforming D-pad controllers ===
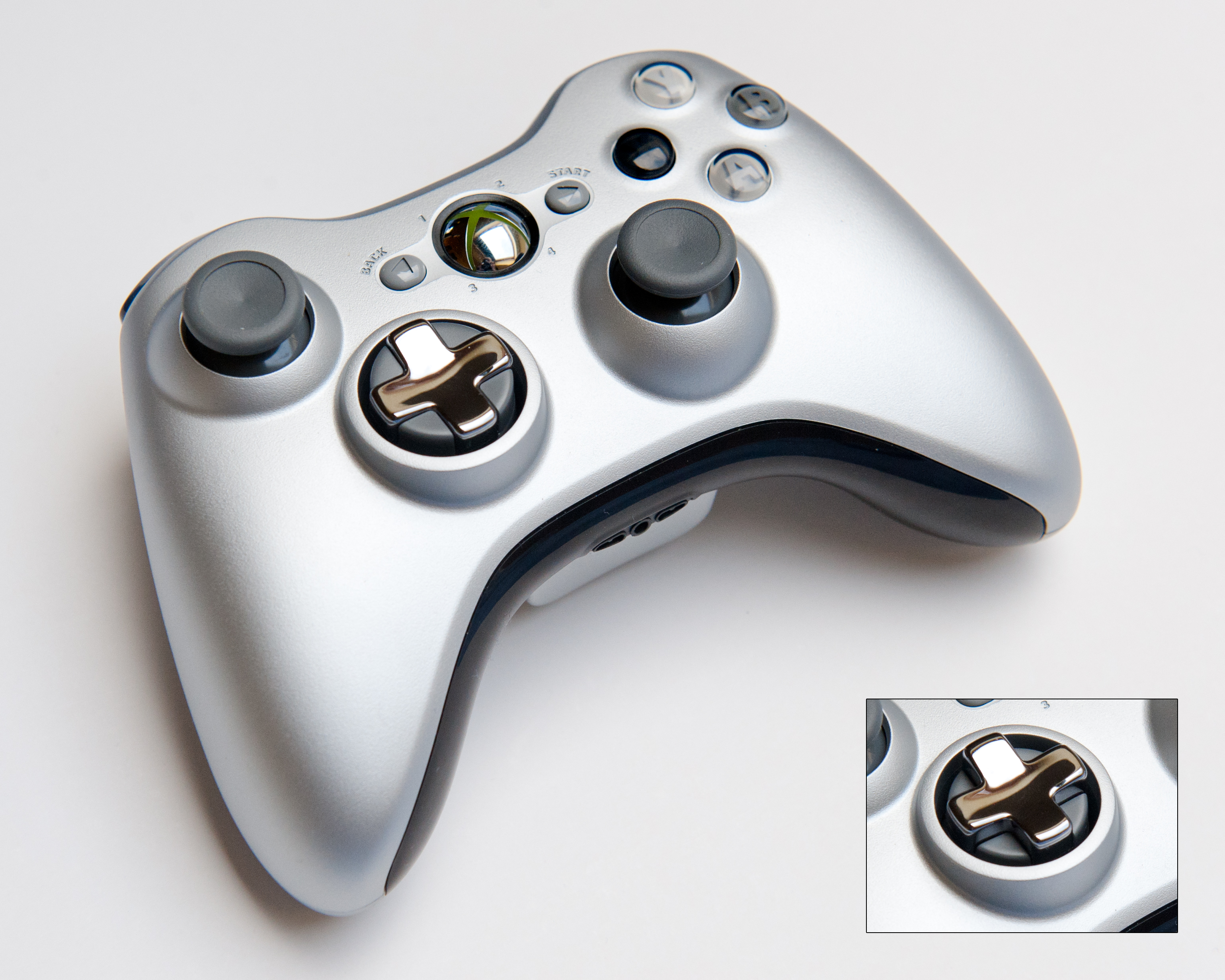
Transforming D-pad special edition controller in "8-way" configuration. The D-pad in "4-way" configuration is shown in the bottom right corner.

- Transforming D-pad "special edition" controllers were released in the US on November 9, 2010, and in Europe during February 2011. The main feature of this controller is a D-pad that can be rotated to adapt to the user's gameplay, becoming either a "plus" (4-way) or a "disc" (8-way) D-pad. The controller also features new concave analog stick tops and grey tone face buttons (A, B, X and Y). The main shell of the controller is matte silver, with glossy black accents (triggers, bumpers and both front and rear panels) like the "Black S" design. This controller comes bundled with a matte black improved Play & Charge Kit with a matte black rechargeable battery pack, offering up to 35 hours of play. The codename for the controller during development was "Aberdeen".
- Gears of War 3 "Limited Collector's Edition" controllers were released on September 20, 2011, to coincide with the launch of Gears of War 3. The controllers are metallic red with a black "Infected Omen" symbol and feature a transforming D-pad. Unlike the "Transforming D-pad" Special Edition controller, the Gears of War 3 LCE controller features the standard colored face buttons and analog stick tops found on other controllers. It was sold with the Gears of War 3 LCE console bundle, which came bundled with two of the controllers.
- Call of Duty: Modern Warfare 3 "Limited Edition" controllers were released on November 8, 2011, to coincide with the release of Call of Duty: Modern Warfare 3. It features custom Modern Warfare 3 artwork (predominantly matte grey), a transforming D-pad and the same concave analog stick tops found on the original transforming D-pad controller. All (non-face) buttons, as well as the analog sticks, are black. It was sold with the Modern Warfare 3 Limited Edition console bundle which came bundled with two of the controllers.
- Star Wars C-3PO "Limited Edition" controllers were released on April 3, 2012 to coincide with the release of Kinect Star Wars. The controller is mirrored gold and black, and features a transforming D-pad, concave analog stick tops and standard colored face buttons. The black panel at the front of the controller also features "wiring" artwork, resembling the parts of C-3PO that are not covered in gold plating in the original Star Wars films. It was bundled the Kinect Star Wars Limited Edition console bundle.
- Chrome Series "Special Edition" controllers were released in May 2012. The chrome series controllers are available in six colors: Blue, Red, Silver, Gold, Black and Purple. These controllers feature a transforming D-pad, concave analog stick tops and standard colored face buttons.
- Black S controllers with a transforming D-pad, concave analog stick tops and standard colored face buttons and bundled with a black improved Play & Charge Kit with a black rechargeable battery pack were released in October 2012.
- Halo 4 "Limited Edition" controllers were released on November 6, 2012. Two different controllers are available:
  - Halo 4 branded "Limited Edition" 'exclusive controllers inspired by the game' were sold with the Halo 4 Limited Edition console bundle; two were included. These feature a transforming D-pad, concave analog stick tops, standard colored face buttons and a glowing blue Xbox guide button instead of the traditional glowing green Xbox guide button.
  - UNSC Halo 4 "Limited Edition" controllers feature the United Nations Space Command (UNSC) emblem on a dark grey translucent case, and also feature a transforming D-pad, concave analog stick tops, standard colored face buttons and a glowing blue Xbox guide button.
- Tomb Raider "Limited Edition" controllers were released on March 5, 2013 to complement the launch of Tomb Raider. They are red and feature a two-layer color finish with laser etching to create a realistic and tactile worn appearance inspired by Lara Croft's climbing axe from the game. These feature a transforming D-pad, concave analog stick tops and standard colored face buttons. The controllers also come bundled with a downloadable token for an Xbox 360-exclusive playable Tomb Raider character.

=== Non-retail colors ===
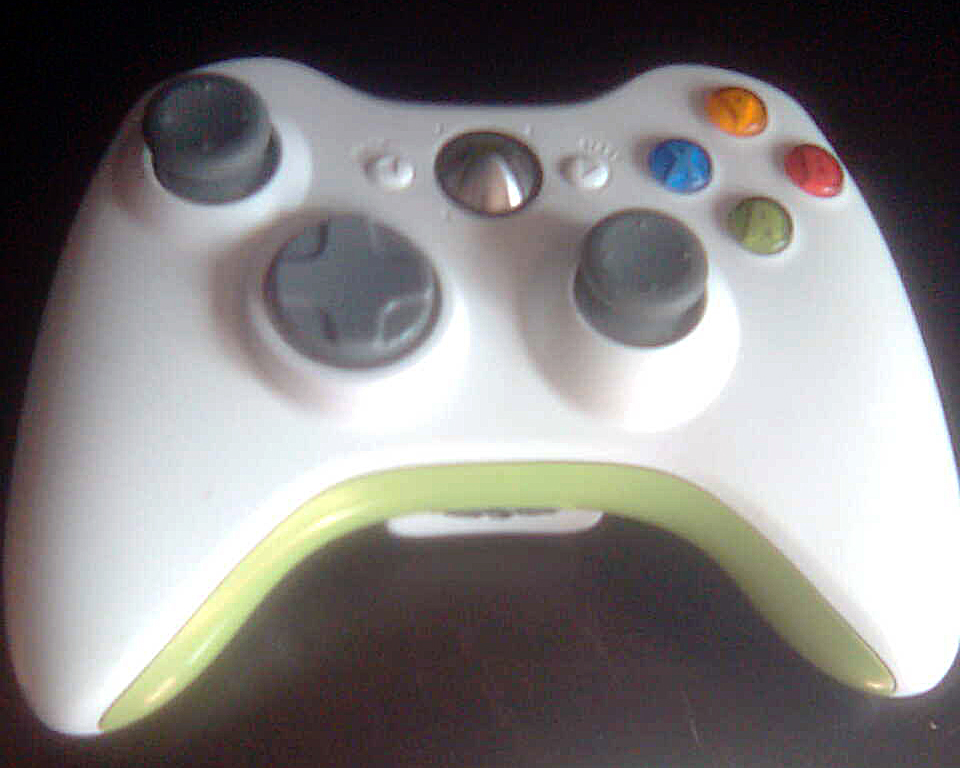
Wireless controller bundled with the "Launch Team Edition" Xbox 360

- Launch Team Edition controllers were bundled with the "Xbox 360 Launch Team Edition", given exclusively to members of the Xbox launch team by Microsoft in November 2005. These white wireless controllers feature green accents at the front in place of the standard grey.
- Yellow controllers were included with the 100 Limited Edition The Simpsons Movie Xbox 360 Pro consoles announced in May 2007, and given away as prizes in special events and promotions.
- Orange LIVE TURNS FIVE controllers were released in November 2007, and were given away to selected members of the media.

== Guide button ==
The Xbox 360 controller has a guide button in the center of its face that provides a new functionality. This button is surrounded by a ring of lights divided into four quadrants that provide gamers with different types of information during game play. For instance, during a split screen multiplayer match, a particular quadrant will light up to indicate to a player which part of the screen they are playing on at that time. In this case, when the user pushes the button, they access the Xbox guide; a menu which provides access to features like messaging friends, downloading content, voice chat and customizing soundtracks, while staying in the game. The Guide button also allows users to turn off the controller or the console by holding the button for a few seconds (rather than simply pressing it).

== Accessories ==
=== Rechargeable Battery Pack ===
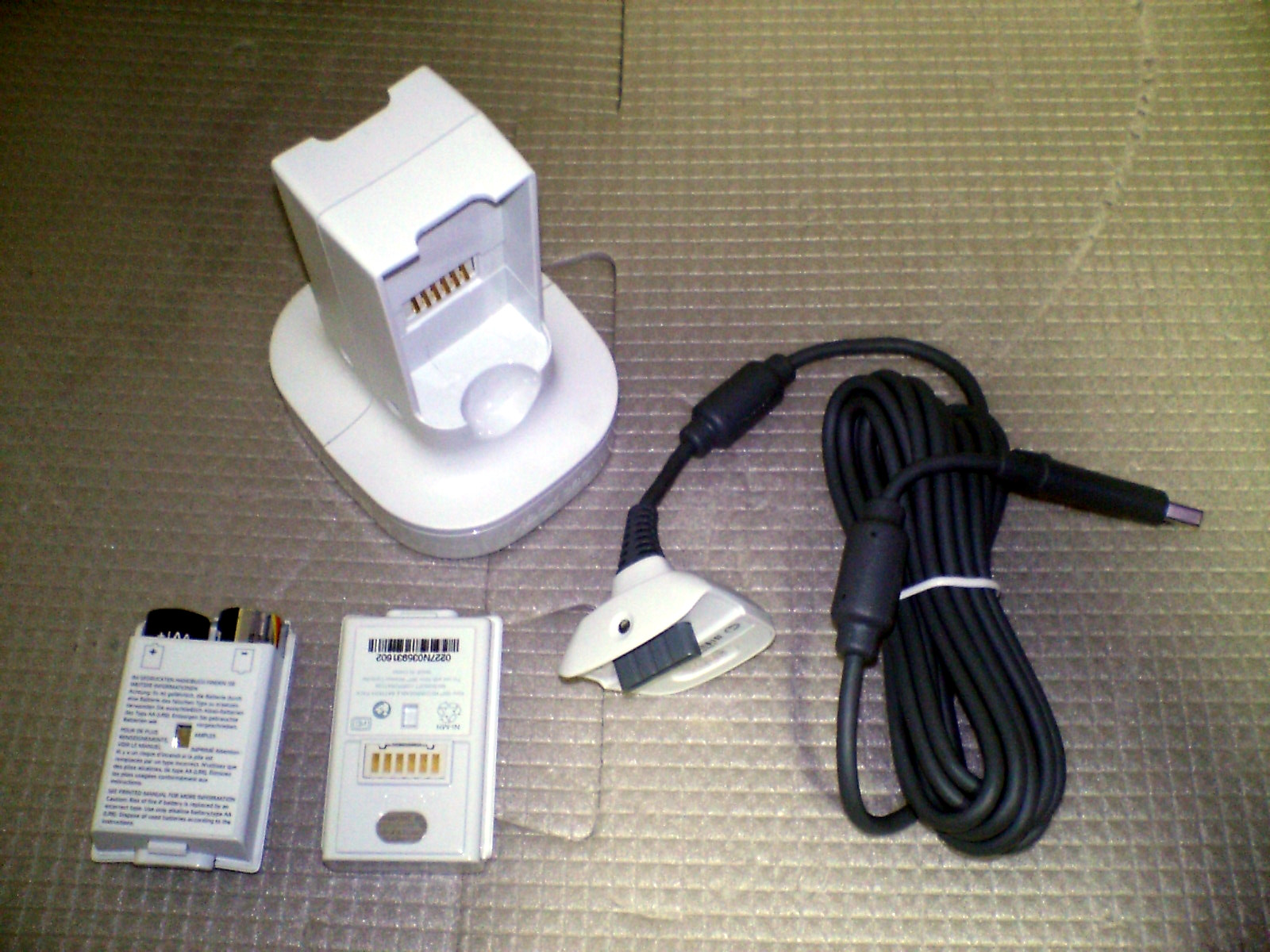
Battery Pack, Play & Charge Cable and Quick Charger

The Rechargeable Battery Pack is a nickel metal hydride (NiMH) battery pack, which provides up to 25 hours of continuous gaming for the wireless controller. It is an alternative to disposable AA batteries, which differ slightly in voltage and have higher disposal costs (financial and environmental). It ships as part of, and can be charged by, the Play & Charge Kit and the Quick Charge Kit. To fully charge the battery pack takes approximately 2 hours with the Quick Charge Kit; the Play & Charge Kit takes longer (and depends on whether the controller is being used). An upgraded, 35-hour version is included with improved Play & Charge Kits and "transforming D-pad" controllers, while a 40-hour version is included with the improved Quick Charge Kit.

=== Wireless Gaming Receiver ===
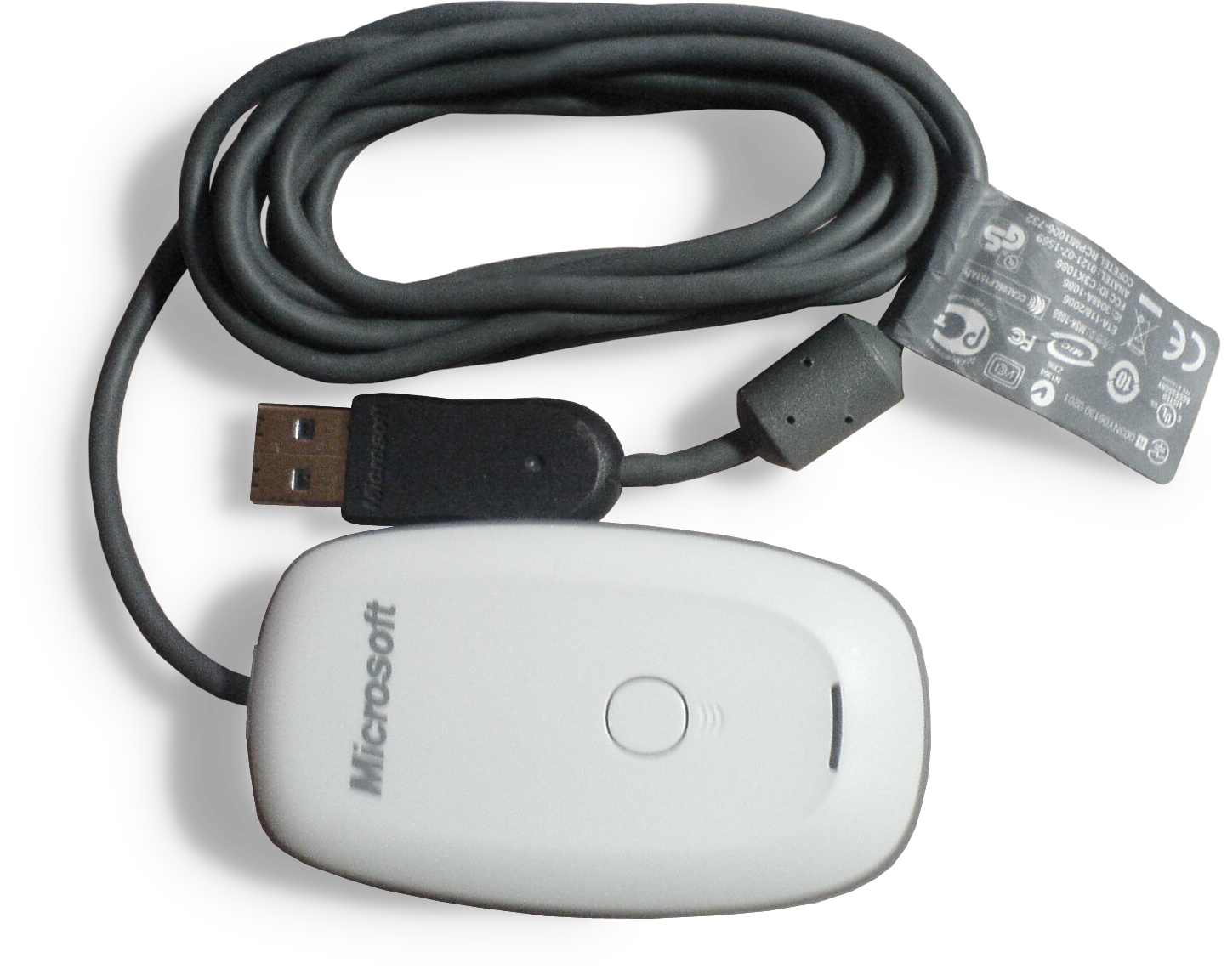
The Wireless Gaming Receiver for Windows

The Wireless Gaming Receiver (sold as "Crossfire Wireless Gaming Receiver" in the UK) allows wireless Xbox 360 accessories, such as wireless gamepads, racing wheels and headsets, to be used on a Windows-based PC. The device acts in a similar manner to an Xbox 360, allowing up to 4 controllers and 4 headsets at a time to be connected to the receiver. The device has a 30-foot (10 meter) range and a six-foot (2 meter) USB cable. It is specifically designed to work with games bearing the "Games for Windows" logo, but will function with most games that permit a standard PC gamepad. The official Xbox website noted that the adapter will work with "all future wireless devices".

=== Messenger Kit ===
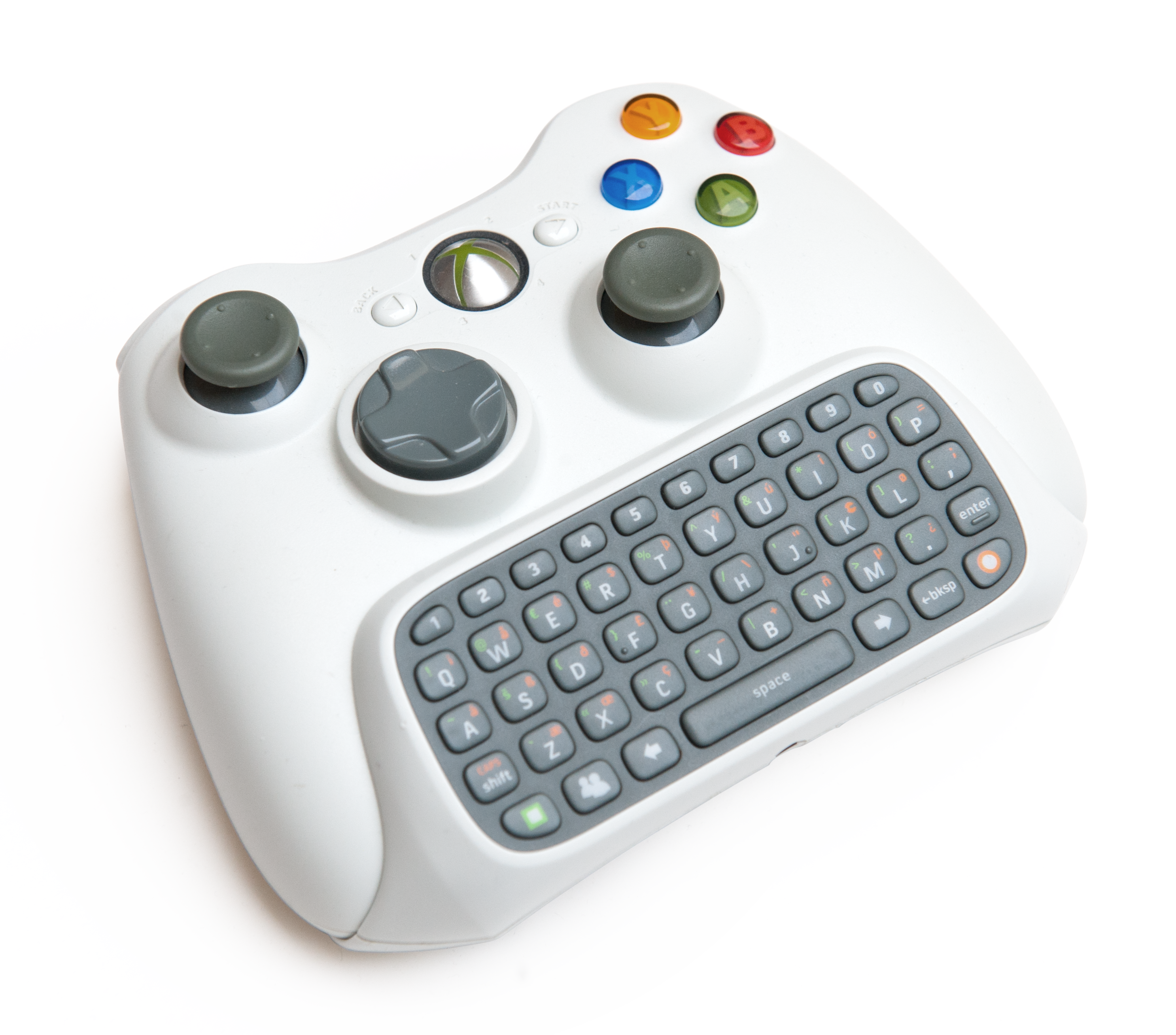
Xbox 360 Chatpad from the Messenger Kit attached to a wireless controller

The Messenger Kit consists of a wired Xbox 360 headset and a small keyboard known as the "Chatpad". The Chatpad connects to the front of the controller and may be used for any standard text input on the console. It is not currently compatible with the wireless gaming receiver.

== Non-gaming uses ==
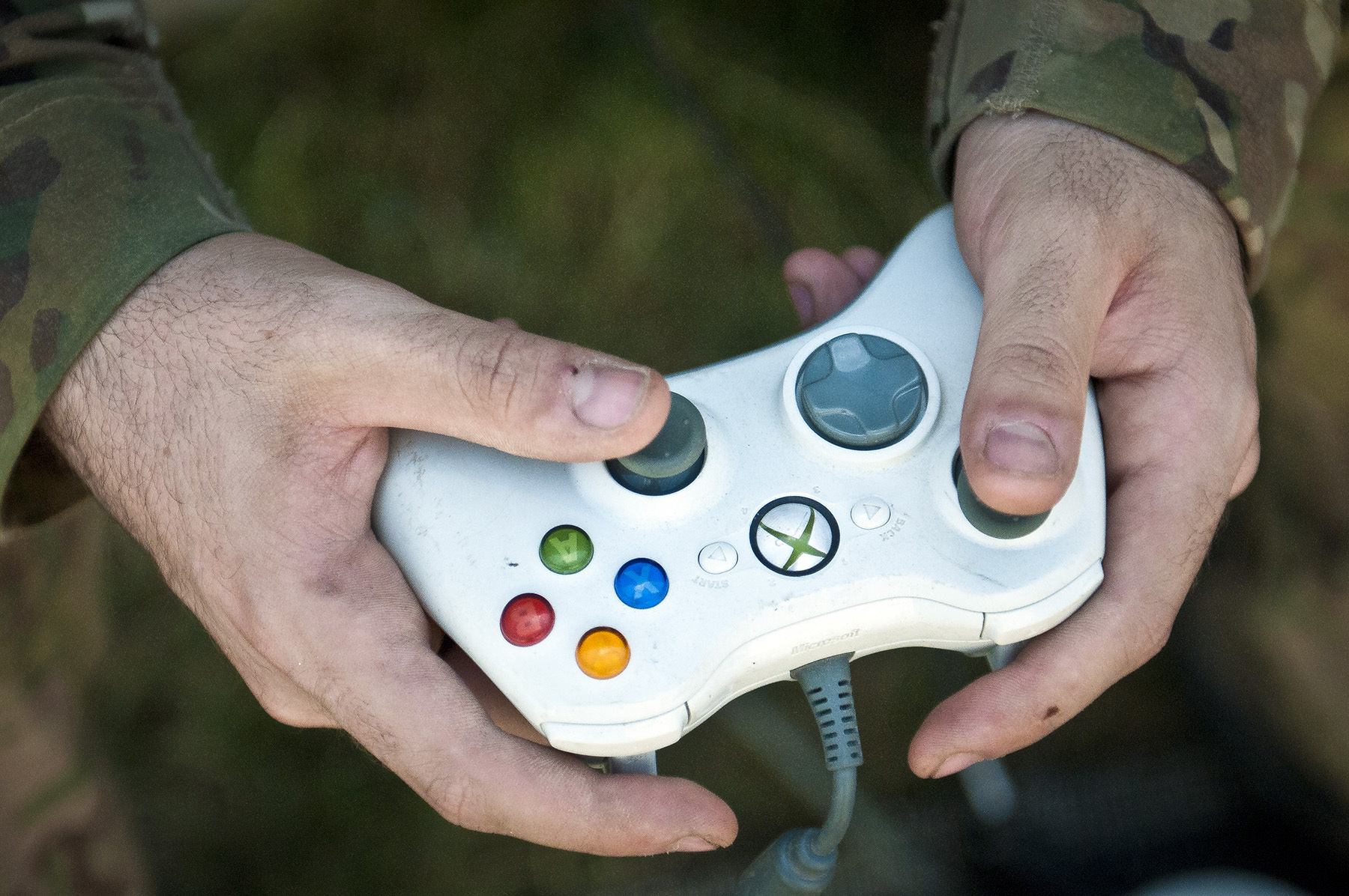
A United States Army soldier using a wired Xbox 360 controller to operate a bomb disposal robot during Operation Enduring Freedom in Afghanistan in 2011

The United States Navy has announced that it plans to use Xbox 360 controllers to control periscopes on new Virginia-class submarines, for both cost and familiarity reasons.

== Reception ==
The Xbox 360 controller received positive reviews when it was released. Before then, as IGN stated, the original Xbox controller was "huge, ugly, cheap, and uncomfortable" and concluded to be an "abomination". Many of these problems were corrected with Microsoft's releases of the Xbox controller S and then the Xbox 360 controller. IGN credited the Xbox 360 controller for its being one of "the most ergonomically comfortable console controllers around". It was also praised for its improved button placement, its functioning logo as a button, and Microsoft's choice of bottom-mounting headset ports as opposed to top-mounting them so as to minimize snagged wire problems.

== See also ==
- Microsoft SideWinder
- Xbox controller
- Xbox Wireless Controller
- Kinect
- Sixaxis
- DualShock
- PlayStation Move
- Wii Remote
