= After the Storm =

After the Storm may refer to:

== Film ==
- After the Storm (1915 film), an American short film directed by B. Reeves Eason
- After the Storm (1928 film), an American silent drama directed by George B. Seitz
- After the Storm (1943 film), a French comedy drama film directed by Pierre-Jean Ducis
- After the Storm (1945 film), a Hungarian drama film directed by József Daróczy
- After the Storm (1948 film), an Austrian drama film directed by Gustav Ucicky
- After the Storm (1955 film), a Mexican film directed by Roberto Gavaldón
- After the Storm (1990 film), an Argentine film; winner of the Golden Columbus award at the Huelva Ibero-American Film Festival
- After the Storm (2001 film), a film directed by Guy Ferland, based on a short story by Ernest Hemingway
- After the Storm (2009 film), a documentary with a score by Stephen Flaherty
- After the Storm (2016 film), a Japanese film directed by Hirokazu Koreeda

== Literature and photography ==
- After the Storm, a novel in the Americana Series by Janet Dailey
- "After the Storm", a short story by Ernest Hemingway included in his collection Winner Take Nothing (1933)
- After the Storm, a Kazakh novel by Gabiden Mustafin
- After the Storm: True Stories of Disaster and Recovery at Sea (2002), a book by John Rousmaniere
- After the Storm, a 2001 photographic exhibition and 2007 book by Bob Walker

== Music ==
=== Albums ===
- After the Storm (Crosby, Stills & Nash album) or the title song, 1994
- After the Storm (Monica album), 2003
- After the Storm (Norman Brown album) or the title song, 1994
- After the Storm (Shatta Wale album) or the title song, "Afta Di Storm", 2016
- After the Storm, by Atrocity, 2010
- After the Storm, an EP by Alex Band, 2012
- After the Storm, an EP by the Idoru, 2003

=== Songs ===
- "After the Storm" (Ai song), 2013
- "After the Storm" (Kali Uchis song), 2018
- "After the Storm" (Wynn Stewart song), 1976
- "After the Storm", by Carly Simon from Playing Possum, 1975
- "After the Storm", by the Cynic Project, 2000
- "After the Storm", by Mumford & Sons from Sigh No More, 2009
- "After the Storm", by Oh Land from Family Tree, 2019
