= Xbox controller =

Controller for Microsoft's Xbox console

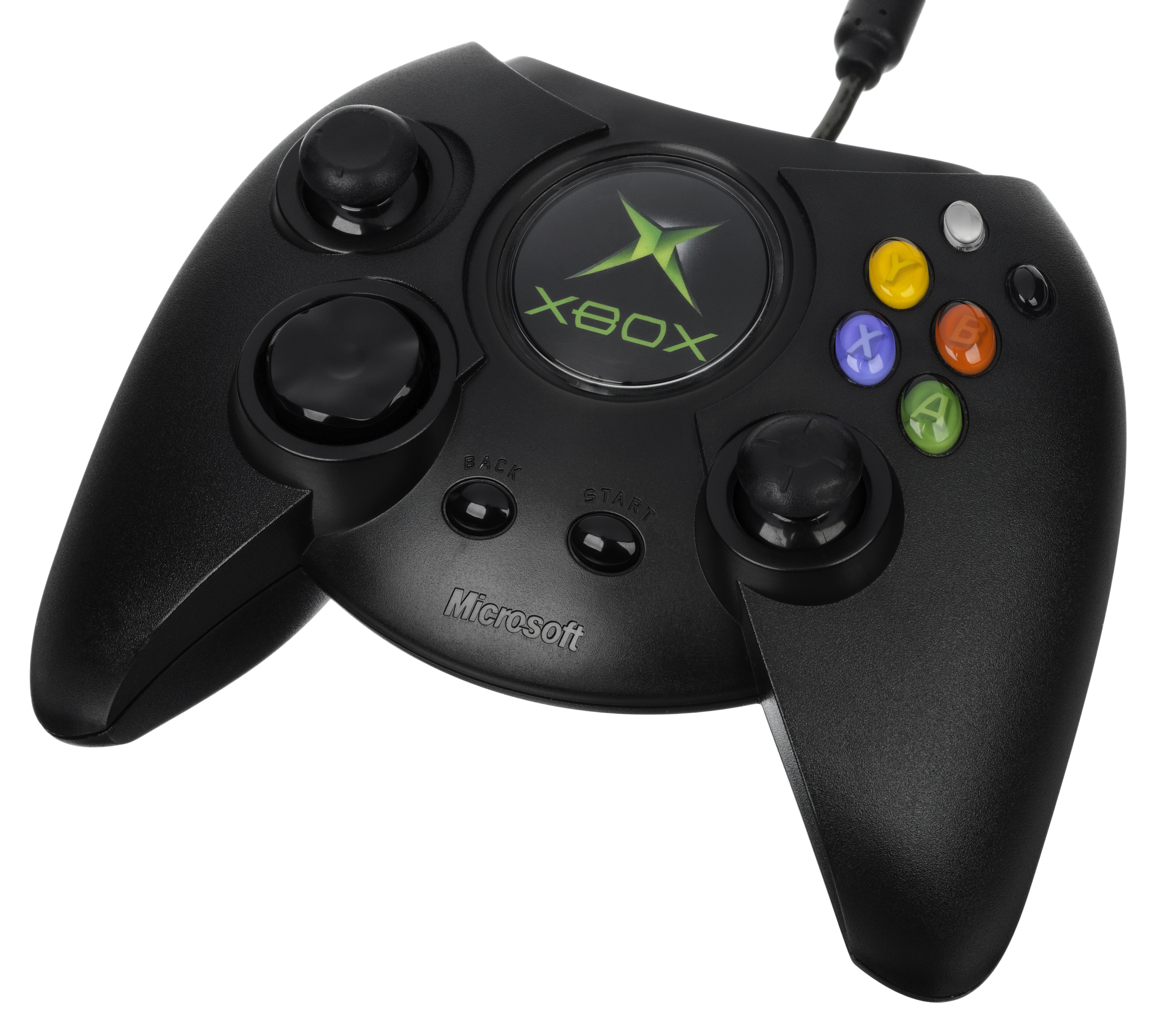
- The Xbox "Duke" Controller (primary controller from 2001 to 2002)
- Manufacturer: Microsoft
- Type: Gamepad
- Generation: Sixth
- Released: NA: November 15, 2001; PAL: March 14, 2002; Controller S: JP: February 22, 2002; NA: April 29, 2002; EU: November 1, 2002
- Input: 2 × clickable analog sticks (8-bit precision); 2× analog triggers; 6× pressure-sensitive buttons (Black, White); 2 × other digital buttons; Digital D-pad
- Connectivity: Xbox controller port
- Successor: Xbox 360 controller

The Xbox controller is the primary game controller for Microsoft's Xbox home video game console and was introduced at the Game Developers Conference in 2000.

The first-generation Xbox controller (nicknamed the "Duke") was the first controller bundled with Xbox systems for all territories except Japan. A smaller and redesigned variant, called "Controller S", was sold and bundled with the console in Japan. It was later released in other territories and by the end of 2003 had replaced the first-generation controller worldwide. The larger original controller remained available as an optional accessory, and was re-released for the Xbox One after fans requested it back.

== Design ==
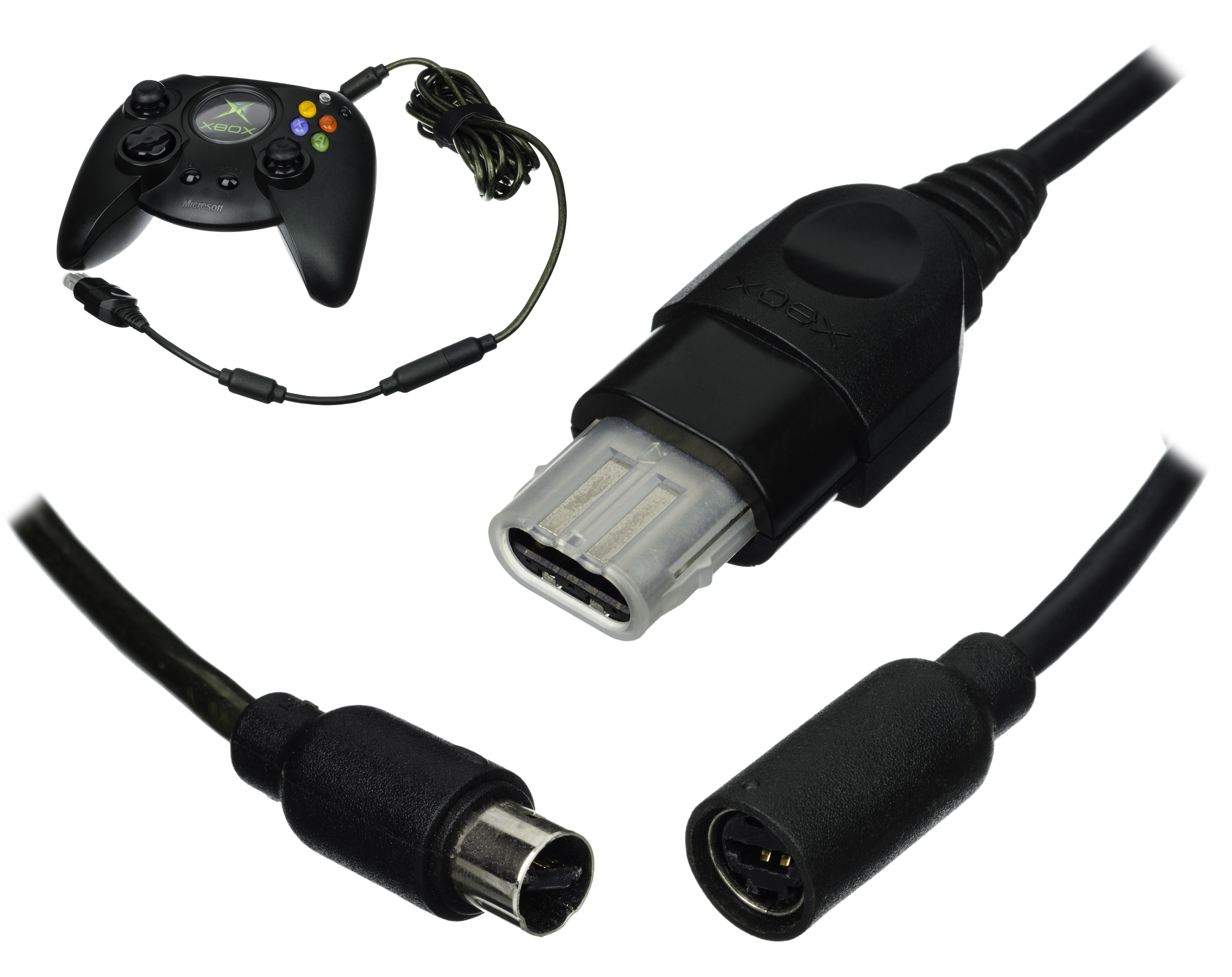
The Xbox controller features breakaway dongles to avoid damage to the console if the cord is tripped over.

The Xbox controller features dual vibration motors and a layout similar to the contemporary GameCube controller: two analog triggers, two analog sticks (both are also digitally clickable buttons), a digital directional pad, a Back button, a Start button, two accessory slots and six 8-bit analog action buttons (A/Green, B/Red, X/Blue, Y/Yellow, White, and Black). Project leads J Allard and Cam Ferrari aimed for a controller with every feature the team liked from preceding ones: slots from the Dreamcast controller, two sticks from the PlayStation's original DualShock and six frontal buttons from the revised Sega Genesis controller.

When the physical design of the controller began, circuit boards for the controller had already been manufactured. Microsoft had asked their supplier, Mitsumi Electric, for a similar folded and stacked circuit board design used in Sony's DualShock 2 controller, but the company refused to manufacture such a design for Microsoft. This led to the controller being bulky and nearly three times the size of Sony's controller. This initial controller design was never launched in Japan, where the console instead launched with a smaller, redesigned version named "Controller S" that did use the more compact circuit board design.

Duke and original Japanese Controller S controllers made in Malaysia featured a dark green cable. When the Controller S was released in the West, early models featured the green cable, however later Controller S models switched to a black cable and were made in China.

The Duke's digital directional pad is visually similar to the digital directional pad on Microsoft's previous game controller, the Microsoft SideWinder. However, the Controller S dropped that design and replaced it with a plus shape on a disc.

== Models ==
=== The Duke ===
Seamus Blackley, a video game developer for Xbox, helped design an early prototype controller. The first-generation Xbox controller, originally nicknamed the "Fatty" and later "The Duke", was originally the controller bundled with Xbox systems for all territories except Japan. According to Blackley, the Duke name came from Brett Schnepf, the project manager of hardware for Microsoft during the Xbox's development, whose son was named Duke.

The controller was oversized and was not very well received. While the product was being announced, some audience members threw objects at Blackley while he was on stage. The controller has been criticized for being bulky compared to other video game controllers; it was awarded "Blunder of the Year" by Game Informer in 2001, a Guinness World Record for the biggest controller in Guinness World Records Gamer's Edition 2008, and was ranked the second worst video game controller ever by IGN editor Craig Harris.

Over fifteen years later, Seamus Blackley contacted Phil Spencer, the head of the Xbox division, and pitched an idea to revive the old controller, following a series of joking posts through social media that showed strong consumer desire for the controller. Spencer gave Blackley the rights to the Duke controller. The original design was modified with some subtle changes to the bumper design, shoulder buttons and overall layout to make it compatible with the Xbox One, as well as an LCD screen that displays the original Xbox boot sequence when turned on. The Duke was released for Xbox One and PC on April 30, 2018, through a partnership with Hyperkin.

=== Controller S ===
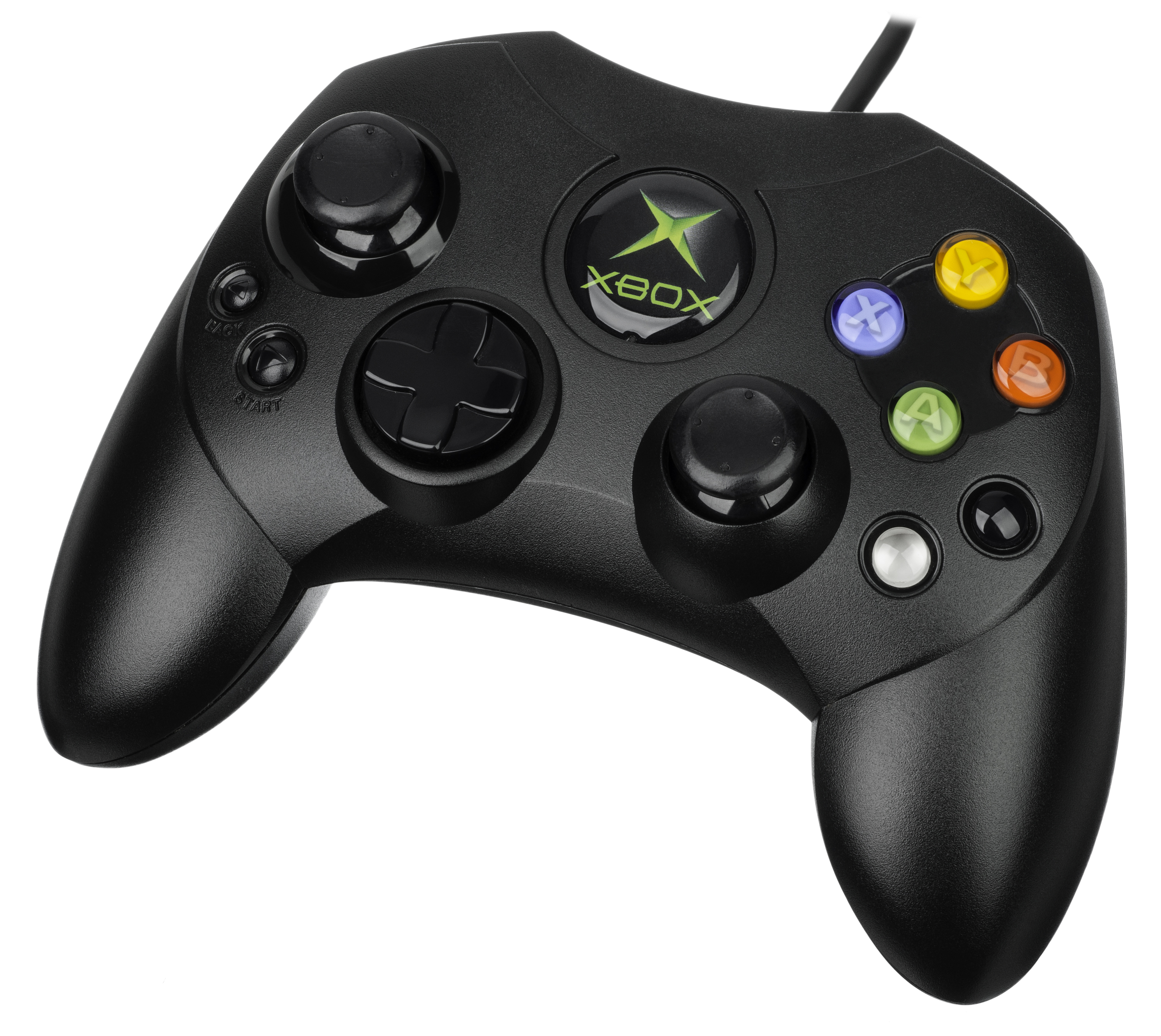
Xbox Controller S

The "Controller S" (codenamed "Akebono") is smaller and lighter, designed for users with smaller hands. After the original controller had received much criticism, the "Controller S" was released in other territories and in 2002 replaced the first-generation controller in the US Xbox's retail package, and Europe in 2003, with the larger original controller remaining available as an accessory.

== Memory unit ==
An 8 MB removable solid state memory card can be plugged into the controller in a manner similar to that of the Dreamcast's Visual Memory Unit or the Nintendo 64's Controller Pak. Game saves can either be copied from the hard drive when in the Xbox dashboard's memory manager or saved during a game whenever the memory card is inserted. Most Xbox game saves can be copied to the memory unit and moved to another console but some Xbox saves are digitally signed; each console has a unique signing key, and some games (e.g. Ninja Gaiden and Dead or Alive Xtreme Beach Volleyball) will not load saved games signed by a different Xbox, limiting the utility of the memory card. Some game saves can be tagged as uncopyable (like Burnout 3: Takedown) or simply padded to over 8 MB (Star Wars: Knights of the Old Republic). The signing mechanism has been reverse-engineered by the Xbox hacking community, who have developed tools to modify savegames to work in a different console, though the signing key of the recipient Xbox (the "HDkey") and the ramped-up title key of the game (the "authkey") must be known.

It is also possible to save an Xbox Live account on a memory unit, to simplify its use on more than one Xbox.

== See also ==
- Microsoft SideWinder
- Xbox 360 controller
- Xbox Wireless Controller
