= Operation Sidewinder =

Operation Sidewinder may refer to:

- Operation Sidewinder, a coalition military operation of the Iraq War
- Operation Sidewinder (play), by Sam Shepard, 1970
