= Kia Sidewinder =

2006 concept car

The Kia Sidewinder was a concept car for the Design Challenge competition in 2006 Los Angeles Motor Show.

Designed at the Kia America Design Center by Marc Mainville, the Kia Sidewinder concept was meant to be an environmentally friendly vehicle.
