= Microsoft SideWinder =

Digital video game controllers

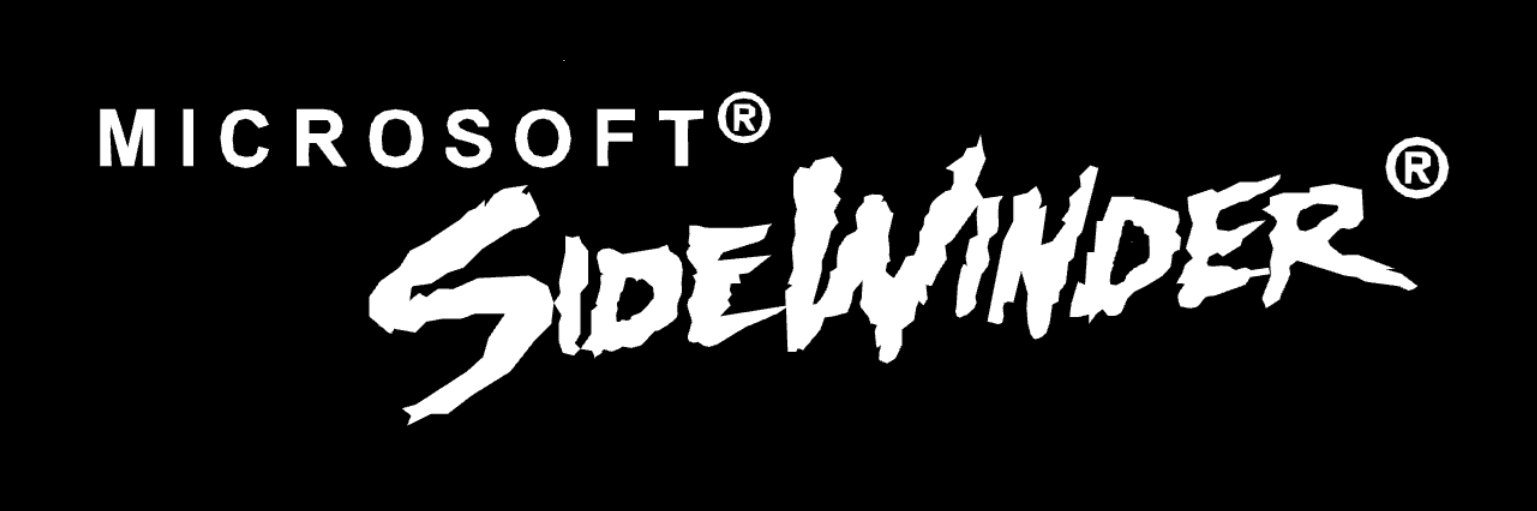
Original Microsoft Sidewinder logo

Microsoft SideWinder is a former brand name for a family of video gaming peripherals developed by Microsoft for PCs. It was initially marketed from 1995 to 2003 consisting of game controllers, then again from 2007 until the early 2010s with gaming mice and keyboards.

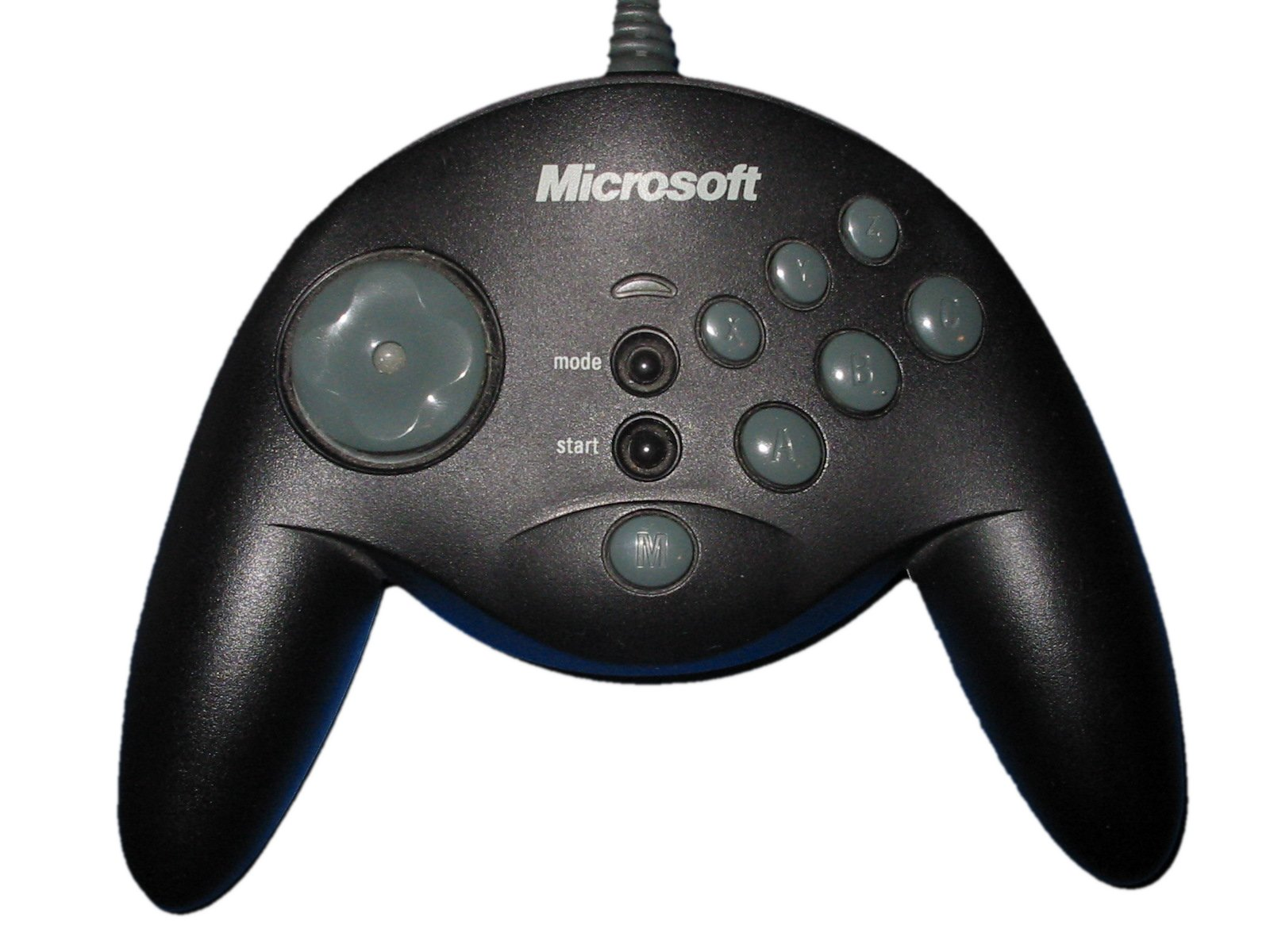
First-generation Microsoft SideWinder gamepad

The term "SideWinder" describes many types of Microsoft's PC game controllers including joysticks, gamepads and steering wheels. Several types of joysticks were made, including the Force Feedback 2, the 3D Pro, and the regular SideWinder joystick. Also, several types of gamepads were made, such as the original game port version, a plug-and-play game port version, and the USB version. Steering wheels are the Precision Racing Wheel and the Force Feedback Wheel variants which include throttle and brake pedals. The family also includes some more exotic devices such as the SideWinder Game Voice system and the SideWinder Strategic Commander.

The SideWinder family of products was discontinued by Microsoft in 2003, citing poor sales. The company since re-entered the gaming hardware market, attempting to design a standardized gamepad for Windows Vista with both the wired Xbox 360 controller and the Wireless Gaming Receiver that allows the use of the wireless Xbox 360 controller on a PC. In August 2007, Microsoft announced they were relaunching the SideWinder line of gaming peripherals, starting with the SideWinder Mouse. The mouse was given an MSRP of $80 and a launch date of October 2007.

== First generation ==
Although intended only for use with Microsoft Windows, Microsoft SideWinder game controllers can also be used with macOS, Mac OS 9 with third-party software, and Linux.

Table of SideWinder models
Name	Type	Release date	Force Feedback	Interface		
Name	Type	Release date	Force Feedback	Game Port	USB Adapter	USB
Microsoft SideWinder Game Pad 1.0	Game Pad	September 11, 1996	No	Yes	No	No
Microsoft SideWinder Game Pad 2.0	Game Pad	September 11, 2001	No	No	No	Yes
Microsoft SideWinder Game Pad Pro	Game Pad	May 31, 1999	No	No	No	Yes
Microsoft SideWinder Plug & Play Game Pad	Game Pad	August 1, 2000	No	No	No	Yes
Microsoft SideWinder Freestyle Pro	Game Pad	August 12, 1998	No	Yes	Yes	No
Microsoft SideWinder Dual Strike	Game Pad	May 31, 1999	No	No	No	Yes
Microsoft SideWinder 3D Pro	Joystick	October 9, 1995	No	Yes	No^{4}	No
Microsoft SideWinder Standard	Joystick	October 9, 1995	No	Yes	No^{4}	No
Microsoft SideWinder 3D Pro Plus (Part No. 97462)^{1}	Joystick		No	Yes	No^{4}	No
Microsoft SideWinder Precision Pro (Part No. 57540)^{1}	Joystick	August 12, 1997	No	Yes	Yes	No
Microsoft SideWinder Precision Pro 2.0	Joystick		No	Yes	Yes	No
Microsoft SideWinder Precision 2^{2}	Joystick	July 29, 1998	No	No	No	Yes
Microsoft SideWinder Joystick	Joystick	August 24, 2000	No	No	No	Yes
Microsoft SideWinder Force Feedback Pro	Joystick	August 12, 1997	Yes	Yes	No^{5}	No
Microsoft SideWinder Force Feedback 2	Joystick	August 12, 1998	Yes	No	No	Yes
Microsoft SideWinder Precision Racing Wheel	Wheel	May 31, 1999	No	No	No	Yes
Microsoft SideWinder Force Feedback Wheel Gameport	Wheel	August 13, 1997	Yes	Yes	No^{6}	No
Microsoft SideWinder Force Feedback Wheel USB^{3}	Wheel	August 12, 1998	Yes	No	No	Yes
Microsoft SideWinder Game Voice	Voice Device	August 24, 2000	No	No	No	Yes
Microsoft SideWinder Strategic Commander	Exotic	August 24, 2000	No	No	No	Yes
Microsoft SideWinder 92626 (Part No. X08-59073)	Joystick	~2002	No	No	No	Yes

^1 See bottom of device. Microsoft SideWinder 3D Pro Plus were sold as Sidewinder Precision Pro but have no USB support.

^2 Also known as Microsoft SideWinder Precision 2 1.0
^3 Also known as Microsoft SideWinder Force Feedback Wheel USB 1.0
^4 A user-made adapter exists for modern Windows versions (XP and later), Mac OS X and Linux.
^5 A user-made adapter exists, incorporating Force-feedback support for modern Windows versions (XP and later), Mac OS X and Linux. Game must also support FFB. There is a bug in the Windows 8 joystick control panel which causes the joystick to be reported as non-functional. Games will still recognize and use the joystick. Following the discontinuation of the Teensy 2.0, there's also a more recent version, using the Pi Pico.

^6 A user-made adapter exists for modern Windows versions (XP and later), Mac OS X and Linux. There is no support for Force-feedback in stable releases as of now, but experimental firmware with partial support has been published to a discussion thread.

=== Gamepad ===
The original Microsoft SideWinder gamepad had a digital directional pad, six face buttons, two trigger buttons, and a "Mode" and "Start" button. The original gameport version had a pass-through, so additional joypads or joysticks could be used without unplugging the SideWinder, and also allowed the connection of up to four SideWinder gamepads working simultaneously. Newer USB versions of the SideWinder gamepad have a round digital D-pad instead of the more traditional cross-shaped D-pad, and lack the mode button. The Microsoft SideWinder's button layout is very similar to that of the Sega Saturn controller, which was released over the same time period.

The Webdings dingbat font displays a picture of this gamepad for the character [Ä]

=== 3D Pro ===
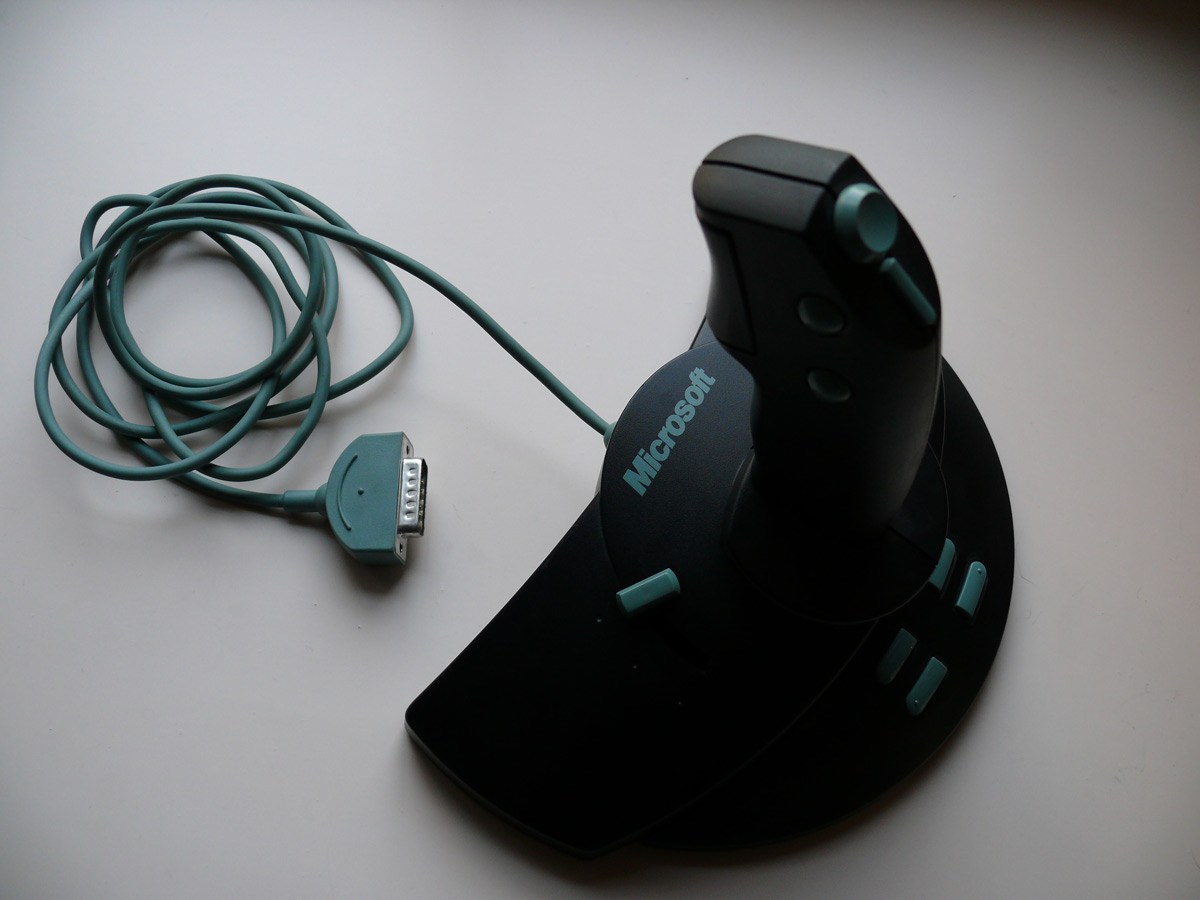
Microsoft SideWinder 3D Pro Joystick

As Microsoft's first SideWinder joystick, the 3D Pro was responsible for setting the overall design as seen in all of Microsoft's future joysticks. Designed as a gaming-neutral joystick, rather than a specialized joystick for use with realistic combat flight simulators, the 3D Pro was built with a functional, but low-key geometric design. Intended to rival the other sticks from the time, the 3D Pro included 8 buttons — 4 on the base, 4 on the stick — an 8-way hat switch, a slider-based throttle, and the stick itself was twistable for Z/rudder/spin control. By going with a geometric design however, it meant the 3D Pro lacked an effective adherence to ergonomic principles, making it unsuitable for long gaming sessions for some users.

Electronically, the 3D Pro used a digital/analog hybrid design that was intended to correct the outstanding flaws in traditional analog joysticks, such as drift and CPU overhead, by using a digital/optical tracking mechanism to keep perfect track of the joystick, and a digital communication method over the analog gameport. However, this digital mode required software support, and could not be used with many DOS games at the time (MechWarrior 2 being the only major exception), as most software and gameports were built completely around an analog design.

Additionally, some soundcard gameports, and so-called accelerated game-ports — which attempted to resolve CPU overhead issues presented by polling the gameport directly themselves — such as those produced by Gravis, would not always be able to handle the stick in digital mode.

The 3D Pro had a unique feature in that it could fall-back to an 'analog emulation' mode, where it could emulate either a CH Flightstick Pro or a Thrustmaster FCS (Selectable by a switch on the base), in environments where the digital mode would not work.

In this mode, manual calibration was required, the four base-buttons no longer function and, the joystick would function essentially like a CH Flightstick Pro or Thrustmaster FCS depending on the mode selector switch.

However, on later operating systems the digital mode would be less and less reliable, and on modern PCs most 3D Pro owners can only run in analog mode. The 3D Pro was popular enough to spawn a successor, the Precision Pro, which was a USB device and, while it did not work in DOS at all, was far more reliable under Windows despite quality issues.

The joystick was widely praised in its inception and was one of the few joysticks with multiple buttons that did not require a keyboard pass-through. The stick was especially popular with MechWarrior and Descent players as it was one of the few multi-button joysticks supported by the games natively.

The joystick's popularity has created a small die-hard following, with many people still holding onto them despite their age. This resulted in the creation of a USB adapter for the 3D Pro.

The 3D Pro features as a character (Ã) in the Webdings dingbat font.

=== Standard ===
The SideWinder Standard joystick was a more basic joystick released around the same time as the 3D Pro. It was a simple two-button, three-axis joystick. It featured a trigger button, a thumb button and a throttle wheel on left side of the base. In addition it had two additional dials on the base for adjustment of the stick itself, one above stick and the other to the right of the stick. It used a gameport connector to interface with the computer.

=== Precision Pro ===
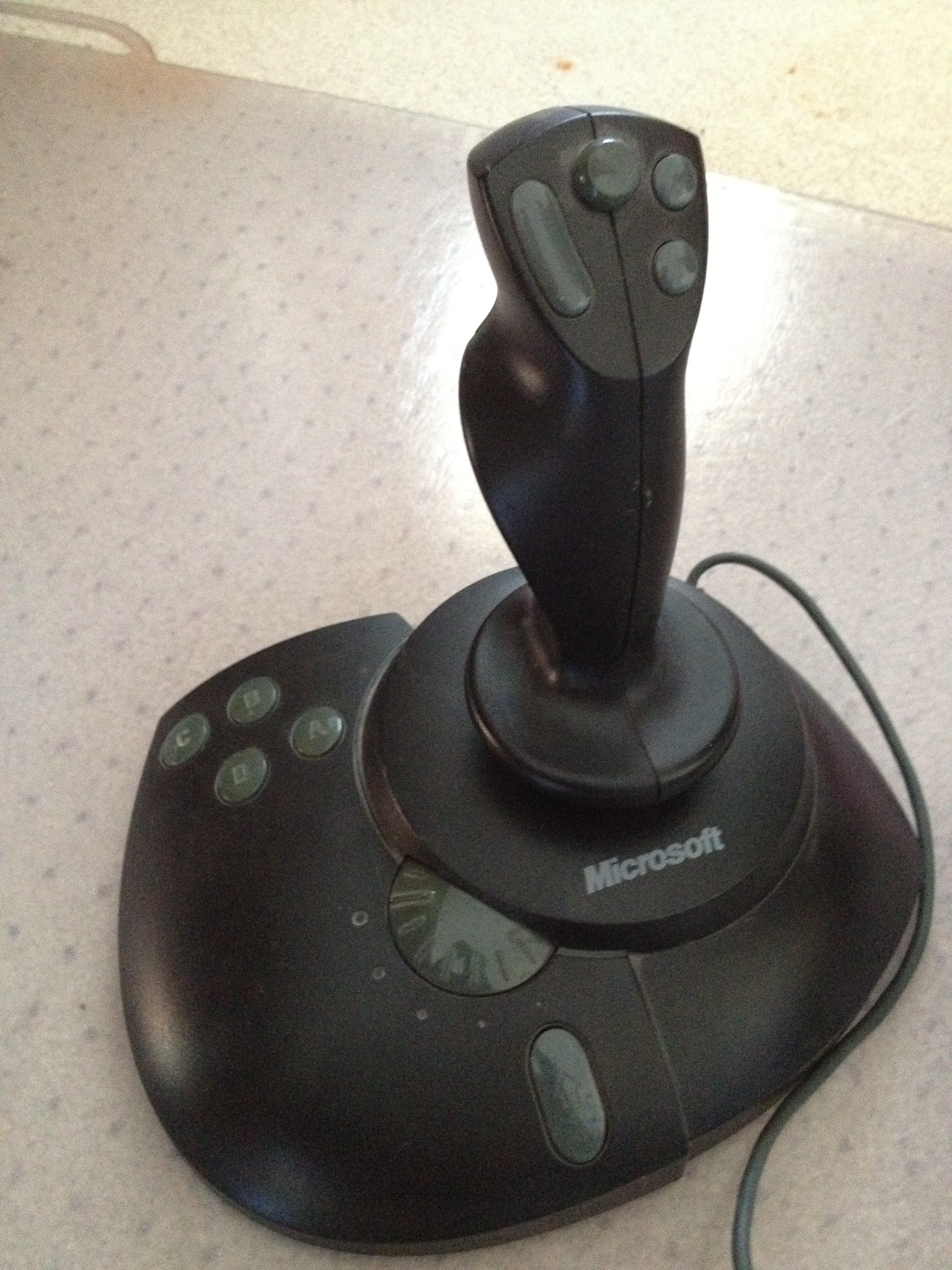
The Precision Pro joystick. The "hat" switch is visible at the top of the stick, and the throttle wheel at the bottom.

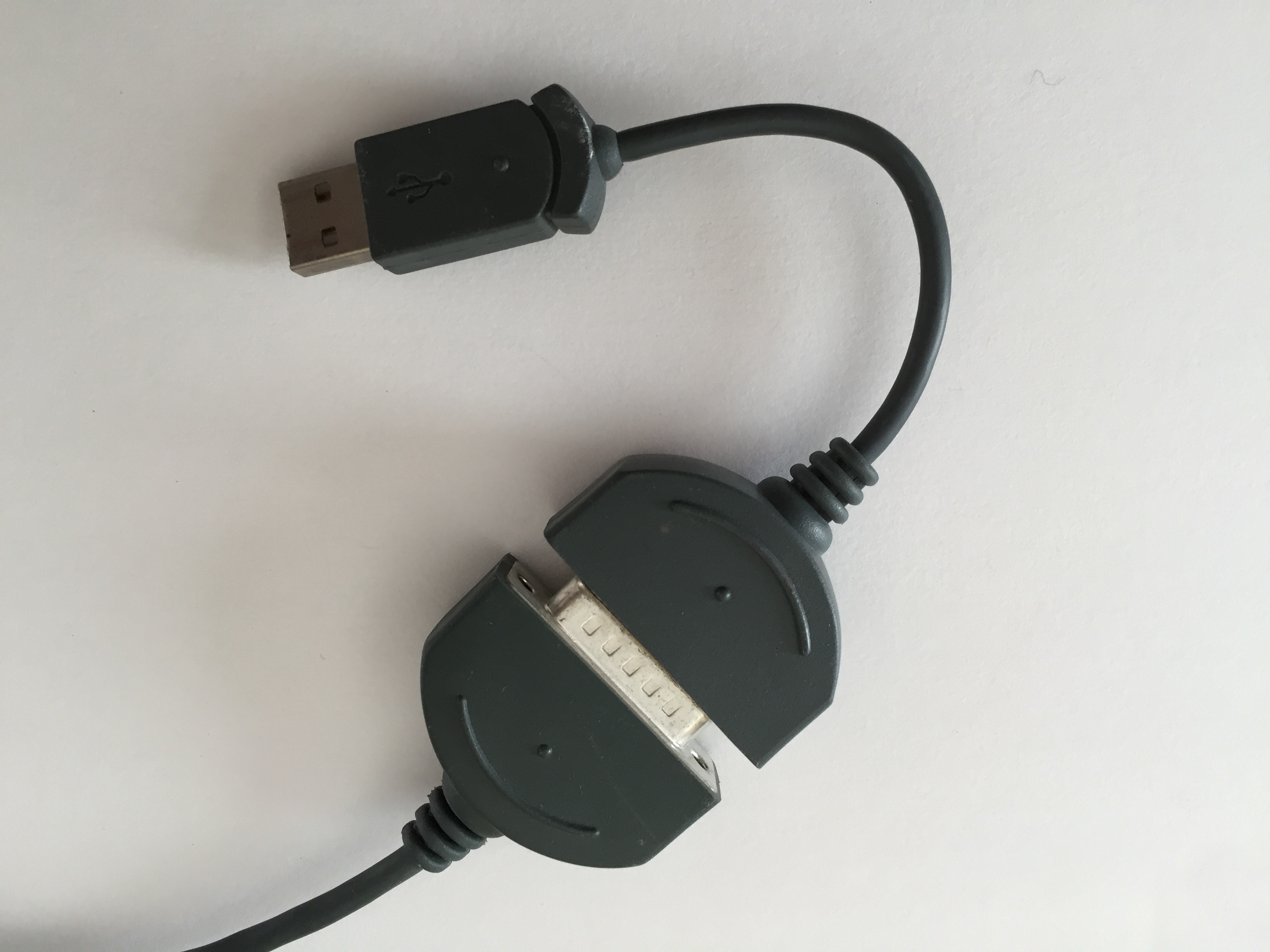
Microsoft Game port to USB Adapter. Packaged with Freestyle Pro, Precision Pro, and PP2. Never sold separate.

Microsoft introduced the SideWinder Precision Pro in 1995, correcting the ergonomic issues, fixing some of the electrical issues, and adding new features. The Precision Pro introduced a new stick that was far more ergonomic than the "geometric" design of the 3D Pro. Microsoft also gave the rest of the Precision Pro a more rounded design, replacing the rectangular base buttons with more rounded versions at the top of the base, the slider-based throttle with a wheel-based throttle, and the base itself was made more rounded. The Precision Pro also added a shift button to the base, doubling the number of possible button combinations.

Signatures can be seen inside the joystick, on the base coverplate. Fred Iyc and Edie Adams are among the 17 people who have signed it.

For its electronics, the Precision Pro featured a refined hybrid system, resolving some of the hardware compatibility issues with the 3D Pro. However, with the widespread introduction of USB in consumer computers shortly after the Precision Pro was released, Microsoft soon re-released the joystick in a USB-compatible form (joysticks labeled as Part No. X03-57540, Product I.D. 85791-579-2177031-00000). The revised joystick still featured a gameport connector but had additional circuitry for interfacing with USB, and was bundled with a USB converter (a DIY converter project exists). Original Precision Pros remain incompatible with this converter, but a user made converter exists. The creation of the USB converter bypassed the problems with the analog gameport entirely, and as a result became the true solution to the electrical problems. However, due to a flaw in the design of the Precision Pro, in rare cases the stick would build up a static charge in its electronics and require either a complex process to discharge that was not always successful, or simply needed to stay unpowered for a number of hours to slowly discharge on its own. This is also one of the first joysticks to use light sensors instead of potentiometers so it required no calibration, and thus had no electronical moving parts. The only moving parts were mechanical on the throttle and joystick pivots which gave this joystick virtually unlimited lifetime. The Precision Pro 2 had reintroduced potentiometers to save money and thus their lifetime was limited to wear and tear of the potentiometers.

Thanks to the timing of the launch of the Precision Pro to coincide with the widespread launch of USB along the ergonomic corrections and rarity of the static charge problem, the Precision Pro saw a much higher sales volume and review scores than the earlier 3D Pro.

=== Force Feedback Pro ===
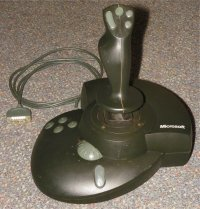
Microsoft SideWinder Force Feedback Pro Joystick

From technology acquired from EXOS, Inc, Microsoft then released a force feedback product called the Force Feedback Pro. Built on the design of the Precision Pro, the Force Feedback Pro differed only in the inclusion of motors for the force feedback effects, and the lack of USB compatibility. (A DIY converter project exists for the discontinued Teensy 2.0 board, and also a more recent project using the Pi Pico instead.) Due to the inclusion of the motors, the Force Feedback Pro was significantly larger and heavier than the Precision Pro, making it easy to differentiate between the two.

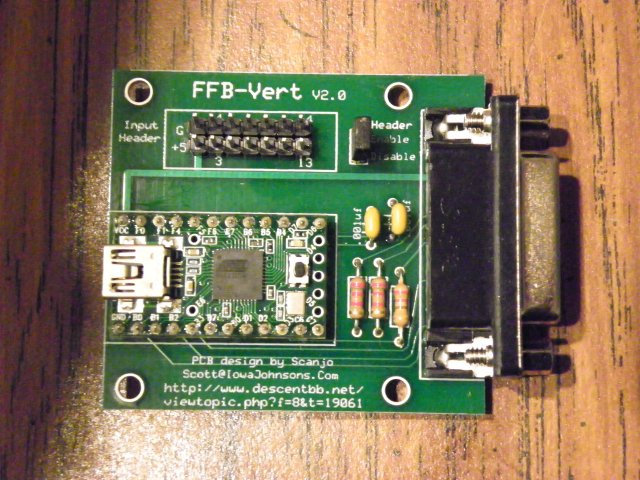
User-made game port to USB adapter supporting FFB on the Sidewinder Force Feedback Pro only. Simple joystick support on 3D Pro, Precision Pro, Precision Pro Plus, and Wheel.

As the PC joystick port is input-only, the only way for data to be sent to the joystick (to trigger force feedback events) is to use the MIDI capabilities of the port. This extension to the original gameport, first popularised by Creative Labs in their early sound cards, was intended to allow MIDI instruments to be connected to the joystick port but is used here to provide bidirectional communication with the joystick instead. Force feedback events are triggered by messages on MIDI channel 6, with effect data uploaded via SysEx messages. This means that force feedback would be unavailable on the earliest of PCs, where the gameports lack MIDI functionality.

=== Precision 2 ===
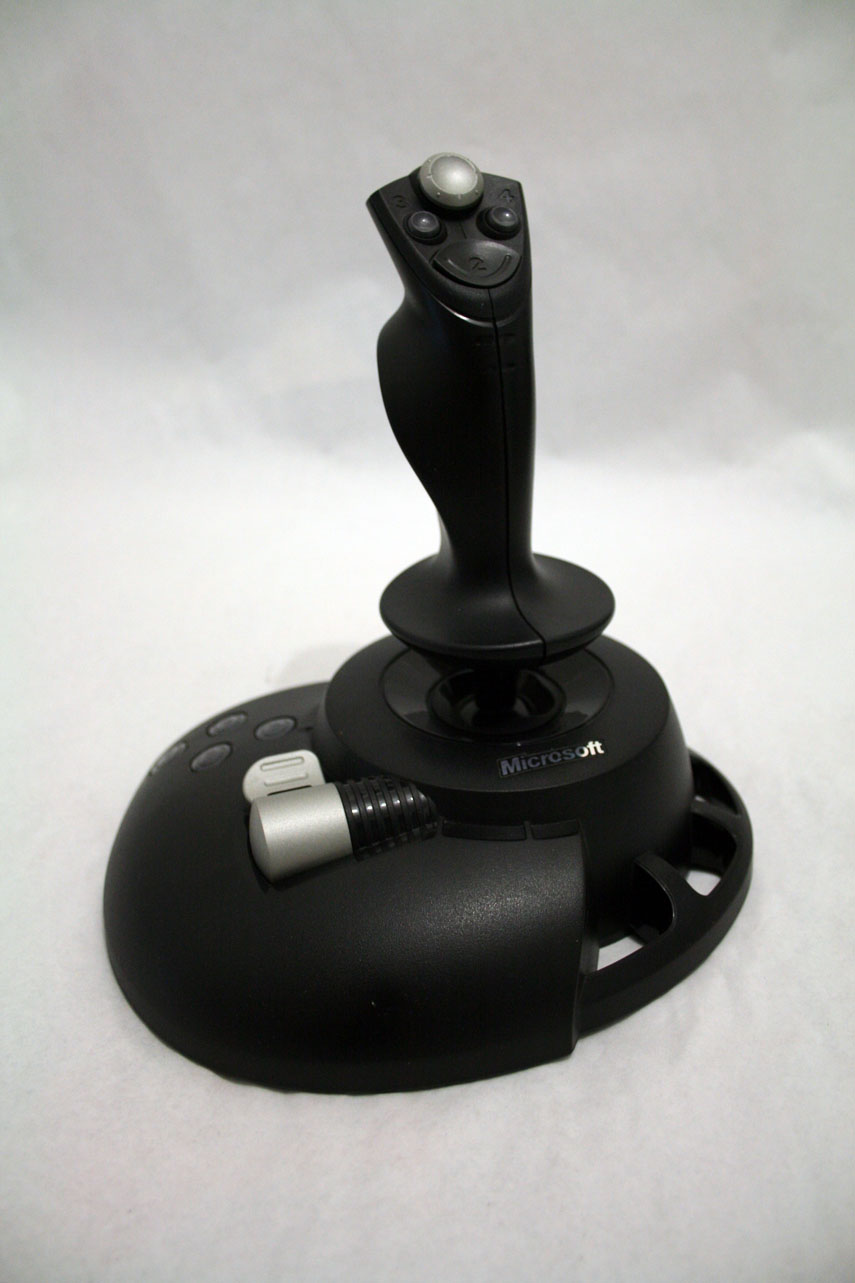
Microsoft SideWinder Precision 2 Joystick

The basis of Microsoft's last generation of SideWinder joysticks, the Precision 2 design was a further refinement of the previous Precision Pro. Compared to the Precision Pro, the Precision 2 dropped the Pro's shift button, replaced the throttle wheel with a more traditional lever, and rearranged the face buttons on the stick into a symmetric design. The Precision 2 also dropped all gameport compatibility by only shipping in a USB version, and was slightly smaller and lighter than the Pro. In spite of being Microsoft's 2nd-generation USB controller, the Precision 2 in particular seemed to suffer more from the USB SideWinder's long-standing static buildup problem than the original Precision Pro.

=== Force Feedback 2 ===
Along with replacing the Precision Pro with a new design, the Force Feedback Pro was replaced with a Precision 2 derivative, the Force Feedback 2. Compared to the Force Feedback Pro and the Precision 2, nothing new was added to the Force Feedback 2 that wasn't added to the Precision 2, in fact the shift button was taken away. The overall size and weight difference was not so great with the use of smaller motors. This joystick came in two varieties: one version with a silver trigger and textured hard plastic grip, and an updated version with translucent red parts (trigger, buttons 3 & 4, rounded part at the bottom) that switched to a rubberized coating on the grip. One of the main changes in the Force Feedback 2 from the Force Feedback Pro was removing the external power brick and replacing it with an internal power supply. Since the release of the Force Feedback 2, the stick has garnered a reputation of reliability and resiliency, many Force Feedback 2 sticks are still in use currently. The Wargamer named Force Feedback 2 as the first runner-up for their 2000 hardware of the year award.

=== Joystick ===
Using the Precision 2 design once again, Microsoft introduced a value-oriented SideWinder joystick, simply called the SideWinder Joystick. In spite of its value designation, the SideWinder Joystick was functionally similar to the Precision 2. The main features dropped were Z-axis control and the 8-way hat switch. Otherwise the differences were cosmetic, including shrinking the base, moving the throttle to the front of the base, and replacing 2 of the rounded buttons on the stick with more rectangular buttons. Support for this joystick was dropped with the advent of Windows XP.

=== Force Feedback Wheel ===
The Microsoft SideWinder Force Feedback Wheel is a steering wheel controller for sim racing. It was the first wheel controller to contain force feedback. The USB version of the wheel is compatible with one PlayStation 2 game, Tokyo Xtreme Racer Zero.

=== Strategic Commander ===
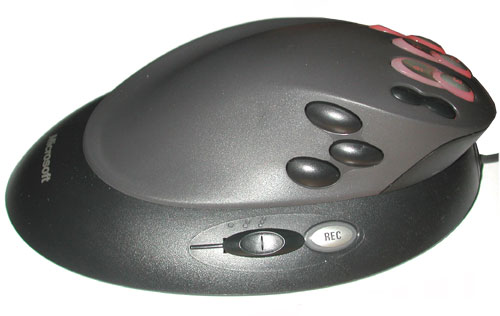
Microsoft Strategic Commander

The Strategic Commander is designed to complement a standard mouse/keyboard setup for Real Time Strategy games. It features a total of 6 programmable command buttons, 2 zoom buttons, 3 shift buttons, a macro record button and a 3-point configuration switch. The device also has three movement axes: X, Y and Z (rotation). Through extensive configuration of the shift and command buttons, it is possible to create a total of 24 different commands per configuration.

The Strategic Commander is a highly ergonomic device, and resembles a large mouse in shape, contoured for the left hand. It has an upper section attached to a base. On the upper section, the programmable buttons mentioned above are located near the tips of the index, middle and ring fingers for quick access. Three buttons are located near the thumb in an arc.

A feature of the device is that the upper section is also a 2-axis motion controller with additional support for rotation. It allows motion in the X, Y & Z axis (corresponding to Forward, Backwards, Strafe left & right, Turn left & right). This made it useful for first-person shooters, because one can aim weapons or look up and down with the right hand while simultaneously slewing position with the left hand, and change weapons etc. with the left finger buttons.

Software was included for the device to provide hotkeys for a number of (then popular) games. The buttons are also programmable, allowing the device to be used with other games and applications. For example, one application developed at Carnegie Mellon used the device as a peripheral for navigating massive social network maps.

Linux treats this device as a joystick (with all 3 axis and 12 plus 3 buttons) and can be used as one or using various applets can be used as a "joystick action to key press" device (e.g. Joy2Key)

=== Game Voice ===
The Game Voice is an early voice chat device. It was shaped like a hockey puck, with four channel buttons that allowed the user to speak to individual teammates. It could also be set to communicate with the entire team, or globally to all players. The driver software also allowed it to function as a voice command device using programmable macros. The package included a headset with an attached microphone, though these could be substituted with any other PC headset/microphone. The puck acted as an intermediary between the sound card and the sound input/output devices. The headset, along with the system speakers, plugged into the puck, where a switch could be used to set whether sound would be output from the speakers or the headset. The puck also had its own volume control. To provide power for the puck LEDs and drive the voice command and channel functions, a USB connection was also required. Microsoft recommended Game Voice as a microphone for use with the speech recognition feature of Microsoft Office XP.

Microsoft discontinued the product in 2003. By then, the market for voice chat had seen intense competition from downloadable and free-to-use software like Ventrilo and TeamSpeak, among others. These software packages only charge the host or server, whereas each person would have to own a Game Voice in order to use the hardware and software. As a result, the Game Voice ultimately lost that market. However, these competing software packages do not offer voice command systems.

Microsoft has not released the hardware specifications so that an open source driver could be developed. The device is supported under Windows XP, but no new driver is planned for Windows Vista. Despite this, Linux based operating systems can use this device using various third party applets (i.e. Kamevoice)

=== Freestyle Pro ===
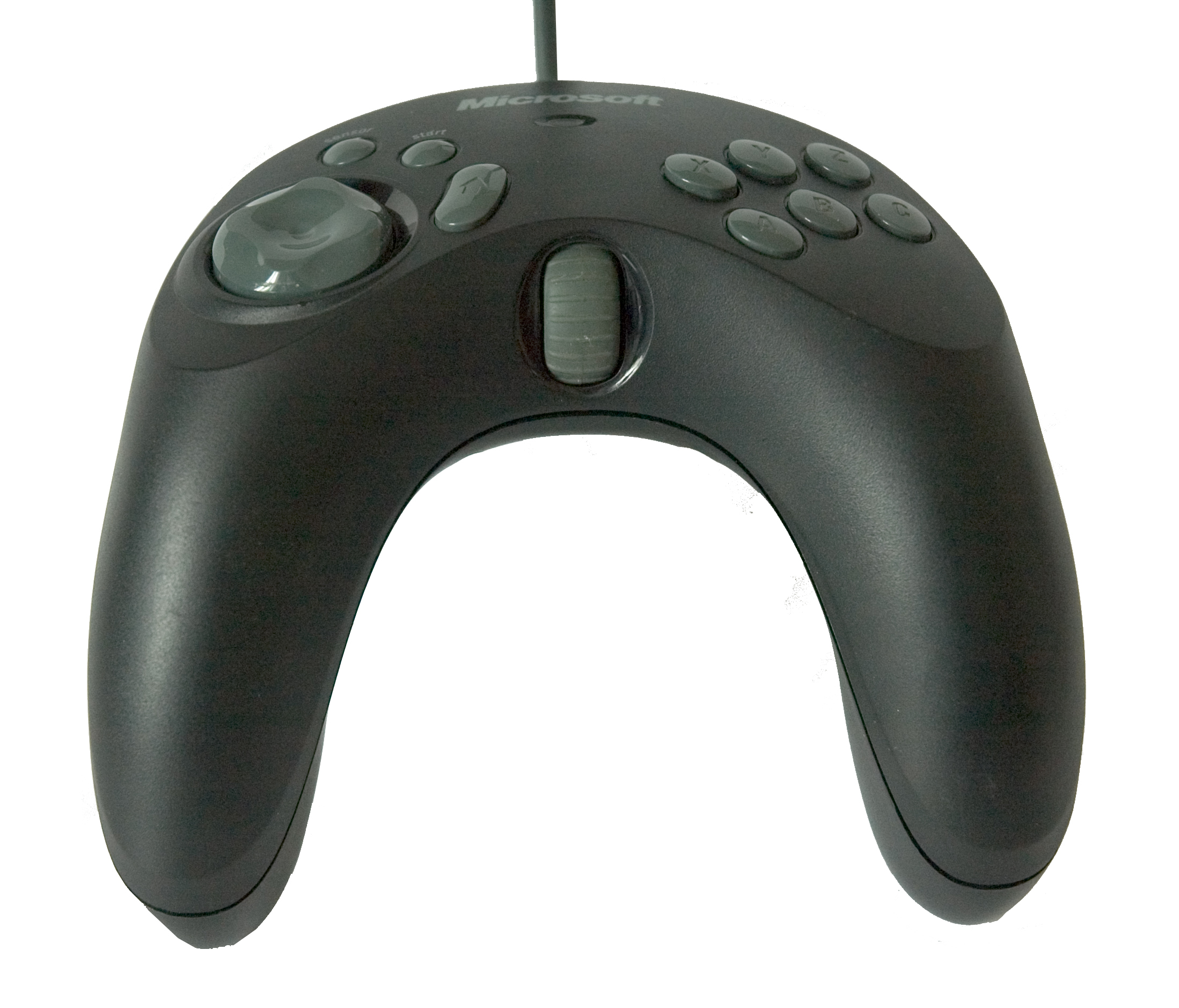
SideWinder Freestyle Pro gamepad

The Freestyle Pro, released in 1998, was a unique gamepad, as the up-down-left-right directions in analogue mode were controlled by the physical movement of the controller, more precisely by the absolute pitch and roll position of the pad. (Similar behavior would later be found in the Sony PlayStation 3 SIXAXIS line, introduced in 2006.) Games such as Motocross Madness (which was bundled with and designed for the controller) profited from this physical interaction. The left side of the controller features an eight-direction d-pad which function varies depending on which mode the controller is on.

The control pad had a total of ten digital fire buttons: six buttons controlled with the right thumb (named ABC XYZ), two shoulder buttons (one left, one right), and two buttons controlled with the left thumb, one named start, the other marked with a shift key symbol (as the SideWinder software allowed to use this button to shift controls for the ABC XYZ buttons — on the driver side, it was just an action button like the others).

A sensor button switched the control pad between analogue mode (green LED) and digital mode (red LED). In analogue mode, the x- and y-axis were controlled by the analogue controller movements, and the D-pad was used as a hat switch. In digital mode, the D-pad controlled the x- and y-axis like a traditional digital control pad (therefore, there was no hat switch function in digital mode).

Due to the release in 1998, at which time USB was just taking off, the Freestyle Pro supported both game port and USB connection. Without the adapter, the controller's cable ended in a game port plug. The sale box contained the game port-to-USB adapter for free.

=== Dual Strike ===
The Dual Strike, which debuted in 1999, was Microsoft's second notable venture into strange gamepad designs, following the Freestyle Pro. The Dual Strike attempted to blend both mouse and gamepad functions into a single unit. It was composed of two portions; there is a hinge between the two that allows the user to rotate the right side up and down and from side to side. The Dual Strike only supported USB.

=== Sidewinder 92626 ===
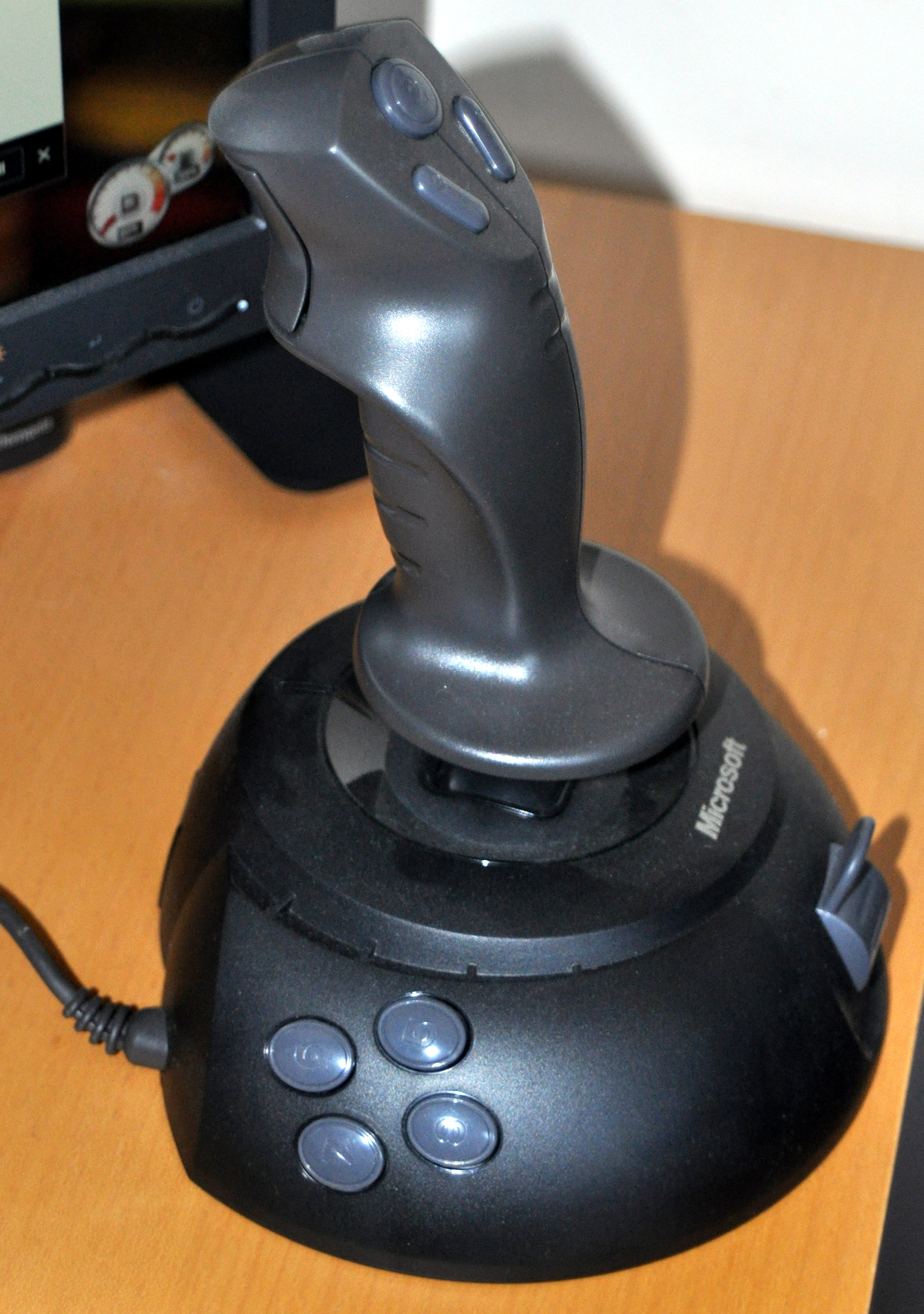
Microsoft Sidewinder with serial numbers beginning with 92626

This is similar to the Precision Pro and has a USB connection. Circa 2002. Serial numbers begin with 92626.

== Second generation ==
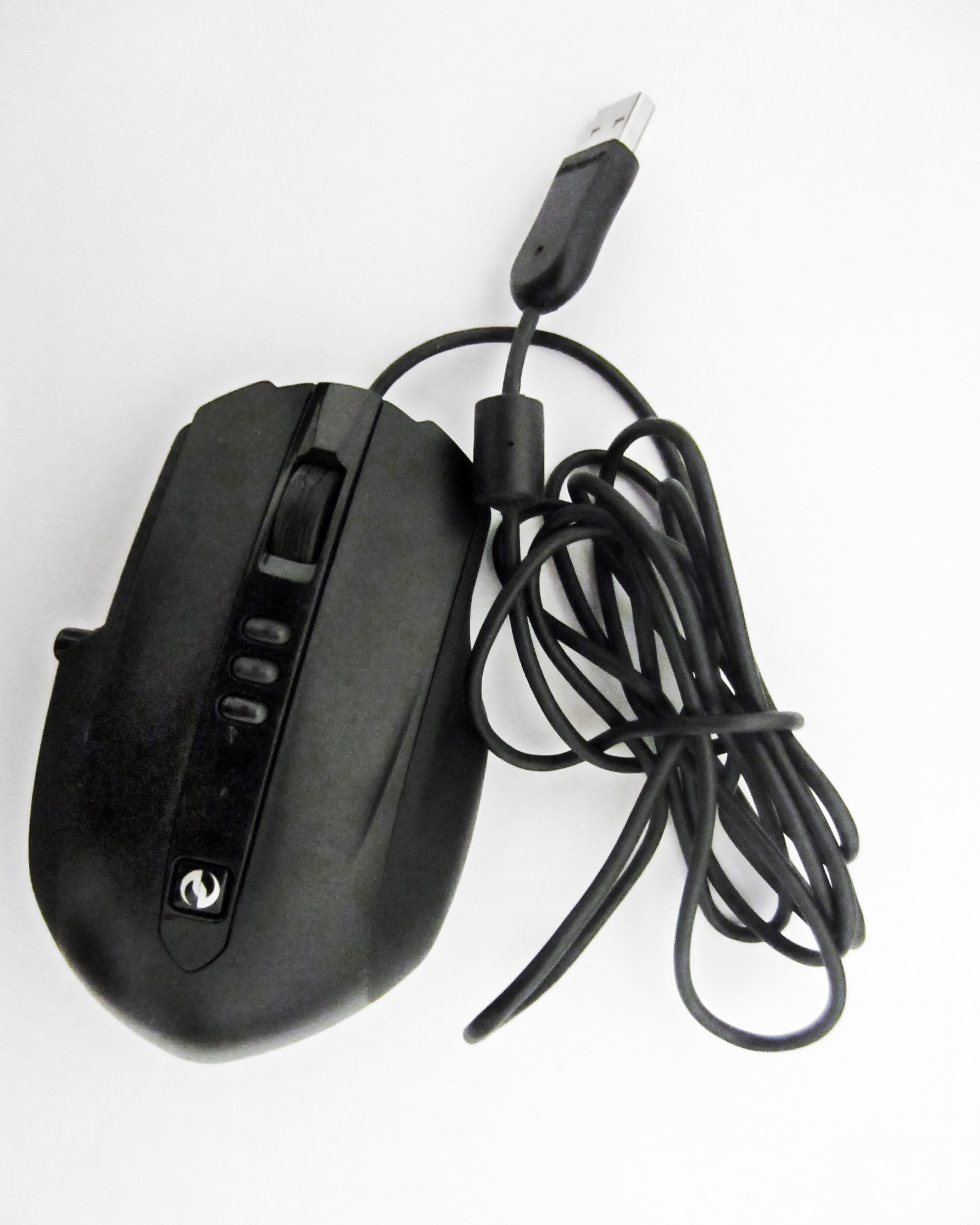
Microsoft Sidewinder X5 Mouse

In 2007, following a collaboration with Razer in creating the Microsoft Habu and Microsoft Reclusa, a gaming mouse and gaming keyboard sold under the plain Microsoft Hardware brand, Microsoft resurrected the SideWinder brand with an all-new SideWinder Mouse, designed from the ground up for high-end PC gaming. The design incorporated a number of advanced features including adjustable weights, programmable macro mode, on- the- fly DPI change, and a built-in LCD, the first ever found in a mouse.

In 2008, Microsoft also released the SideWinder X6 Gaming Keyboard, which is designed to be the keyboard counterpart of the Sidewinder Mouse. It features up to 30 programmable macro keys, volume control, media control, a detachable numpad and backlighting. Along with this keyboard a new mouse was released dubbed the SideWinder X5. The X5 has a more basic function set than its predecessor but was well received because of its lower price. Its shape is the same as the original but without the LCD, weight adjusting and metal side buttons. It also comes with a complete black design with red "LED Jets" on the back to make it stand out from the original and better fit the X6 keyboard.

In February 2009, Microsoft released another update to the SideWinder line, the SideWinder X8 gaming mouse. This new iteration incorporated new Microsoft BlueTrack tracking technology, intended to provide better tracking on non-standard surfaces. In addition, the mouse was made wireless, and the maximum DPI sensitivity was upped to 4000.

In March 2010, Microsoft released a second gaming keyboard, the Sidewinder X4. In comparison with the earlier X6, anti-ghosting technology was added. However, the detachable numpad was removed, and a numpad was instead attached permanently to the keyboard.

As of October 2014, Microsoft no longer offers any gaming mice or keyboards in the US.

== See also ==
- Microsoft ergonomic keyboards
- Xbox controller
- Xbox 360 controller
- Xbox Wireless Controller
