= The Cynic Project =

- Birth name: Alex Smith
- Also known as: The Cynic Project
- Origin: Stillwater, Minnesota
- Genres: Electronica, trance, balearic trance, ambient, chill-out
- Occupation(s): Electronic musician, composer, record producer, song writer, remixer,
- Instrument(s): Synthesizer, piano, Double bass
- Years active: 1999 – present
- Labels: Independent, Monstercat Silk
- Website: http://cynicmusic.com

The Cynic Project is the name of a predominantly trance project started in 1999 by American musician and producer Alex Smith. It is known for its uplifting melodies, as well as standard club beats. It rose in popularity with the upbringing of mp3.com in 2000, where it hosted its music, which was downloadable for free. Much of the earlier works were relatively short, considering trance standards. The project originally started as an experiment and developed into the high energy trance project it is today. During Smith's time with mp3.com, he worked with various artists that enhanced his sound and overall quality. Although the names of such people are unknown, they were very much involved with the creation and overall sound of songs such as Grid(Matrix), Eurodance Megamix, On Top of The World, and many others. His song Matrix ][ achieved six million downloads on mp3.com back in 1999.

Smith formerly lived at the University of Minnesota (Twin Cities Campus). He studied piano from grade school through high school with private teachers and also played the double bass. Creating electronic music using MIDI and MOD tracking software had been a hobby of his for years, but his music was never recorded or distributed until the summer of 1999. Smith is currently an instructor at DubSpot in New York, NY, where he educates on technique and style mass in music productions.

Smith began to earn significant profits from mp3.com's "payback for playback program." His dance track Matrix (now known as 'grid') hit #1 on the mp3.com music charts in November 1999. In December 1999, he was the top earner on the site, receiving $5,261 in profits, which mp3.com paid based on revenue from on-site advertising. Smith went on to build a home studio and started production on a CD. The first CD release, Soundscapes Sampler, was completed early in spring 2000. A Sidewinder single was released in the summer and Soundscapes 2000 was released in the fall of the same year.

Smith's inspiration for writing electronic music started when he heard Robert Miles' Children on vacation in Paris. He soon discovered the trance genre and cites several favorite artists including ATB, Ayla, BT, Ferry Corsten, Chicane, DJ Tiesto, Lange, DJ Sakin, Tomski, Rank 1, Energy 52, Kosmonova, and Solarstone.

One of his biggest hits, Grid ][ (Trance Mix), was originally known as Matrix ][. Mp3.com forced every artist to rename every song that contained a commercially dubious name, even though the song had the name before the first Matrix movie was known to the public.

On August 23, 2011, The Cynic Project released a self-titled album that is currently being sold at Amazon as a digital download. The album features 27 tracks and includes many of the best songs produced by The Cynic Project including Matrix ][ as track #5.

October 2015 The Cynic Project joined renown electronic record label, Silk Music. So far two singles have been released via Silk, 'Feel Me Wondering' with Blugazer (2015) and 'Waves On The Ocean' with Blugazer (2016).

== Discography ==
Soundscapes 2000; 1. Eurodance Megamix; 2. Start The Dance [Club Mix]; 3. Grid ][ [Trance Mix]; 4. Into The Night [Club 2000 Mix]; 5. Sidewinder; 6. Formant; 7. Beach Visions; 8. Lost In Paradise; 9. Liquid Images [Ambient Dub]; 10. After The Storm; 11. Trance Experience; 12. Tropical Destination; 13. Sidewinder [Ripsaw Mix]; 14. Red Horizon; 15. Cherry Earth; 16. On Top Of The World	Soundscapes Sampler; 1. Start The Dance [Eurodance Mix]; 2. Grid ][ [Trance Mix]; 3. Trance Generation; 4. Endless Palm; 5. Dream Formula [Raymond Wave Mix]; 6. Start The Dance [Trance Mix]; 7. Into The Night; 8. Dream Formula; 9. Another World; 10. Blue Cherry; 11. Liquid Images; 12. Church [Dance Mix]
Sidewinder Single; 1. Sidewinder; 2. Sidewinder [Raymond Wave Club Mix]; 3. Grid [Trance Mix]; 4. Formant; 5. Sidewinder [Rough Edit]; 6. Sidewinder [Route 909 DnB Edit]; 7. Sidewinder [Ripsaw Mix]	Mixed And Remixed Volume 1; 1. Trans Symphony; 2. Dreamin [Cynic Project Remix]; 3. Eurodance Megamix ][; 4. Red Horizon; 5. Sonar; 6. On Top Of The World; 7. Far From Home; 8. After The Storm [Dreams Mix]; 9. After The Storm [Club Mix]; 10. Beach Visions [Raymond Wave Club Mix]; 11. Beach Visions [Waves Remix]; 12. Warm Fuzzy; 13. Kirsten; 14. Sonar [Rough Mix]; 15. Waterfalls; 16. Waterfalls [Waves Edit]; 17. Danceparty; 18. A Cynical Christmas; 19. Bonk! [Rave Edit]; 20. Island Adventure
Mixed And Remixed Volume 2; 1. After The Storm [Raymond Wave Remix]; 2. After The Storm [Wellenrauch Remix]; 3. After The Storm [Zincaito Remix]; 4. Sidewinder [System Evolution Remix]; 5. Sidewinder [Raymond Wave Remix]; 6. Sidewinder [Raymond Wave Preliminary Mix]; 7. Grid [Route 909 Remix]; 8. Grid [Route 909 Remix Preliminary]; 9. Start The Dance [Technoloop Remix]; 10. Endless Palm [Raymond Wave Remix]; 11. Angels [Demo]; 12. Final Beat [Demo]; 13. Beyond Darkness [Demo]; 14. Experience [Demo]; 15. Canon in D [Silver Mix]	Mixed And Remixed Volume 3; 1. Falling (Preview featuring Jennifer Grimm); 2. Ocean [Fast]; 3. Ocean [Slow]; 4. DeLite; 5. DeLite [Dull Mix]; 6. Dreaming of Tomorrow; 7. After the Storm (Preview Dreams Mix feat. Jennifer Grimm); 8. Night; 9. Night [Preview Version]; 10. Night [Sagacity Vocal Dub]; 11. Structure; 12. Happy Theme; 13. Be a Star (feat. Nathan David Preview Version); 14. U Need To Connect; 15. Falling [Original Acoustic Mix]; 16. Drifting; 17. Sidewinder [Moe Happy Hardcore Mix]; 18. Dream Formula [Xiod Remix]; 19. Raymond Wave Remix Concept; 20. Matrix [Skr Team Remix]; 21. Start The Dance [Route 909 Remix]
After the Storm; 1. After the Storm (Alucard's Prairie of Rolling Thunder Remix); 2. After the Storm - Radio Rain Mix (original); 3. After the Storm - Radio Rain Mix (version); 4. After the Storm - Radio Rain Mix (club mix); 5. After the Storm - (Raymond Wave Remix); 6. After the Storm - (Wellenrausch Remix); 7. After the Storm - [club mix]; 8. After the Storm [Zincaito rmx]; 9. Falling - Memories of Tomorrow Trance Mix; 10. Falling - Alex's Vocal Edit	Cynic Project Favorites; 1. Grid ][ [Trance Mix]; 2. Red Horizon; 3. Beach Visions; 4. JP8080 [demo]; 5. Trance Experience [demo]; 6. Sidewinder [Raymond Wave Remix]; 7. Structure; 8. Night [preview version]; 9. Be a Star; 10. Let's Go; 11. Robot; 12. Wrecked; 13. Drifting; 14. Beyond Darkness [demo]; 15. On Top of the World feat Shelia
