= Xbox =

Video gaming brand owned by Microsoft

- Logo since 2026
- Product type: Video gaming
- Current owner: Microsoft (Xbox)
- Country: United States
- Introduced: November 15, 2001; 25 years ago
- Markets: Worldwide
- Registered as a trademark in: Worldwide
- Tagline: We are XBOX; Power Your Dreams; When everyone plays, we all win.
- Website: Official website

Xbox (stylized in all caps) is a video gaming brand that consists of four main home video game console lines, as well as the streaming service Xbox Cloud Gaming, and online services such as the Xbox network and Xbox Game Pass. The brand is owned by the namesake division of Microsoft.

The brand was first introduced in the United States in November 2001, with the launch of the original Xbox console. The Xbox branding was formerly, from 2012 to 2015, used as Microsoft's digital media entertainment brand replacing Zune. In 2022, Microsoft expanded its gaming business and reorganized Xbox to become part of its newly formed Microsoft Gaming division.

The original device was the first video game console offered by an American company after the Atari Jaguar stopped sales in 1996. It reached over 24 million units sold by May 2006. Microsoft's second console, the Xbox 360, was released in 2005 and has sold 86 million units as of October 2015. The third console, the Xbox One, was released in November 2013 and has sold 58 million units. The fourth line of Xbox consoles, the Xbox Series X and Series S, were released in November 2020. The head of Xbox is Asha Sharma, who succeeded former head Phil Spencer following his retirement in February 2026.

== History ==
Xbox consoles release timeline
2001	Xbox
2002–2004
2005	Xbox 360 (also known as Pro or Premium)
2005	Xbox 360 Core
2006
2007	Xbox 360 Arcade
2007	Xbox 360 Elite
2008–2009
2010	Xbox 360 S
2011–2012
2013	Xbox 360 E
2013	Xbox One
2014–2015
2016	Xbox One S
2017	Xbox One X
2018
2019	Xbox One S All-Digital Edition
2020	Xbox Series X
2020	Xbox Series S

When Sony Computer Entertainment first announced the PlayStation 2 in 1999, the company had positioned the console as a centerpiece for home entertainment, as it not only would play video games, but also could play audio CDs and video DVDs. Microsoft, whose business had been primarily in supporting the personal computer (PC) business with its Windows operating system, software, and games, saw the PlayStation 2 as a threat to the personal computer.

Four engineers from Microsoft's DirectX team—Kevin Bachus, Seamus Blackley, Ted Hase and DirectX team leader Otto Berkes, began to envision what a Microsoft console to compete against the PlayStation 2 would be like. They designed a system that would use many hardware components in common with PCs, effectively running a version of Windows and DirectX to power the games on the console. This approach would make it easy for developers on Windows to build games for their new system, differentiating itself from the custom hardware solutions of most consoles. Numerous names were suggested for this console, including "Direct X Box", and the "Windows Entertainment Project". Microsoft's marketing team conducted consumer surveys of the name, using the name "Xbox" as a control believing this would be least desirable, but found that this had the highest preference from their tests, and was selected as the name of the console.

=== Future ===
Microsoft has been working to leverage the branding of "Xbox" beyond the console hardware but as a general video game brand, reflected in the renaming of Microsoft Studios to Xbox Game Studios in 2019. Phil Spencer stated in June 2019 that for Microsoft, "The business isn't how many consoles you sell. The business is how many players are playing the games that they buy, how they play." which journalists have taken as a route to de-emphasize console hardware and prioritize games, subscriptions and services for players. Later in February 2020, Spencer said that moving forward, the company does not see "traditional gaming companies" like Nintendo and Sony as their competitors but instead those that offer cloud computing services such as Amazon and Google. Spencer identified that Microsoft Azure is a major component of their plans going forward, which powers its Xbox Cloud Gaming game streaming service. Spencer also cited mobile gaming as a potential area, and where Microsoft was trying to position itself with its services should this become the more preferred form for gaming. Spencer said "I don't think it's "hardware agnostic" as much as it's 'where you want to play'", in describing how Microsoft was strategizing the Xbox branding for the future.

Microsoft announced in June 2025 that it was partnering with AMD to produce the next generation of Xbox hardware, which could take on a range of device types including consoles and computers. Amid industry rumors that Microsoft was abandoning hardware in favor of game development that emerged around Google in October 2025, Xbox president Sarah Bond confirmed they had already started development work for the next console.

On May 13, 2026, Asha Sharma posted a poll on X (formerly Twitter) to determine whether the Xbox brand moving forward should be displayed with capitalization ("Xbox") or with all capitals ("XBOX"). After thousands of votes were cast, "XBOX" became the clear majority, and two days later, on May 15, Xbox updated their X account's name to display in all capitals. At the time, it was unclear if the rebrand would affect Xbox as a whole or be limited only to its social networking accounts.

== Prototypes ==
=== Alpha prototypes ===
Image of the Xbox Alpha II

Around 1999, Xbox made their first prototype, named the Alpha II. It was a debug and development kit for the original Xbox built inside a standard silver desktop PC for its time. While not much is known about this, this prototype was revealed to the public by original Xbox creator Seamus Blackley. It's basically shaped like a silver PC and written on it was "Xbox development kit". The centre shows a green X logo, with the below having a small engraving that spelled its name. Two Alpha prototypes were ever made, the Alpha I and Alpha II.

=== Big X ===
In March 2000 at the Game Developers Conference, Xbox would reveal the original but scrapped Xbox prototype. The prototype was codenamed the DirectX Box and was made out of pure aluminum. An illuminated green X was shown in the centre. However, each unit would cost $18K-$36K to make individually and Microsoft preferred a cheaper model to make.

== Consoles ==
=== First generation: Xbox ===
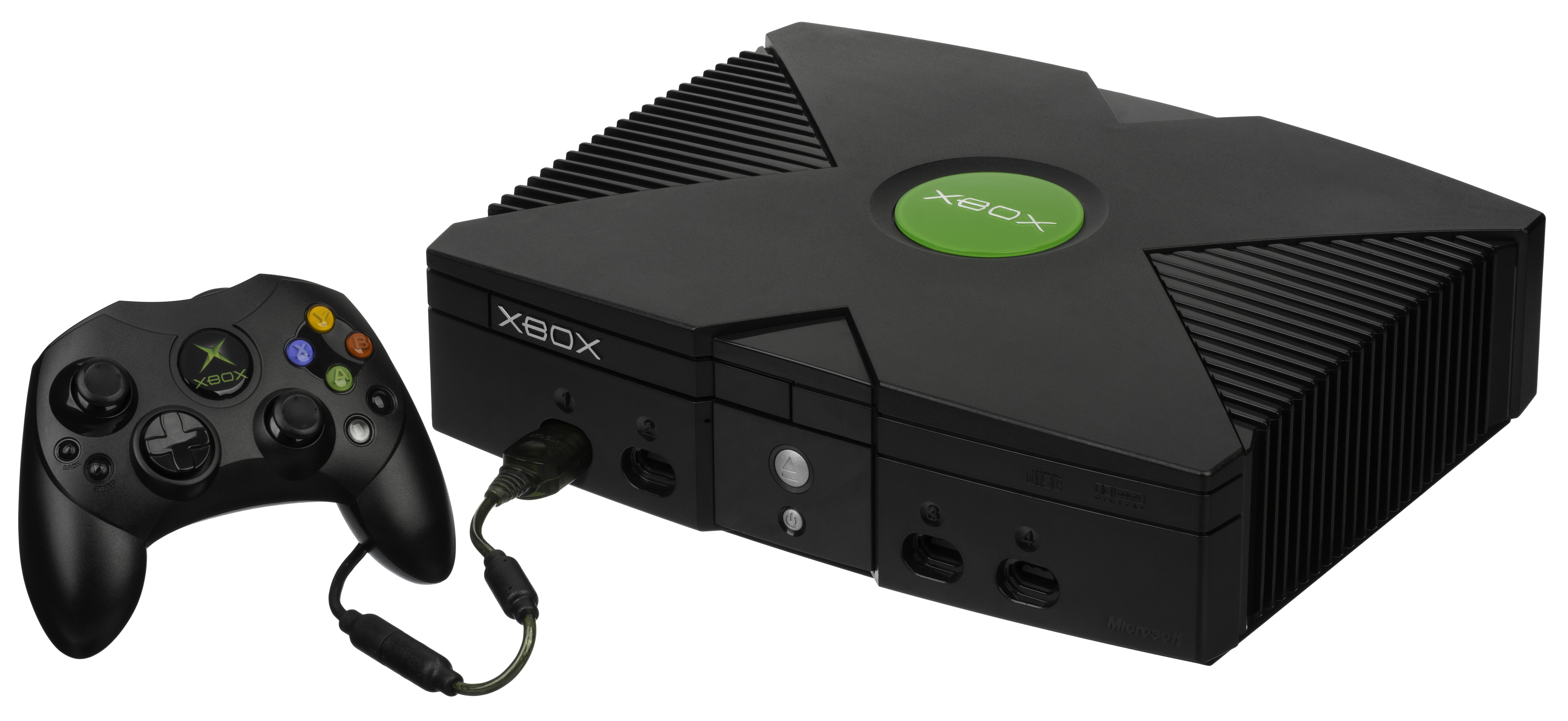
Xbox console with "Controller S"

The original Xbox was released in North America on November 15, 2001, in Japan on February 22, 2002, and in Australia and Europe on March 14, 2002, marking Microsoft's debut in the gaming console market. As part of the sixth generation of video game consoles, the Xbox competed with Sony's PlayStation 2, Sega's Dreamcast (which stopped American sales before the Xbox went on sale), and Nintendo's GameCube. Built around a 733 MHz 32-bit Intel Pentium III CPU and a 233 MHz Nvidia GeForce 3-based NV2A GPU with 64 MB of memory, the Xbox was the first console offered by an American company after the Atari Jaguar stopped sales in 1996. Its name was derived from a contraction of DirectX Box, a reference to Microsoft's graphics API, DirectX.

The integrated Xbox Live service launched in November 2002 allowed players to play games online with a broadband connection. It first competed with Dreamcast's online service but later primarily competed with PlayStation 2's online service. Although the two competing services were free, while Xbox Live required a subscription—as well as broadband-only connection, which was not completely adopted yet—Xbox Live was a success due to it having better servers, features such as a buddy list, and milestone titles such as Halo 2 (released in November 2004), which became the best-selling Xbox video game and was by far the most popular online game for the original Xbox system.

=== Second generation: Xbox 360 ===
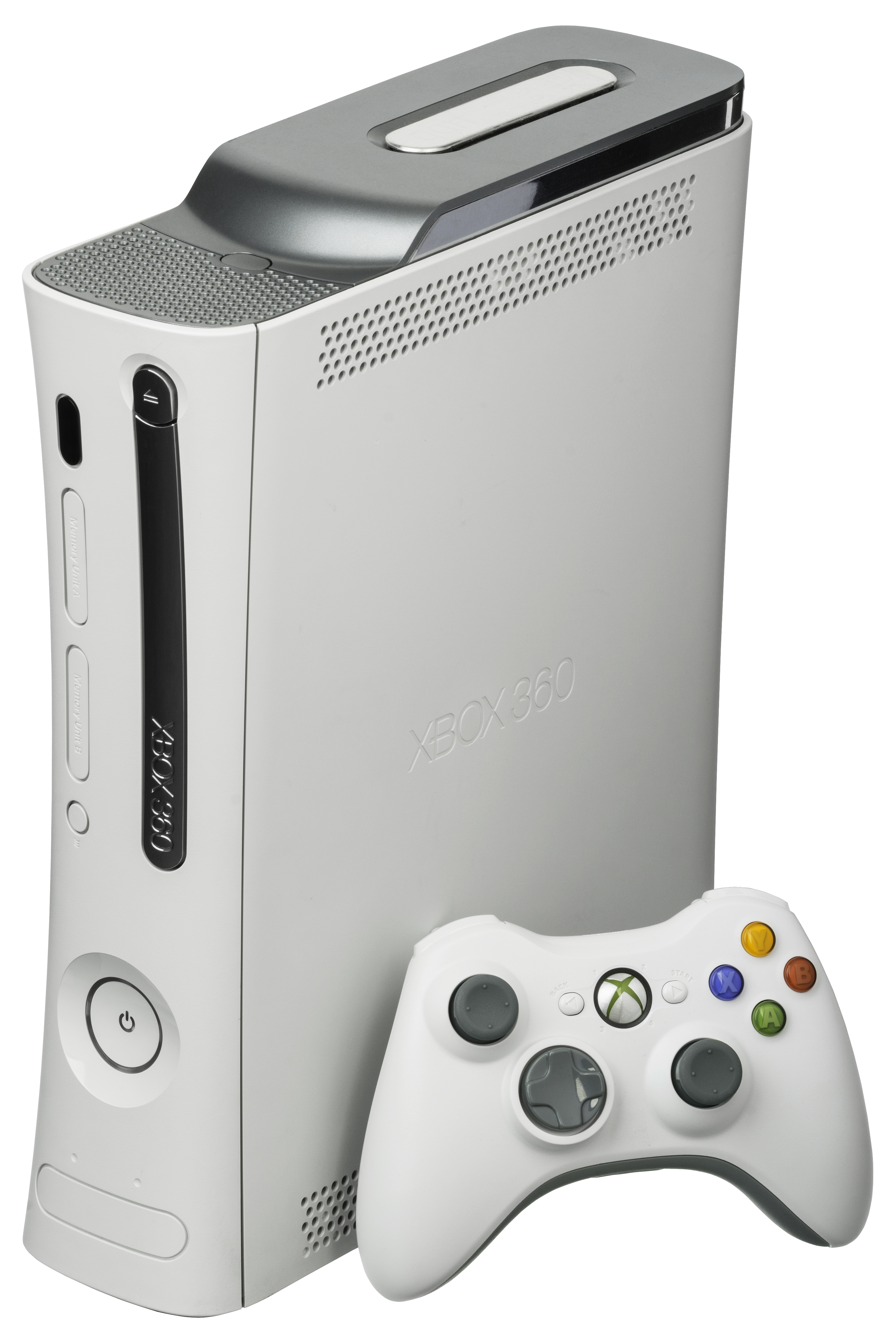
Original Xbox 360

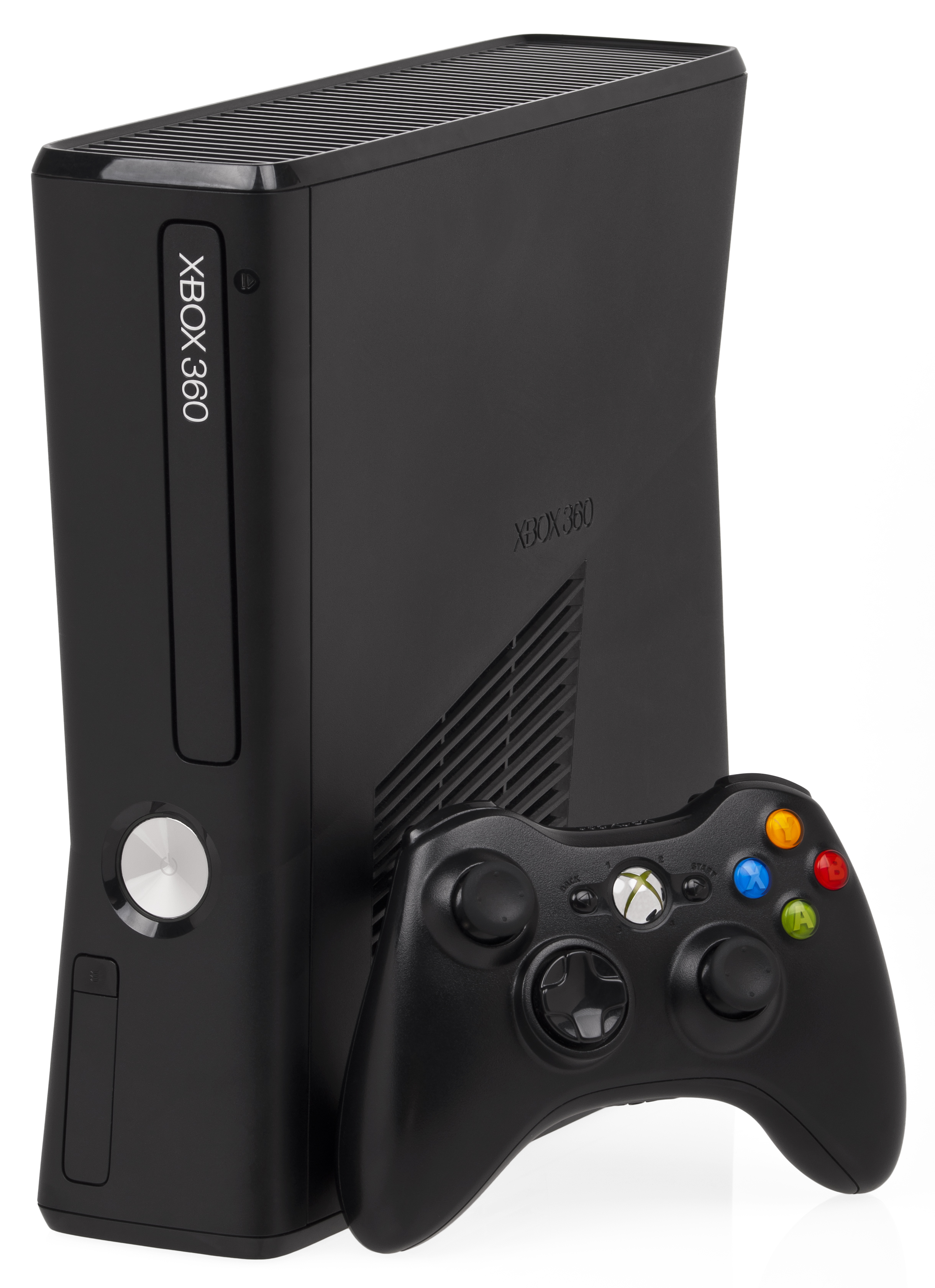
Xbox 360 S

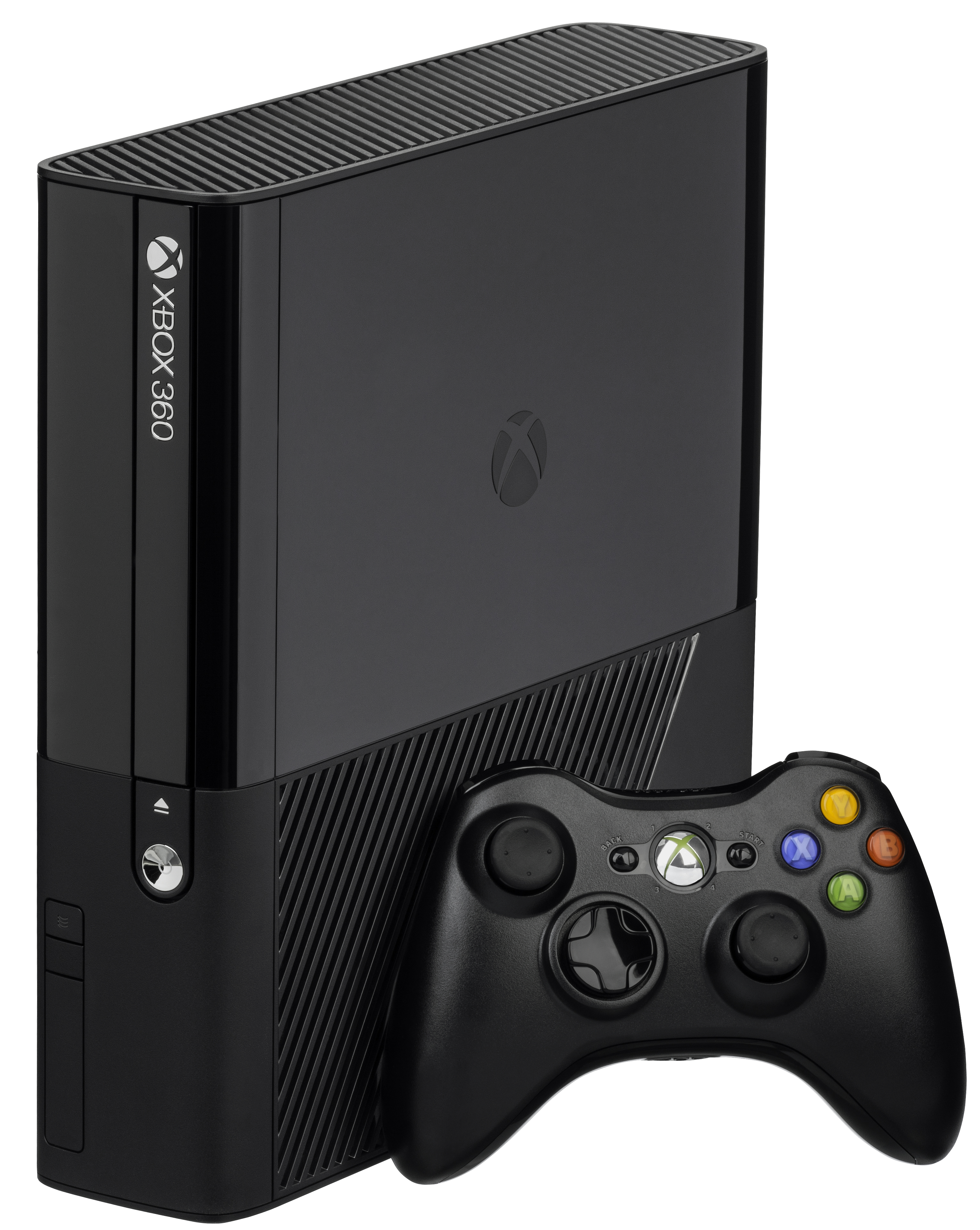
Xbox 360 E

The Xbox 360 was released as the successor of the original Xbox in November 2005, competing with Sony's PlayStation 3 and Nintendo's Wii as part of the seventh generation of video game consoles. It featured a custom triple-core 64-bit PowerPC-based processor design by IBM with 512 MB of RAM memory. As of June 2014, 84 million Xbox 360 consoles have been sold worldwide. The Xbox 360 was officially unveiled on MTV on May 12, 2005, with detailed launch and game information divulged later that month at the Electronic Entertainment Expo (E3). The console sold out completely upon release in all regions except in Japan. Several retail configurations of the core Xbox 360 model were offered over its lifetime, varying the amount of RAM and internal storage offered.

The Xbox 360 showed an expanded Xbox Live service (which now included a limited "Free" tier called Silver), the ability to stream multimedia content from PCs, while later updates added the ability to purchase and stream music, television programs, and films through the Xbox Music and Xbox Video services, along with access to third-party content services through third-party media streaming applications. Microsoft also released Kinect, a motion control system for the Xbox 360 which uses an advanced sensor system.

Two major revisions of the Xbox 360 were released following the initial launch. The Xbox 360 S (typically considered as "Slim"), launched in 2010, featured the same core hardware but with a redesigned, slimmer form factor with a smaller-sized 250 GB hard drive. It also added integrated 802.11 b/g/n Wi-Fi, TOSLINK S/PDIF optical audio output, five USB 2.0 ports (compared to the three from older versions) and a special port designed for the Kinect peripheral. The Xbox 360 S replaced the base Xbox 360 unit, which was discontinued, and sold at the same price. A cheaper Xbox 360 S unit, removing the 250 GB drive while adding 4 GB of internal storage, was released later in 2010; the unit allowed users to hook up an external storage solution or purchase a 250 GB internal add-on.

The second major revision of the Xbox 360 was the Xbox 360 E, released in 2013. It featured a case style similar to the upcoming Xbox One, and eliminated one USB port and the S/PDIF, YPbPr component and S-video connections, but otherwise shared the same specifications as the Xbox 360 S.

=== Third generation: Xbox One ===
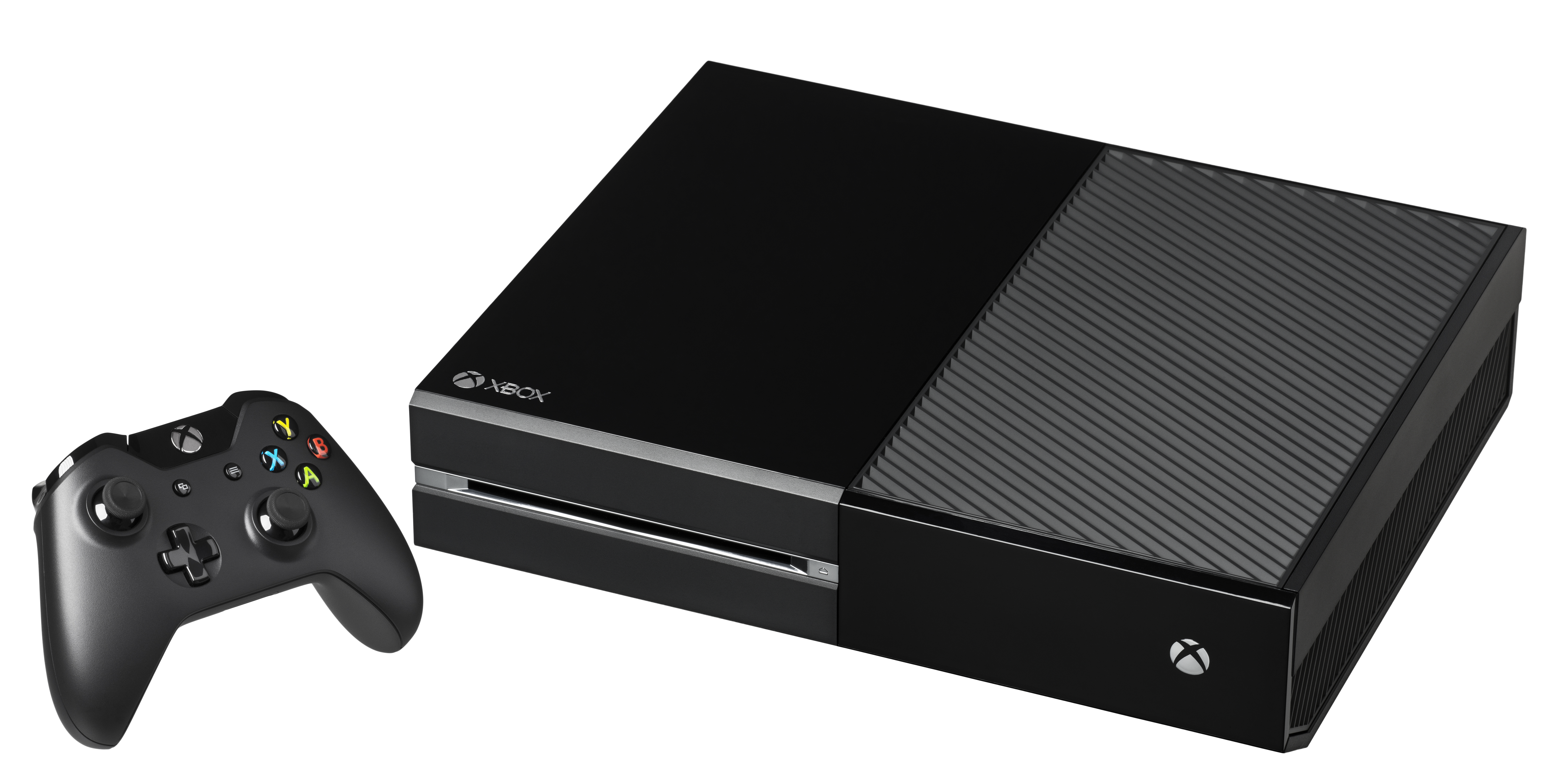
Original Xbox One

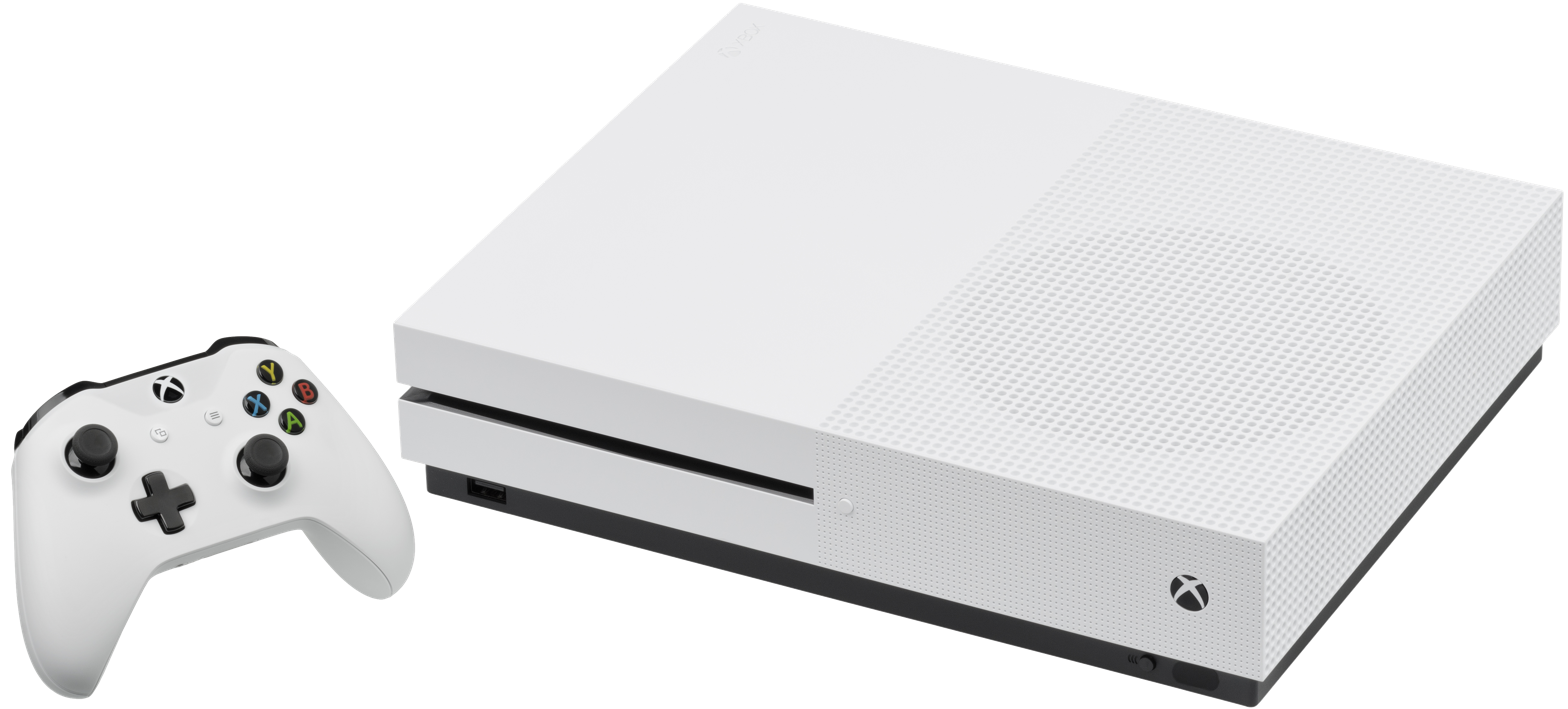
Xbox One S

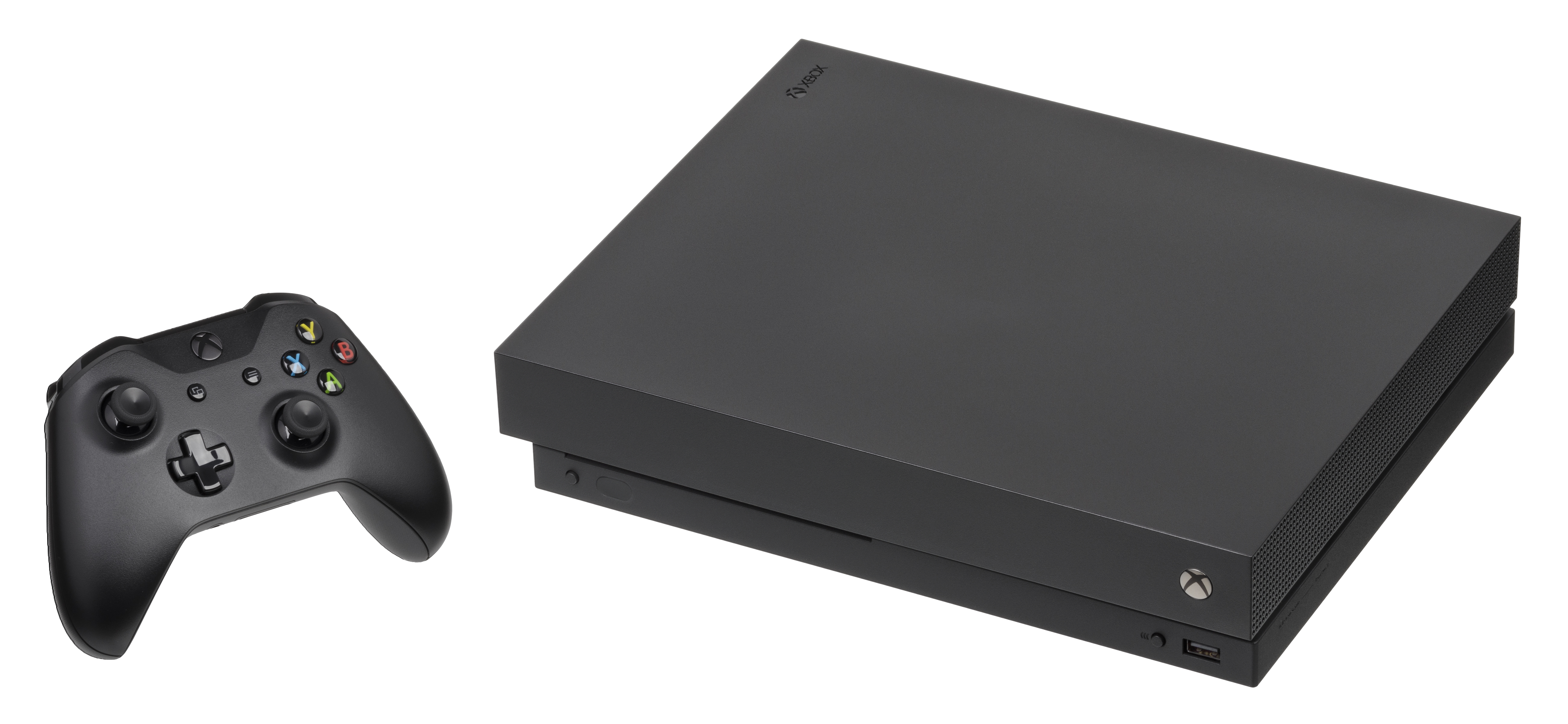
Xbox One X

The Xbox One was released on November 22, 2013, in North America, as the successor to the Xbox 360. The Xbox One competed with Sony's PlayStation 4 and Nintendo's Wii U and Switch as part of the eighth generation of video game consoles. It features an AMD Accelerated Processing Unit (APU) built around the 64-bit x86-64 instruction set and can come with up to 12 GB of memory.

Announced on May 21, 2013, the Xbox One has an emphasis on internet-based features, including the ability to record and stream gameplay, and the ability to integrate with a set-top box to watch cable or satellite TV through the console with an enhanced guide interface and Kinect-based voice control.

Following its unveiling, the Xbox One proved controversial for its original digital rights management and privacy practices; while Microsoft touted the ability for users to access their library of games (regardless of whether they were purchased physically or digitally) on any Xbox One console without needing their discs, and the ability to share their entire library with 10 designated "family" members, all games would have to be tied to the user's Xbox Live account and their Xbox One console, and the console would be required to connect to the Internet on a periodic basis (at least once every 24 hours) to synchronize the library, or else the console would be unable to play any games at all. After an overwhelmingly negative response from critics and consumers (who also showed concerns that the system could prevent or hinder the resale of used games), Microsoft announced that these restrictions would be dropped. Microsoft was also criticized for requiring the Xbox One to have its updated Kinect peripheral plugged in to function, which critics and privacy advocates believed could be used as a surveillance device. As a gesture toward showing a commitment to user privacy, Microsoft decided to allow the console to function without Kinect.

On June 13, 2016, Microsoft announced the Xbox One S at E3 2016, which featured a smaller form factor, as well as support for 4K video (including streaming and Ultra HD Blu-ray) and HDR. At E3 2017, Microsoft unveiled Xbox One X, a high-end model with improved hardware designed to facilitate the playing of games at 4K resolution.

In November 2014, Microsoft stated it would not release sales numbers for the Xbox One line. Xbox head Phil Spencer said that while they do internally track sales figures, they do not want their developers to be focused on these numbers as to affect their products, and thus have opted not to report further sales of Xbox hardware going forward. In July 2023, Microsoft revealed that the Xbox One line sold over 58 million units.

=== Fourth generation: Xbox Series X and Series S ===
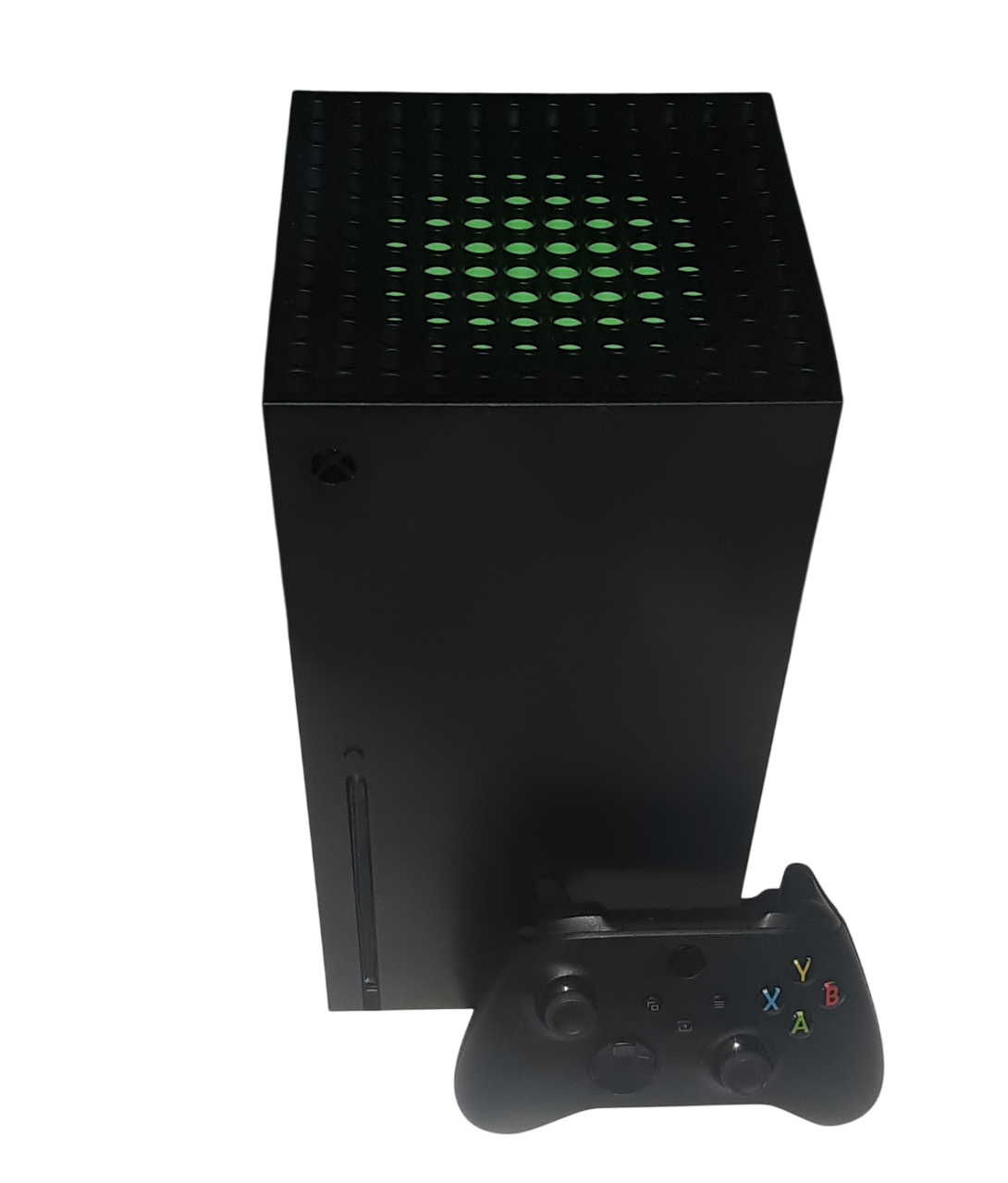
Xbox Series X

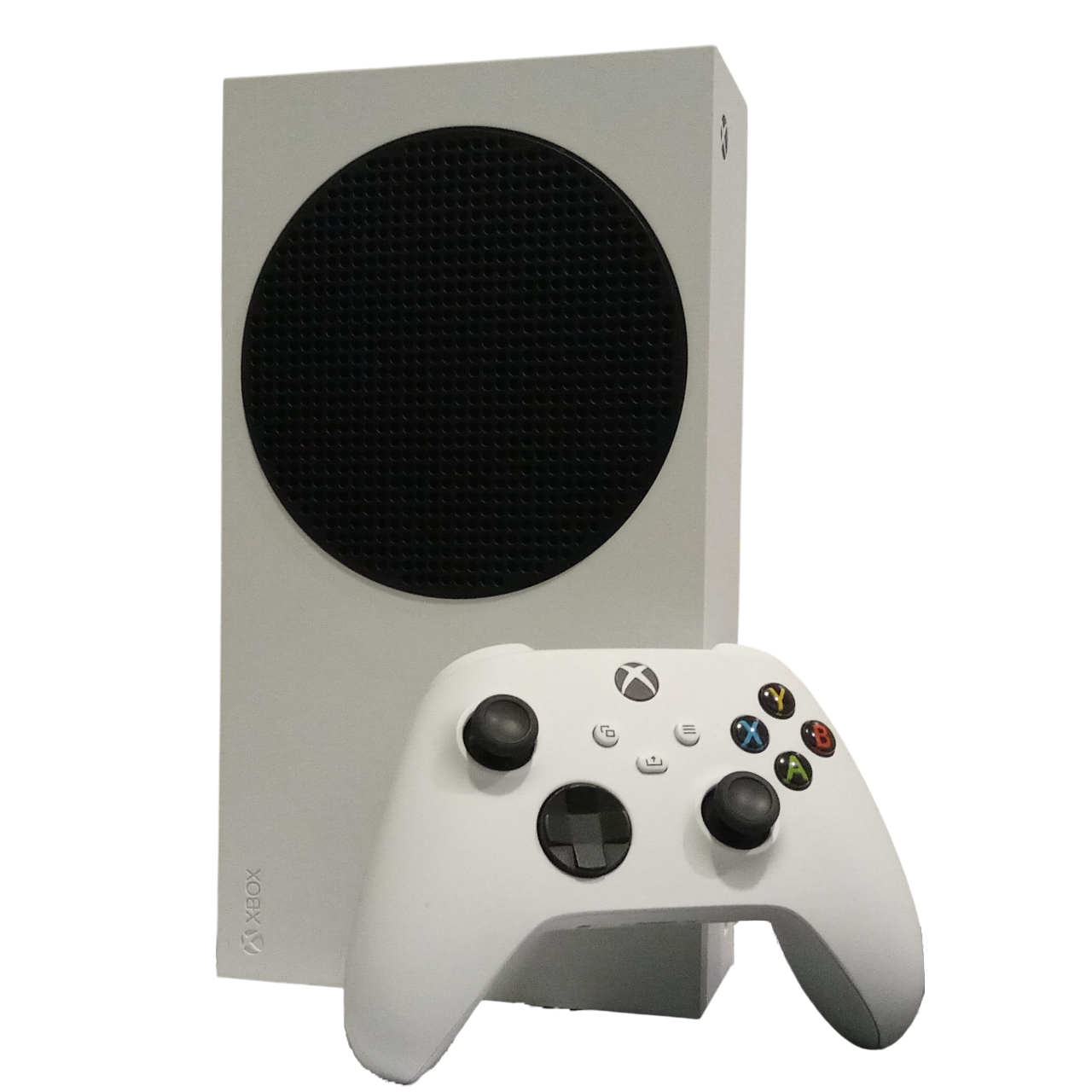
Xbox Series S

The fourth generation of Xbox models, simply named Xbox, includes the Xbox Series X and Xbox Series S that launched on November 10, 2020. Both are considered members of the ninth generation of video game consoles alongside the PlayStation 5, also released that month. Like the Xbox One, the consoles use an AMD 64-bit x86-64 CPU and GPU with up to 16 GB of memory.

The Xbox Series X and Series S are high-end and low-end versions comparable to the Xbox One X and Xbox One S models, respectively, with all games designed for this model family playable on both systems. The Xbox Series X is estimated to be four times as powerful as Xbox One X, with support for 8K resolution and up to 120 frames-per-second rendering, with a nominal target of 4K resolution at 60 frames per second. The Xbox Series S is a digital-only unit with less graphic processing power, but can still render at a nominal 1440p resolution at 60 frames per second with support for 4K upscaling. Both consoles features support for new graphics rendering systems including real-time ray-tracing, and the new Xbox Velocity Architecture that works with the internal SSD drive to maximize the rate of texture streaming to the graphics processor, among other features. Besides games for this new console family, both consoles are fully compatible with all Xbox One games and most hardware, as well as all backward compatible games that were playable on the Xbox One from the Xbox 360 and original Xbox console.

To help transition consumers, Microsoft introduced its Smart Delivery system which most of its first-party games and several third-party games would use to offer free updates to Xbox One versions of games to the Xbox Series X/S version over the first few years of the consoles' launch.

In the latter half of the console's timeframe, the effects of global tariffs and RAM shortage led to price increases of both the Xbox Series X and Series S consoles since 2025. According to Windows Central, Microsoft was losing hundreds of dollars on each console sold as they had not secured enough computer hardware supply before the RAM shortage.

=== Fifth generation: Project Helix ===
Microsoft’s fifth generation of Xbox hardware is tied to a broader strategy of treating "Xbox" as a gaming platform and brand beyond just physical consoles. In 2019, Microsoft Studios was renamed Xbox Game Studios, reflecting a shift in focus toward games, subscriptions and services rather than solely hardware sales. Phil Spencer said in June 2019 that Xbox's success was measured by how many players played its games and used its services, not by unit sales.

In February 2020, Spencer said Microsoft did not view traditional console manufacturers as its main competitors, but instead saw cloud computing providers as critical competitors, with Microsoft Azure powering Xbox Cloud Gaming and related services.

In February 2024, Phil Spencer reiterated Microsoft's commitment to Xbox console hardware, stating that first-party games would continue to launch "first and foremost" on Xbox platforms and that Microsoft planned to publicly discuss its next generation of hardware later in 2024.

In June 2025, Microsoft announced a strategic partnership with AMD to co-engineer silicon for the next generation of Xbox hardware across a range of devices, including future consoles and cloud infrastructure. Amid industry speculation about Microsoft's long-term hardware plans, Xbox president Sarah Bond confirmed that development had begun on the next Xbox console.

As of 2026, Microsoft has not announced a release date for its next-generation Xbox hardware; Phil Spencer stated that the timing remains undecided, and earlier leaked FTC documents had indicated a 2028 timeframe, which Microsoft later described as based on outdated plans, although reporting citing AMD CEO Lisa Su has suggested that a 2027 launch is possible.

The codename for the next Xbox, Project Helix, was announced in March 2026. The console is expected to support both Xbox and Windows games, with more information planned at the Game Developers Conference. Xbox's Chief Strategy Officer, Matthew Ball, stated that the global memory supply shortage and price increases due to AI data center demands may have a long-term effect on the production of Helix. Sharma said that with the rising costs of components, the industry has "reached a point where it will be hard to imagine" mass market consoles costing thousands of dollars, and for Xbox, they will need to develop "radically different business models" to make their consoles available to more consumers, though still plan for the larger vision of Project Helix. The estimated cost of Helix based on October 2026 prices and without any subsidy ranged from $1200 to $1800. An internal memo from Sharma in June 2026 indicated that Microsoft was likely planning to release the console in late 2027.

=== Comparison ===
The following table is a comparison of the four generations of Xbox hardware.

Xbox generation	First	Second	Third			Fourth	
	Xbox	Xbox 360	Xbox One	Xbox One S	Xbox One X	Xbox Series S	Xbox Series X
Console	Original Xbox	Xbox 360					
Console launch price	US$299.99		US$499.99 (with Kinect); US$399.99 (without Kinect)	US$299.99 (Xbox One S); US$249.99 (Xbox One S All-Digital Edition)	US$499.99	US$299.99	US$499.99
Release date	NA: November 15, 2001; JP: February 22, 2002; EU: March 14, 2002	NA: November 22, 2005; EU: December 2, 2005; JP: December 10, 2005; AU: March 23, 2006; Further information: Xbox 360 launch#Release dates and pricing	November 22, 2013	Xbox One S: August 2, 2016; Xbox One S All-Digital Edition: May 7, 2019	November 7, 2017	November 10, 2020	
Discontinued	JP: June 4, 2006; NA: March 2, 2009; EU: March 11, 2007	WW: April 20, 2016	WW: August 2, 2016	WW: July 16, 2020 (Xbox One S All-Digital Edition); WW: Q4 2020 (Xbox One S)	WW: July 16, 2020	—N/a	—N/a
Units sold (Note: Starting with the Xbox One, Microsoft does not release detailed sales figures of its Xbox hardware sales, so all figures provided are based on industry analysis estimates. Xbox's head Phil Spenser said that they do not want their teams to be focused on sales numbers so have opted not to report them and do not plan to for the foreseeable future.)	24+ million (as of May 10, 2006)	84+ million (as of June 9, 2014)(details)	58 million (as of June 30, 2023)			21 million (as of June 30, 2023)	
Best-selling game	Halo 2, 8 million (as of May 9, 2006)	Kinect Adventures! (pack-in with Kinect peripheral), 24 million Best-selling non-bundled game: Grand Theft Auto V, 22.95 million	Grand Theft Auto V (as of November 5, 2018)			—N/a	—N/a
Media	CD, DVD	CD, DVD, HD DVD (movies only) with add-on drive, USB Drive with supported media, DLNA Servers	CD, DVD, Blu-ray Disc, USB Drive with supported media, DLNA Servers	CD, DVD, Blu-ray Disc, UHD Blu-ray Disc, USB Drive with supported media, DLNA Servers		USB Drive with supported media, DLNA Servers	CD, DVD, Blu-ray Disc, UHD Blu-ray Disc, USB Drive with supported media, DLNA Servers
Accessories (retail)	Xbox Live Starter Kit; Xbox Media Center Extender; DVD Playback Kit; Xbox Music Mixer; Memory Unit (8 MB); *Logitech Wireless Controller (2.4 GHz): More...	Kinect; Wireless Gaming Receiver; Play & Charge Kit; See Xbox 360 accessories	Xbox Wireless Controller; Kinect; Media Remote; Stereo Headset Adapter; Official Stereo Headset; Digital TV Tuner (EU Only); Play and Charge Kit; See Xbox One accessories			Xbox Wireless Controller; Rechargeable Battery + USB-C Cable; See Xbox One accessories	
CPU	733 MHz x86 Intel Celeron/Pentium III Custom Hybrid CPU	3.2 GHz IBM PowerPC tri-core CPU codenamed "Xenon"	1.75 GHz AMD x86-64 eight-core CPU codenamed "Jaguar"		2.3 GHz semi-custom AMD x86-64 eight-core CPU code named "Jaguar Enhanced"	3.6 GHz custom AMD Zen 2 eight-core CPU	3.8 GHz custom AMD Zen 2 eight-core CPU
GPU	233 MHz Nvidia custom GeForce 3 NV2A DirectX 8.0 based GPU	500 MHz ATi custom Radeon X1800 DirectX 9.0c based GPU codenamed "Xenos"	853 MHz AMD Radeon HD 7000 series DirectX 11.1, DirectX 12 based GPU codenamed "Durango" with 12 compute units	914 MHz AMD Radeon HD 7000 series DirectX 11.1, DirectX 12 based GPU codenamed "Edmonton" with 12 compute units	1172 MHz AMD GCN DirectX 11.1, DirectX 12 based GPU codenamed "Scorpio" with 40 compute units	1550 MHz AMD Custom RDNA 2 DirectX 12 based GPU with 20 compute units	1825 MHz AMD Custom RDNA 2 DirectX 12 based GPU with 52 compute units
Memory	64 MB DDR SDRAM @ 200 MHz 6.4 GB/s	512 MB of GDDR3 RAM @ 700 MHz 22.4 GB/s, 10 MB EDRAM GPU frame buffer memory	8 GB of DDR3 RAM @ 2133 MHz 68.3 GB/s, 32 MB ESRAM GPU frame buffer memory		12 GB of GDDR5 RAM @ 6.8 GHz 326 GB/s	10 GB of GDDR6 RAM: 8 GB @ 244 GB/s, 2 GB @ 56 GB/s	16 GB of GDDR6 RAM; 10 GB @ 560 GB/s, 6 GB @ 336 GB/s
Video I/O ports	VGA; Component (YPbPr); SCART; S-Video; Composite	HDMI 1.1 (on models manufactured after August 2007); VGA; Component/D-Terminal (YPbPr); SCART RGB; S-Video; Composite	HDMI 1.4b Input, Output	HDMI 1.4b Input, HDMI 2.0a Output	HDMI 1.4b Input, HDMI 2.0b Output	HDMI 2.1 Output	
Video resolution and features	1080i, 720p, 576p, 576i, 480p, 480i	1080p, 1080i, 720p, 576p, 576i, 480p, 480i; Various monitor resolutions available via VGA and HDMI/DVI (640×480, 848×480, 1024×768, 1280×720, 1280×768, 1280×1024, 1360×768, 1440×900, 1680×1050 & 1920×1080)	1080p@60fps, 720p@60fps (does not support any interlaced resolutions)	4K@60fps, 1440p@60fps (up to 120fps), 1080p@60fps (up to 120fps), 720p@60fps (does not support any interlaced resolutions); HDR10 for games and media; Dolby Vision for media; AMD FreeSync		1440p@60fps (up to 120fps), 1080p@120fps, 720p@120fps; HDR10/HDR10+/Dolby Vision for games and media; AMD FreeSync	8K@60fps, 4K@60fps (up to 120fps), 1440p@120fps, 1080p@120fps, 720p@120fps; HDR10/HDR10+/Dolby Vision for games and media; AMD FreeSync
Video codecs supported		WMV (unprotected); MPEG-4; H.264; AVI	3GP video, 3GP2; AVI DivX, DV AVI, AVI uncompressed, asf, AVI Xvid; H.264 AVCHD, H.264 AVC, H.264 ASP; M-JPEG; .mkv, .mov; MPEG-PS, MPEG-2, MPEG-2 HD, MPEG-2 TS; WMV, WMV HD			—N/a	—N/a
Audio I/O	Optical TOSLINK; Stereo RCA	HDMI 1.1 (on models manufactured after August 2007); Optical Toslink; Stereo RCA	HDMI 1.4b Input, Output; Optical Toslink	HDMI 1.4b Input, HDMI 2.0a Output; Optical Toslink	HDMI 1.4b Input, HDMI 2.0b Output; Optical Toslink	HDMI 2.1 Output	
Audio formats and features	dts; Dolby Digital Live, Dolby Digital, Dolby Surround; Stereo	dts; Dolby Digital, Dolby Surround; Stereo	dts-HD Master Audio, dts-HD High Resolution Audio, dts:X, dts; Dolby Atmos, Dolby TrueHD, Dolby Digital Plus, Dolby Digital; Auro-3D; Stereo			—N/a	—N/a
Audio codecs supported		AAC; MP3; WMA, WMA Lossless, WMA Pro	3GP audio; AAC; ADTS; MP3; WAV; WMA, WMA Lossless, WMA Pro, WMA Voice			—N/a	—N/a
Online service	Xbox Live (2002–10); XLink Kai (2003–present)	Xbox Live; Xbox Live Arcade; Xbox Live Marketplace; Xbox Live Vision (webcam), headset Xbox Live Video Marketplace; Windows Live Messenger; Internet Explorer; VideoKinect (Kinect sensor is no longer needed)	Xbox Live; Xbox Store; Microsoft Store; Internet Explorer; Microsoft Edge; Skype	Xbox Live; Xbox Store; Microsoft Store; Microsoft Edge; Skype			
Backward compatibility	—N/a	50% of Xbox Library	Select Xbox 360 and Xbox titles			All Xbox One Games; Select Xbox 360 and Xbox titles	
System software	Xbox Music Mixer; DVD Playback Kit, Xbox Linux	See Xbox 360 system software	See Xbox One system software				
System software features	Audio CD playback; DVD playback (with the playback kit)	Audio CD playback; DVD playback; HD-DVD playback (with optional add-on); Audio file playback (non-DRM AAC, MP3, WMA); Video file playback (MPEG4, WMV, DivX, XviD); Image slideshows; Connectivity with Windows PCs for more codec support and external playback (compatible natively with Windows XP Media Center Edition and Windows Vista, with Windows XP with downloadable utility)	Audio CD playback; DVD playback; Blu-ray playback; 3D Blu-ray playback; DLNA server support; External hard drive support	Audio CD playback; DVD playback; Blu-ray playback; 3D Blu-ray playback; UHD Blu-ray playback; DLNA server support; External hard drive (HD) support		DLNA server support; External hard drive (HD) support	Audio CD playback; DVD playback; Blu-ray playback; 3D Blu-ray playback; UHD Blu-ray playback; DLNA server support; External hard drive (HD) support
Consumer programmability	Via Softmods and/or modchips; Modified Windows CE 2.x, Linux.	Development on PC with XNA Game Studio ($99/year subscription, binary distribution with XNA 1.0 Refresh).	ID@Xbox and approved Microsoft Store; UWP apps.				

=== Other devices ===
At the June 2025 Xbox Showcase, Microsoft revealed the Asus ROG Xbox Ally and ROG Xbox Ally X handheld devices, which run Windows and support Xbox games alongside other PC storefronts, planned for release by the end of 2025. The Verge reported that Microsoft previously explored an internally developed handheld before focusing on the ROG Ally partnership.

== Games ==
Xbox Game Studios logo, one of three publishing arms of parent company Xbox (formerly Microsoft Gaming)

Each console has a variety of games. Most games released on the original Xbox are backwards compatible and can be played directly on its successor, Xbox 360. Backward compatibility with Xbox 360 titles was added to Xbox One a year-and-a-half after its launch in June 2015, with specific titles requiring Kinect or USB peripherals not being supported. The Xbox Series X/S supports backward compatibility with all Xbox One titles (except for Kinect-required games), as well as all the Xbox 360 and original Xbox titles that were made available for Xbox One.

Games using the Xbox and Xbox Live brands have also been released for Microsoft Windows, Windows Phone, Android, and iOS devices. Xbox games can also be played using the Xbox Cloud Gaming streaming service.

== Services ==
Microsoft has used the razor and blades model to sell the family of Xbox consoles, selling the console at or below the price of its manufacturing costs, while earning revenue from licensing fees it collects from publishers, developers and from its services offered to players.

=== Xbox network ===
Xbox network (formerly known as Xbox Live) is an online service with over 65 million users worldwide (as of July 2019). It comprises an online virtual market, the Xbox Games Store, which allows the purchase and download of games and various forms of multimedia. Online gaming on the Xbox first started on November 15, 2002, worldwide. The service is still active and continues to be played by gamers.

=== Microsoft Store ===
Microsoft Store is an online marketplace made for Microsoft's Xbox One and Xbox Series X|S consoles. The Xbox 360 console uses the previous Xbox Games Store client.

=== Xbox App ===
The Xbox app is a companion application available for Windows 8, Windows 10, Windows 11, iOS, Android (version 4.0 and above), and Windows Server 2012. It was announced by Microsoft during E3 2012 and released on October 26, 2012, coinciding with the release of Windows 8. It can connect with the console and allows more interactive entertainment, allowing mobile devices to potentially serve as second screens and remote controller.

=== Xbox Game Pass Cloud Gaming ===
Xbox Game Pass Cloud Gaming (codenamed xCloud during development) is the Microsoft's Xbox cloud gaming streaming service.

=== Content filter ===
In 2019, Microsoft released a content filtering to stop toxicity in online gaming. The service enables players to report messages, Gamertags, photos, and any other toxic content on its platform.

=== Xbox Game Pass ===
Xbox Game Pass is a subscription service from Microsoft for use with the Xbox One, Xbox Series X/S, Windows 10 and Windows 11. The Xbox Game Pass grants users access to a catalog of games from a range of publishers for a single monthly subscription price. The service was launched on June 1, 2017.

=== Xbox Wire ===
Xbox Wire is Xbox's news blog, launched by Microsoft in May 2013 in preparation for the announcement of the Xbox One. It was Microsoft's first Xbox-focused blog since it shut down Gamerscore in early 2009. In March 2022, a Japanese-language version of the site was published as part of Microsoft's focus on the Japanese gaming market.

== Software ==
The main interface for all four generations of Xbox has been the Xbox Dashboard, which allows users to manage games stored on the console, play media, and access system settings. Since 2002, the Dashboard has been integrated with the Xbox network which provides online functionality and storefront options. The operating systems for all Xbox platforms are heavily modified versions of the Windows NT operating system; the original Xbox and the Xbox 360 system software are based on Windows 2000, and the latest system software for Xbox One and Xbox Series X/S is based on Windows 11, with support for Universal Windows Platform (UWP) applications.

=== Xbox Family Settings App ===
In May 2020, Xbox presented a preview version of an app that allows parents and guardians to set daily limits for their children's playing time, provides weekly activity reports, filters out age-restricted games, and places limits on online communication. This is the attempt of Microsoft to promote a message of responsible gaming.

== Controllers ==
=== Xbox controller ===
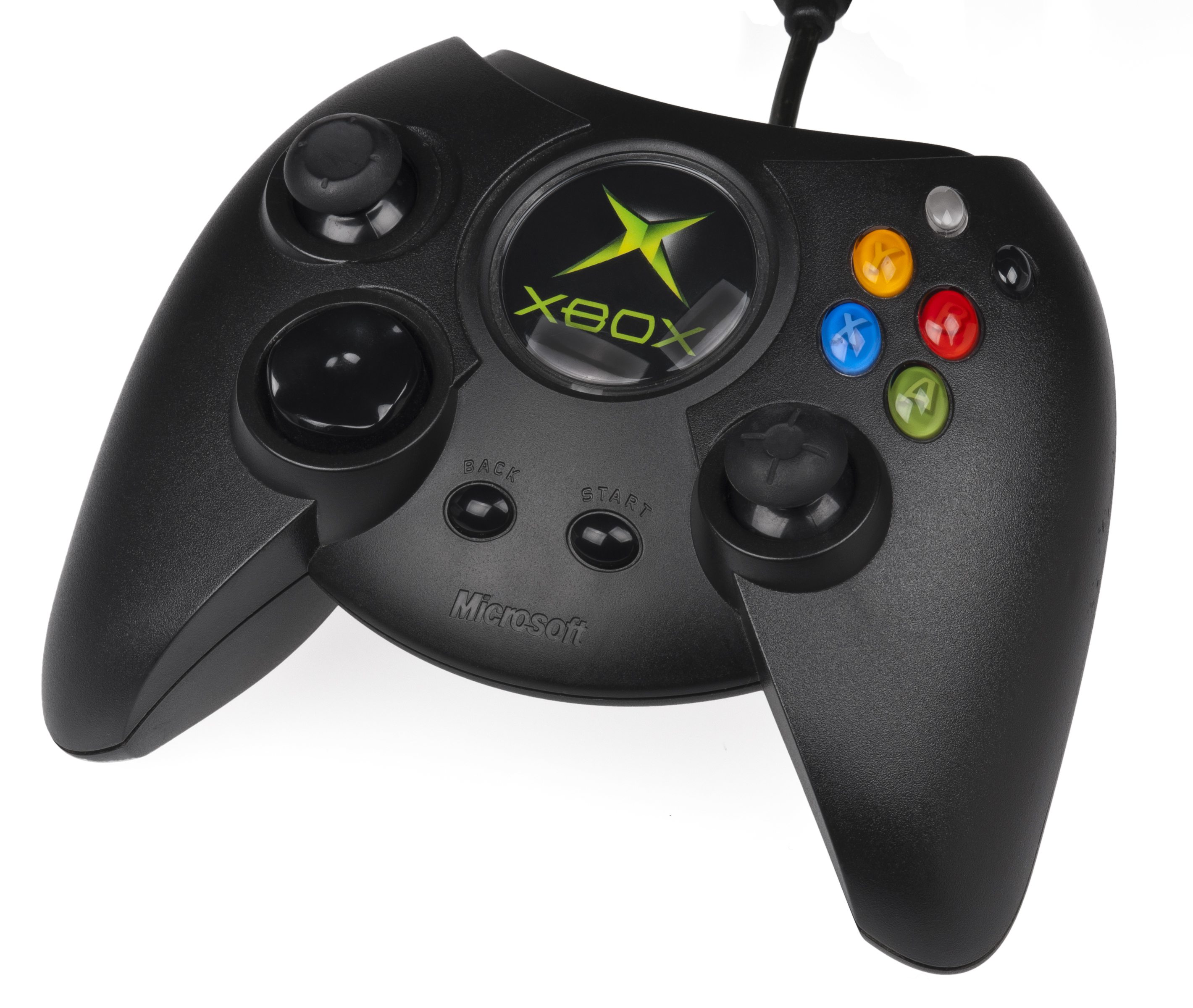
Original Xbox "Duke" controller, first showcased in 2000

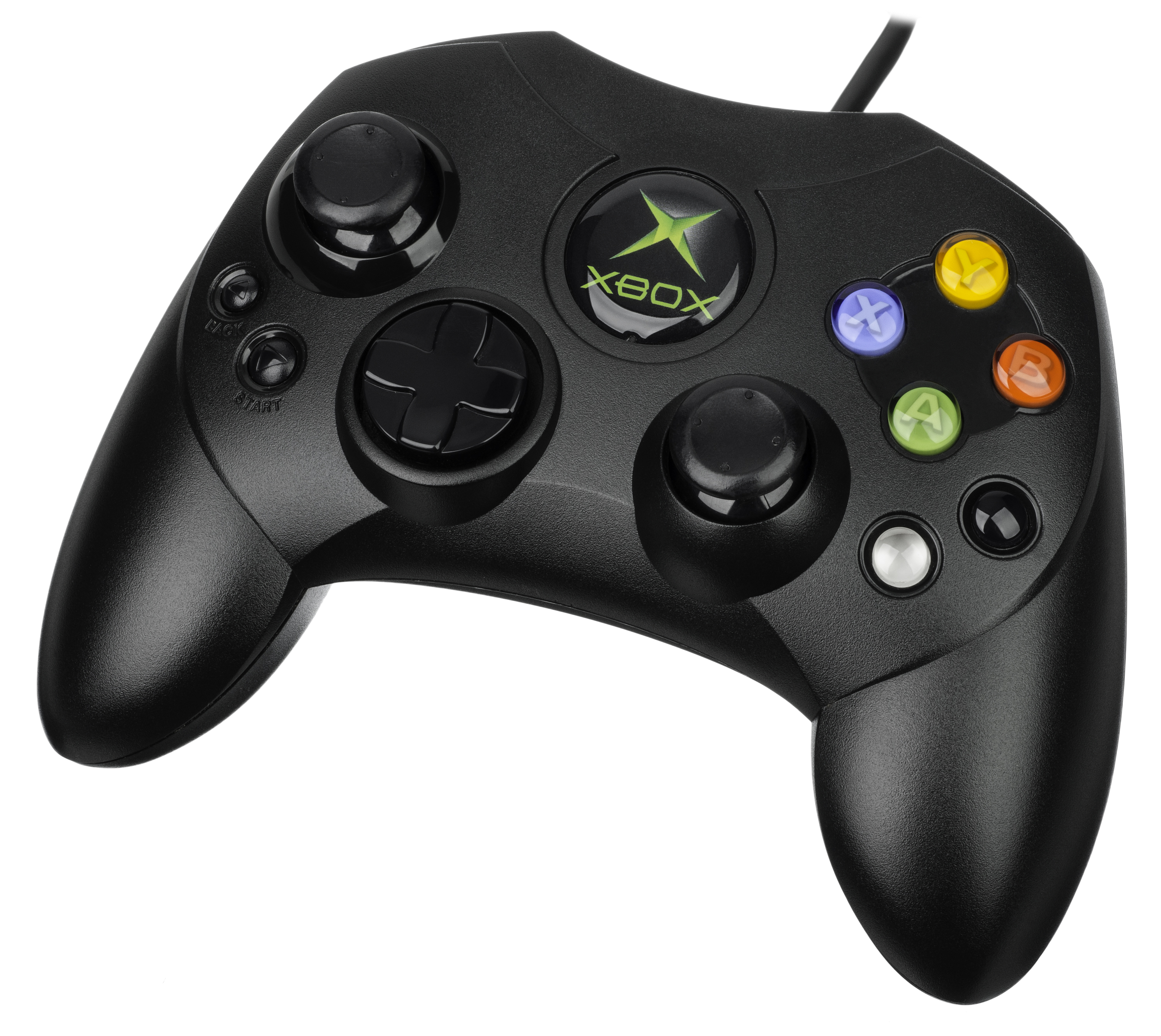
Xbox Controller S, which first shipped in 2002

Released in 2001, the Xbox control pad was the first controller made for the original Xbox. The Xbox controller features two analog sticks, a pressure-sensitive D-pad, two analog triggers, a Back button, a Start button, two accessory slots and six 8-bit analog action buttons (A/Green, B/Red, X/Blue, Y/Yellow, and Black and White buttons). The original Xbox controller (nicknamed the "Fatty" and later the "Duke") was the controller initially bundled with Xbox systems for all territories except Japan, which received a more compact controller called the Controller S. The Controller S was later made the standard included controller in all territories.

=== Xbox 360 controller ===
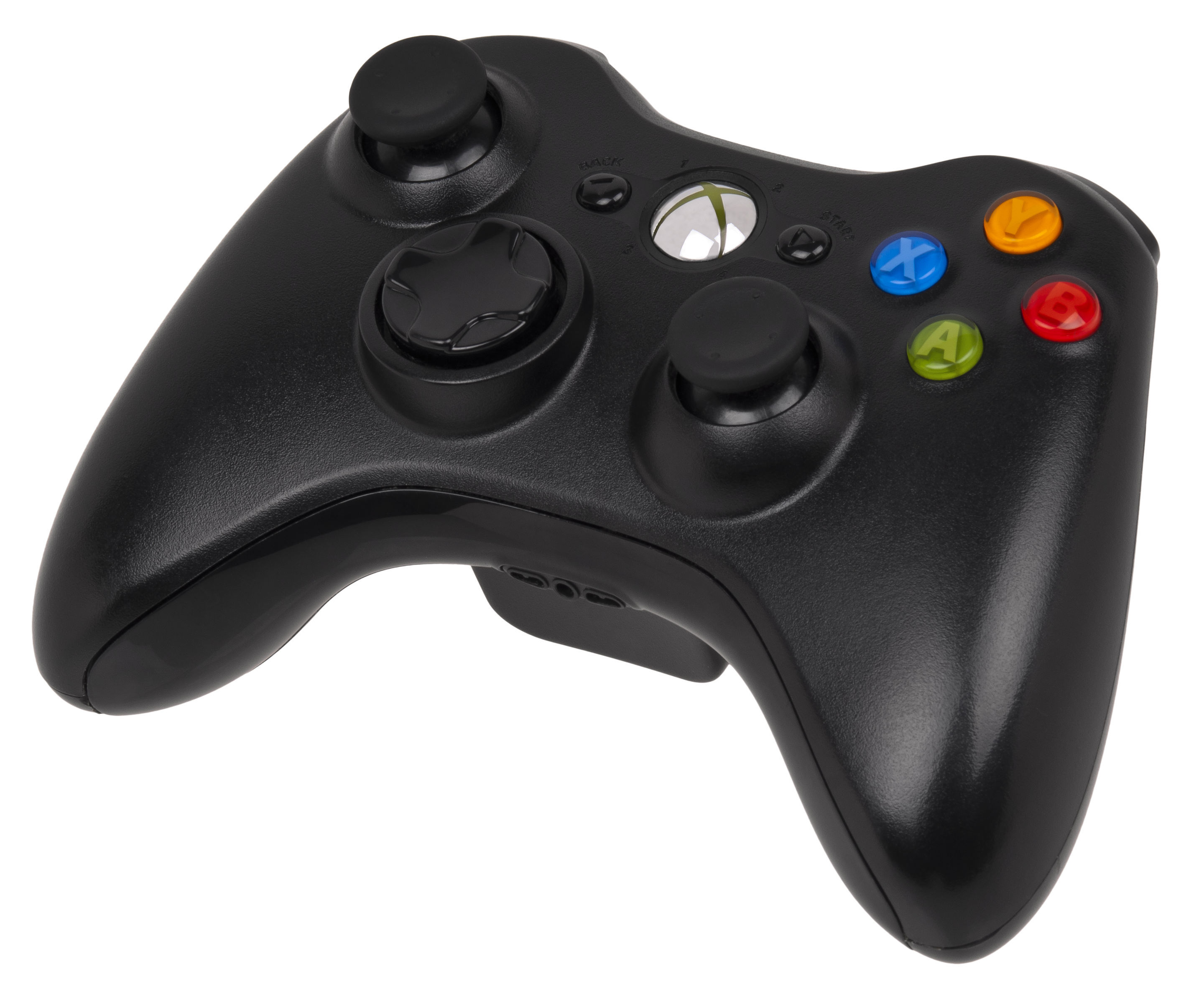
Xbox 360 S Controller

Released in 2005, the Xbox 360 controller for the Xbox 360 succeeded its predecessor. A standard Xbox 360 controller features eleven digital buttons, two analog triggers, two analog sticks and a digital D-pad. The right face of the controller features four digital action buttons; (A/Green, B/Red, X/Blue, and Y/Yellow). The lower right houses the right analog stick, in the lower left is a digital D-pad and on the left face is the left analog stick. Both analog sticks can also be "clicked in" to activate a digital button beneath. In the center of the controller face are digital "Start", "Back" and "Guide" buttons. The "Guide" button is labelled with the Xbox logo, and is used to turn on the console/controller and to access the guide menu. It is also surrounded by the "ring of light", which indicates the controller number, as well as flashing when connecting and to provide notifications. The left and right "shoulders" each feature a digital shoulder button, or "bumper", and an analog trigger.

=== Xbox Wireless Controller (2013–present) ===
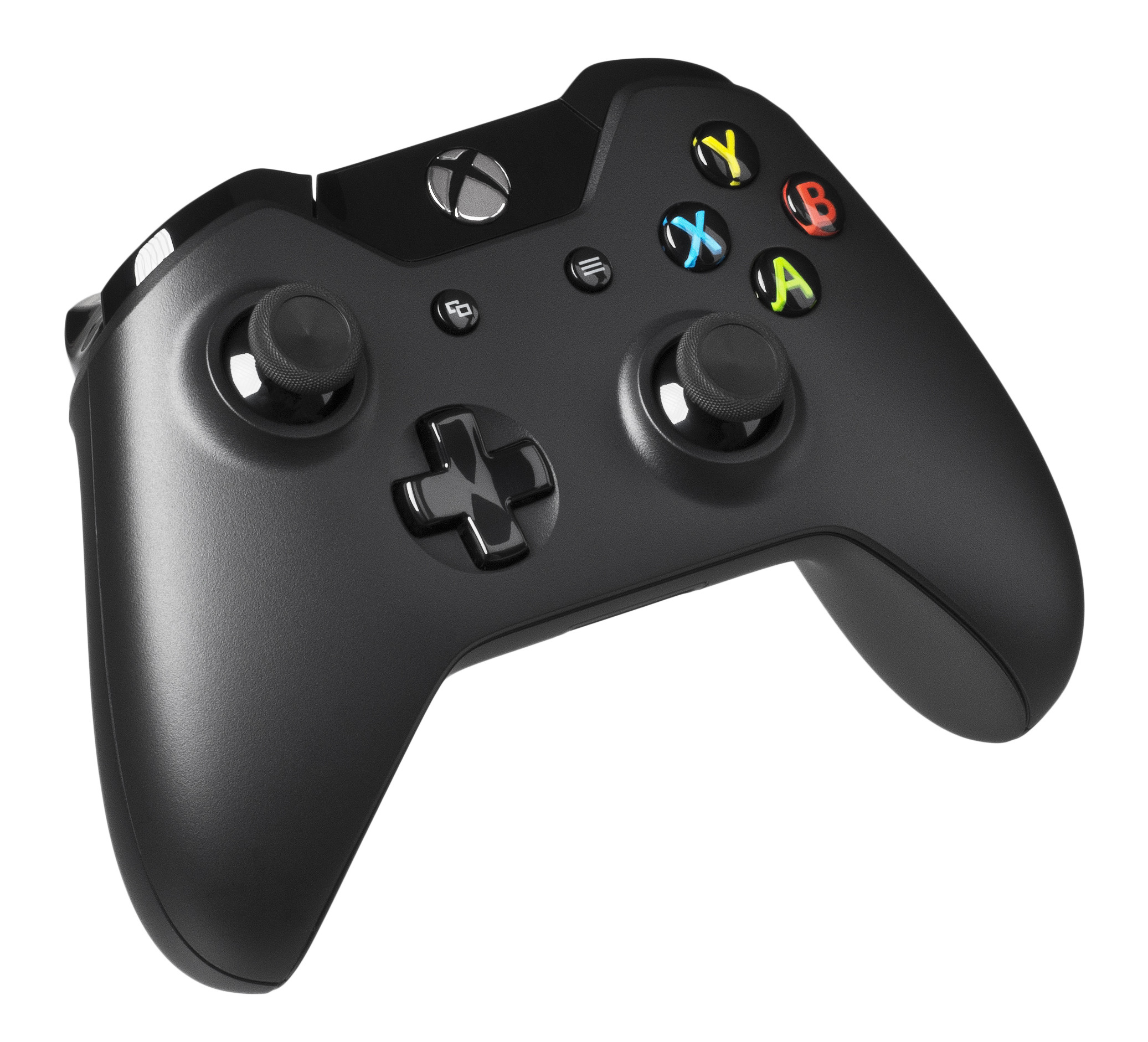
Xbox One Controller

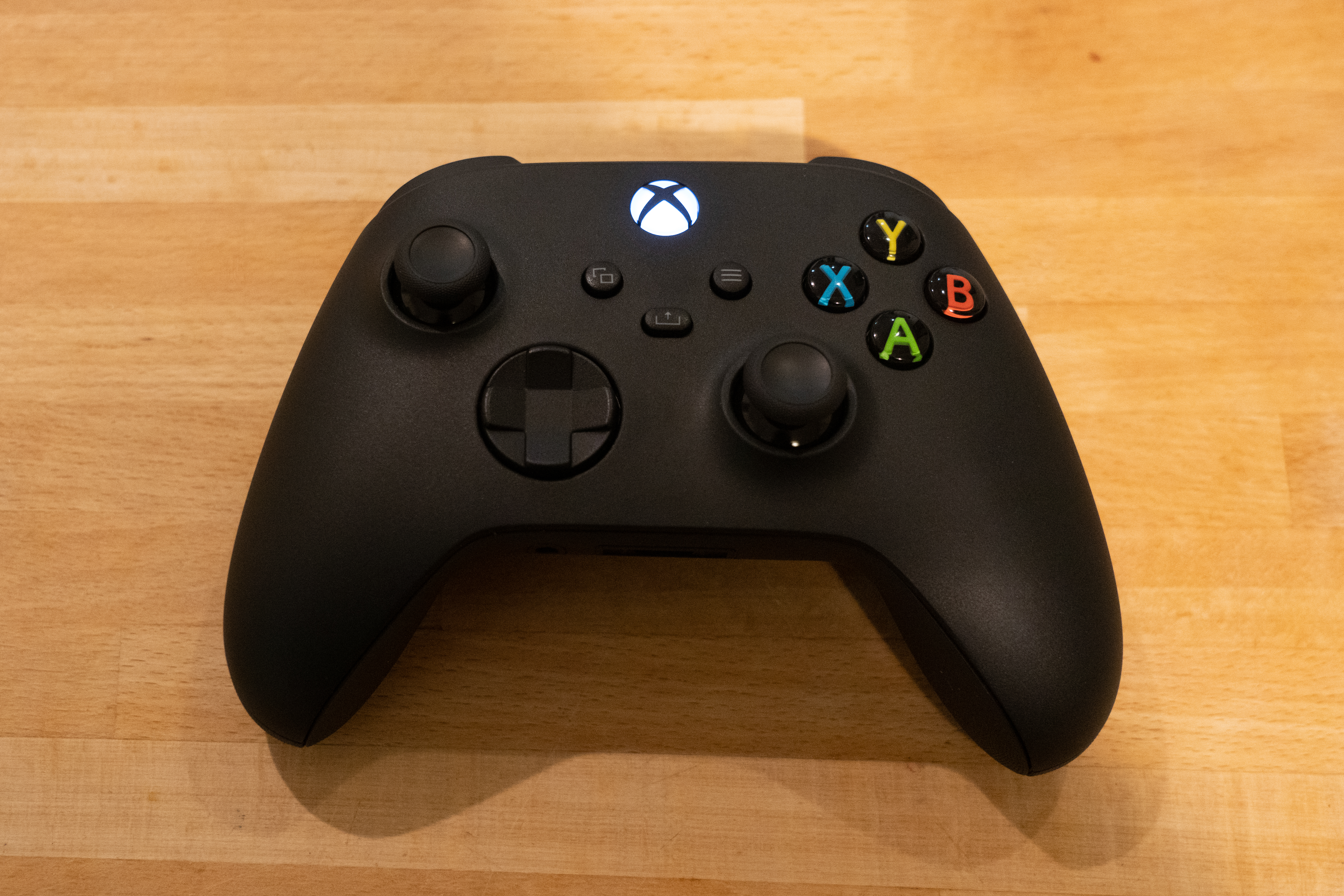
Xbox Series X/S Controller

==== Xbox One controller ====
The Xbox One console has a revised controller with forty improvements over the 360's controller. This new controller is built to work with Kinect. The Start and Back buttons are replaced with Menu and View buttons. It has impulse triggers that replace the regular triggers. The Xbox button still brings up the mini-guide as of recent dashboard versions, though in earlier iterations it brought up the main dashboard menu while leaving the game uninterrupted. Newer revisions of the controller see the glossy backplate where the Xbox logo lies become matte and unified with the main faceplate, as well as textured grips on the back of the handles, a headphone jack, and bluetooth support.

==== Xbox Series X/S Controller ====
The Series X/S controller doesn't change much from the Xbox One controller, adding a capture and share button, a hybrid d-pad, improved ergonomics, and better gripping on the bumpers and triggers. The controller is also promised to be cross compatible with certain PCs and mobile devices, as well as the Xbox One.

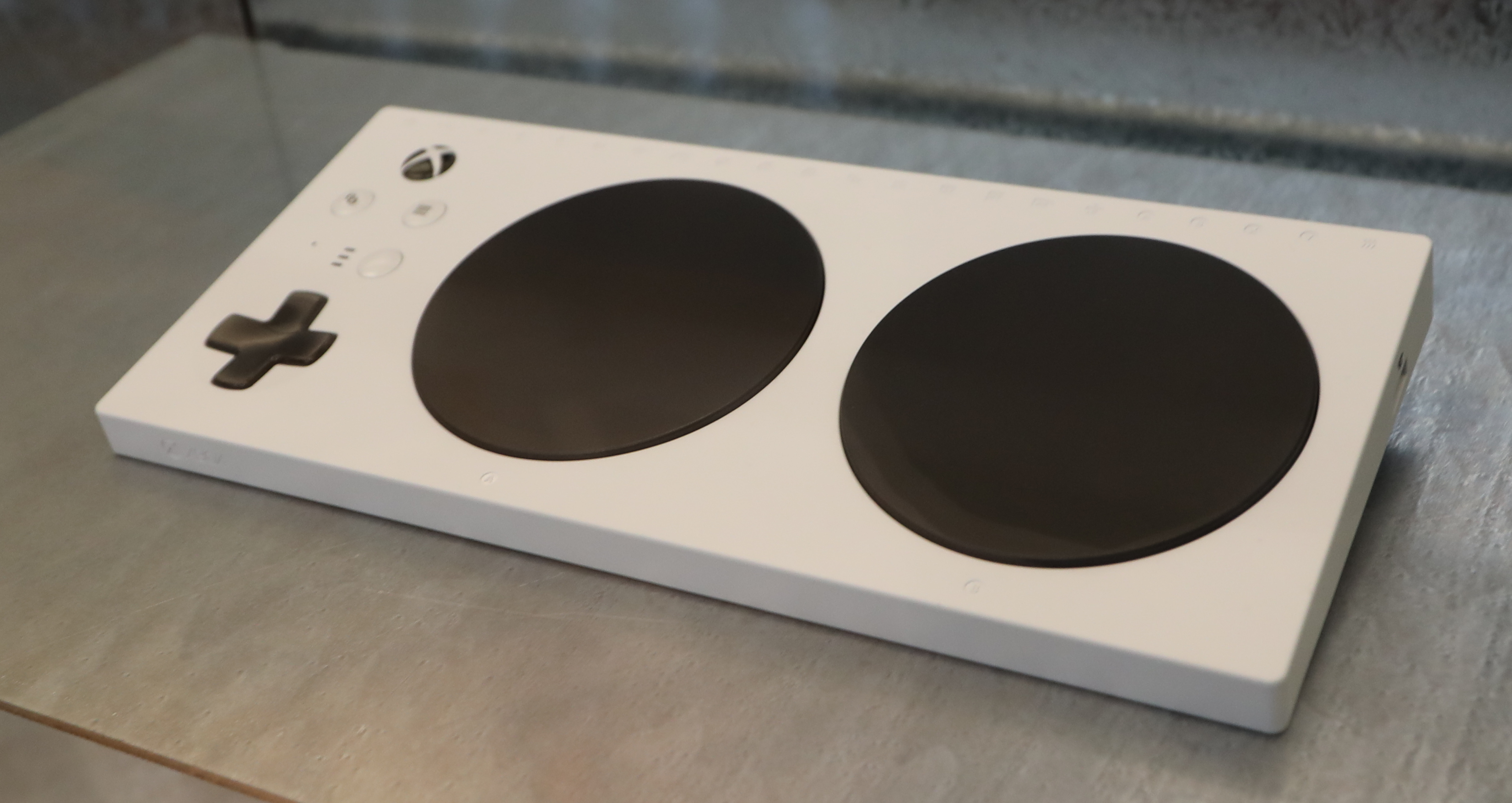
Xbox Adaptive Controller

=== Xbox Adaptive Controller ===
The Xbox Adaptive Controller is a special controller designed for accessibility features for players. Besides being physically larger than typical controllers, it includes additional ports to allow other devices to be connected and mapped to other controller functions. The controller is not limited to just Xbox and Windows platforms but also is compatible with the PlayStation and Nintendo Switch.

=== Xbox Nano Wireless Controller ===
Xbox Nano Wireless Controller

The Xbox Nano Wireless Controller is a smaller, compact version of the standard wireless controller designed for portability. It was released on November 4, 2026.

== Other accessories ==
=== Kinect ===
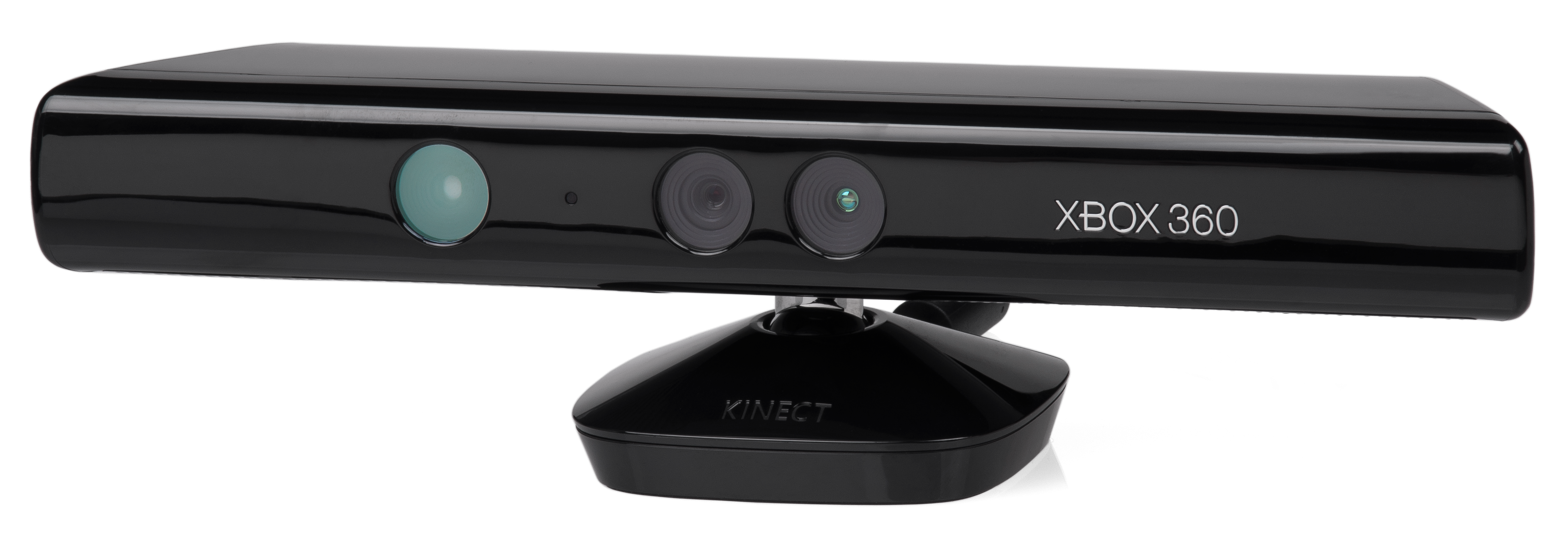
The Xbox 360 Kinect sensor

Kinect (stylized as KINECT) is a motion sensing input device by Microsoft for the Xbox 360 video game console and Windows PCs. Based around a webcam-style add-on peripheral for the Xbox 360 console, it enables users to control and interact with the Xbox 360 without the need to touch a game controller, through a natural user interface using gestures and spoken commands. The project is aimed at broadening the Xbox 360's audience beyond its typical gamer base. Kinect competes with the Wii Remote Plus and PlayStation Move with PlayStation Eye motion controllers for the Wii and PlayStation 3 home consoles, respectively. A version for Windows was released on February 1, 2012.

Kinect was launched in North America on November 4, 2010, in Europe on November 10, 2010, in Australia, New Zealand and Singapore on November 18, 2010, and in Japan on November 20, 2010. Purchase options for the sensor peripheral include a bundle with the game Kinect Adventures and console bundles with either a 4 GB or 250 GB Xbox 360 console and Kinect Adventures.

The Kinect claimed the Guinness World Record of being the "fastest selling consumer electronics device" after selling a total of 8 million units in its first 60 days. 24 million units of the Kinect sensor had been shipped as of January 2012.

Microsoft released Kinect software development kit for Windows 7 on June 16, 2011. This SDK was meant to allow developers to write Kinecting apps in C++/CLI, C#, or Visual Basic .NET.

Additional information on the Xbox One Kinect was released on June 6, 2013, including information on how to turn off the "always on" feature.

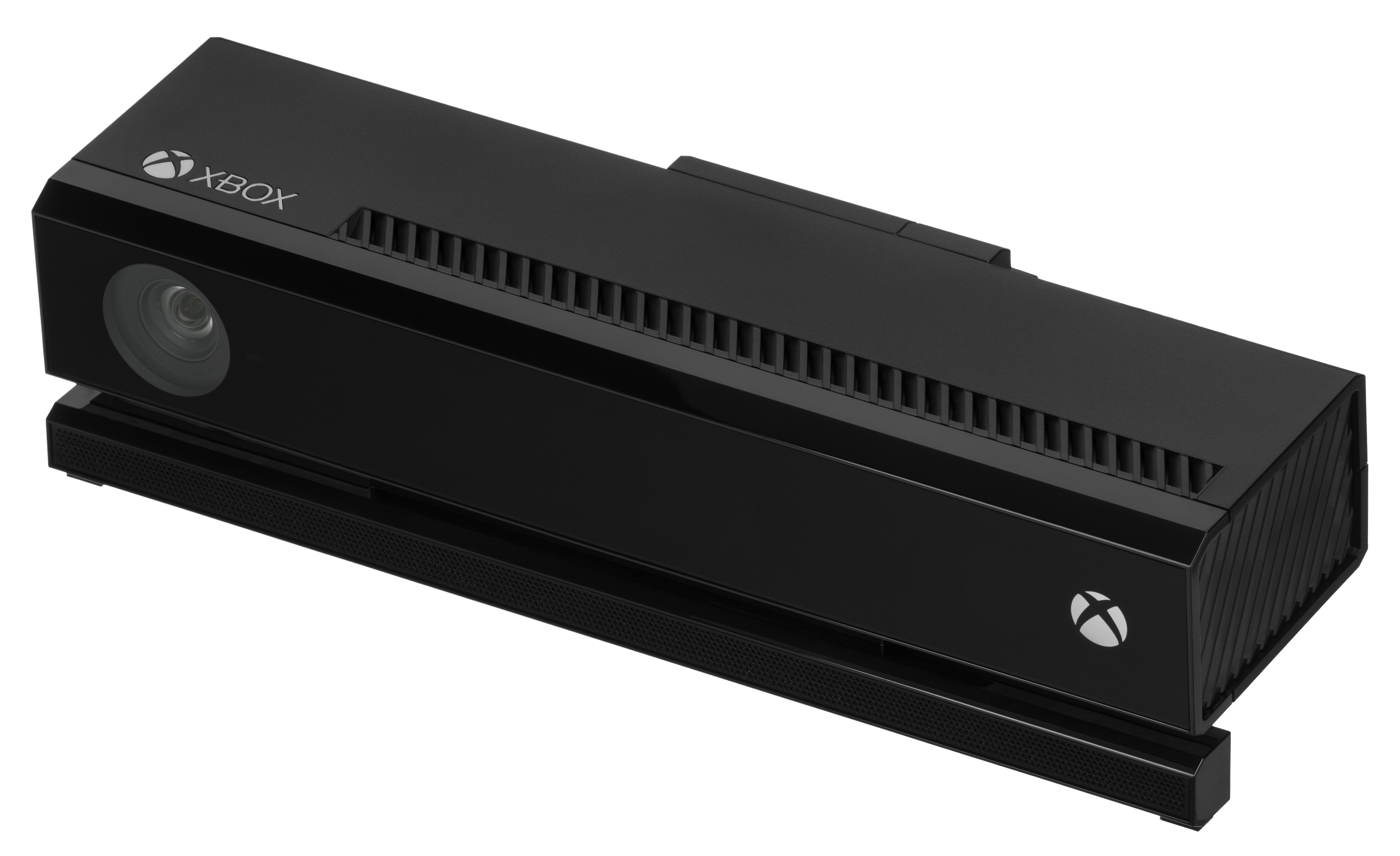
The Xbox One Kinect sensor

Although featuring improved performance over the original Xbox 360 Kinect, its successor the Xbox One Kinect was subject to mixed responses. It was praised for its wide-angle, its fast response time and high-quality camera. However, the Kinect's inability to understand some accents in English was criticized. Furthermore, controversies surround Microsoft's intentional tying of the sensor with the Xbox One console despite the initial requirements for the sensor being plugged in at all times having been revised since its initial announcement. There have also been a number of concerns regarding privacy.

=== Headsets ===
When the Xbox Live online service was launched in 2002, the Xbox Communicator headset was included with the Live Starter Kit. The Communicator, which enabled in-game voice chat, consisted of a wired headset and an interface module. The module plugged into the controller's top expansion slot, and the headset plugged into the module; the interface module was equipped with a dial to control volume and a button to mute the microphone. The headset socket on the module was a standard 2.5mm TRS audio jack with monaural input and output, compatible with cellular phone headsets.

Xbox 360 controllers featured a built-in monaural 2.5mm TRS jack also compatible with standard cellular phone headsets, allowing players to reuse the Xbox Communicator headset and chat on Xbox Live without a separate interface module. The premium console bundle included a wired Xbox 360 Live Communicator headset with grey and white cosmetics matching the console, which also was available separately; the wired headset connected to the audio jack on the bottom of the controller through a wide plug that included mute and volume controls. An updated Xbox 360 Headset was released in 2010 with black cosmetics, bundled with the Xbox 360 S; for the revised wired headset, the mute/volume controls were moved to a position inline along the cable.

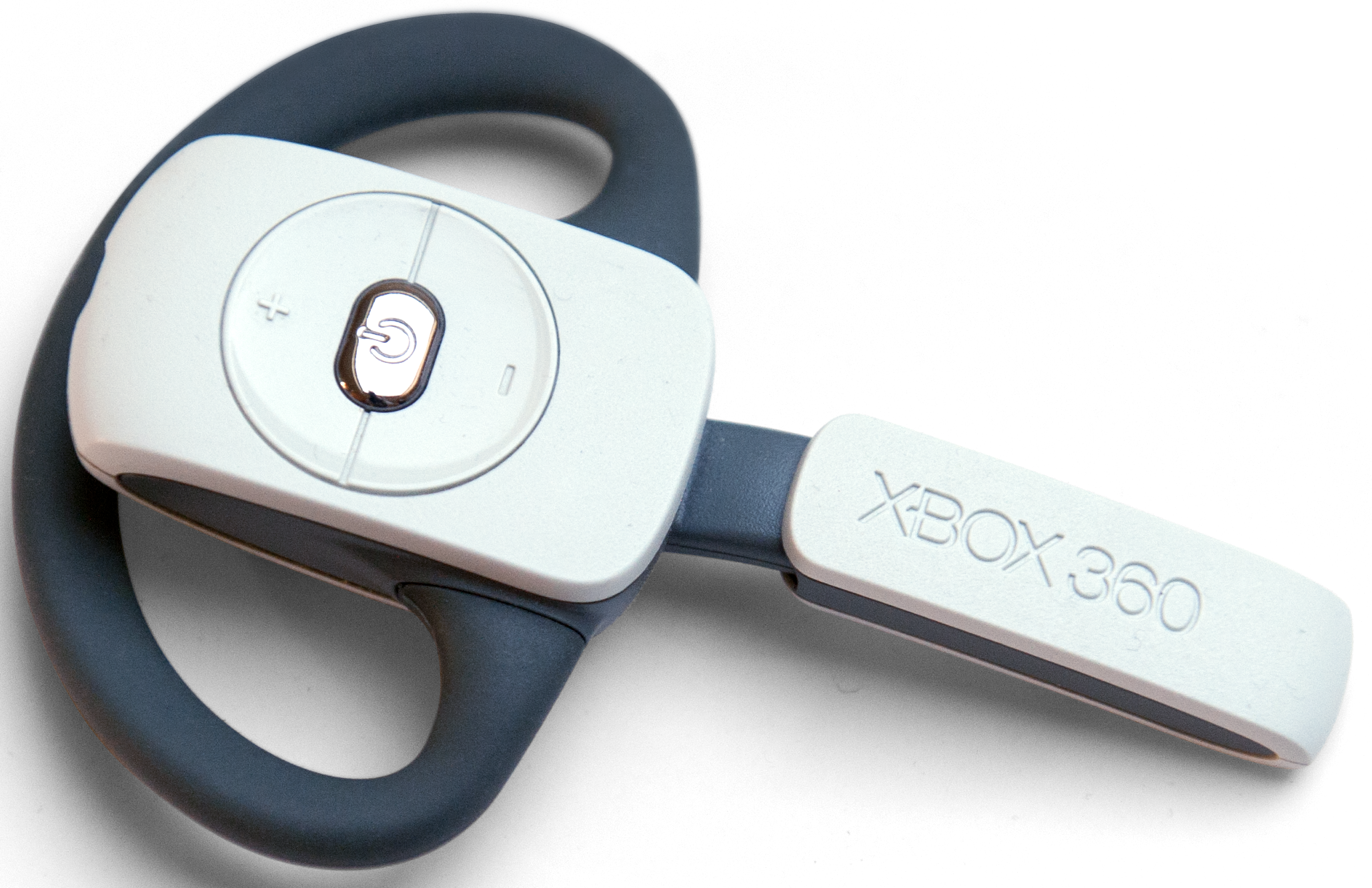
Xbox 360 Wireless Headset

Microsoft also announced the Xbox 360 Wireless Headset, a first-party single-ear headset accessory designed for and released with the Xbox 360 console in November 2005. Special editions of the wireless headset were released with colors themed for Halo 3 (green/orange, September 2007), the Xbox 360 S (black, 2010), and Halo: Reach (silver, September 2010). It was replaced by the Xbox 360 Wireless Headset with Bluetooth in 2011, which could be used with the console (using the Xbox wireless protocol) or a phone (using Bluetooth).

The initial revision of the Xbox One Wireless Controller (Model 1537) also included a 2.5mm monaural jack compatible with standard cellular phone headsets. Microsoft bundled the Xbox One Chat Headset with each console starting from launch in 2013; the headset was permanently wired to an interface module that plugged into the controller's expansion port and provided microphone mute and volume controls. In addition, Microsoft released the Xbox One Stereo Headset in early March 2014, bundled with a Stereo Headset Adapter, which allowed players to listen to in-game audio blended with chat simultaneously. The Adapter connected to the controller's expansion port and headset jack, and the Headset connected to the Adapter through a 3.5mm plug. Prior headsets released with the Xbox and Xbox 360 were limited to voice chat only. A white-colored special edition was released in fall 2016. The next revision of the controller (Model 1697) replaced with 2.5mm jack with a 3.5mm jack.

A new Xbox Wireless Headset was introduced in February 2021, targeted for use on the Xbox One, Xbox Series X/S, and Windows computers. The outer surface of each earcup is a rotary control; the right earcup controls overall volume, and the left earcup controls game/chat mix level. It is equipped with both proprietary Xbox Wireless and Bluetooth radios, and could be connected to both simultaneously. A corresponding Xbox Stereo Headset, which omits the wireless connections in favor of a standard 3.5mm plug and also omits the game/chat mix control dial, was introduced in August 2021 with a reduced price.

== Marketing ==
The YXSTABY gaming collection (2026), designed in collaboration with Xbox and IKEA

In 2016, Microsoft announced that it would hold its own Xbox FanFest instead of a press conference at the Gamescom annual European video game convention. Microsoft held an Xbox FanFest in Sydney in September 2016.

Microsoft held a 20th anniversary celebration stream for the Xbox on November 15, 2021. During it, they announced that a documentary behind the history of the Xbox, titled Power On: The Story of Xbox. The documentary was released in six parts starting on December 13, 2021. The documentary won the Daytime Emmy Award for Outstanding Single Camera Editing.

=== Collaboration with IKEA ===
In August 2026, Swedish home furnishings retailer IKEA and Xbox, announced YXSTABY, a collaborative line of home furniture and accessories designed specifically for video game players.

The collection was launched globally on October 1, 2026. YXSTABY combines minimalist Scandinavian interior design with gaming hardware ergonomics. The nine-piece collection features furniture and accessories tailored for gamers, including a motion stool based on an Xbox controller's thumbstick, a D-pad-shaped cushion, lounge chair, rolling tables and mirrored display cases for controllers.

== See also ==
- SNK
