= List of Xbox One and Series X/S accessories =

Overview of the accessories made for the Xbox One, Series X, and Series S

The Xbox One and Xbox Series X/S game consoles, developed by Microsoft, feature a number of first-party and third-party accessories.

== Game controllers/Gamepads ==
=== Xbox Wireless Controller ===
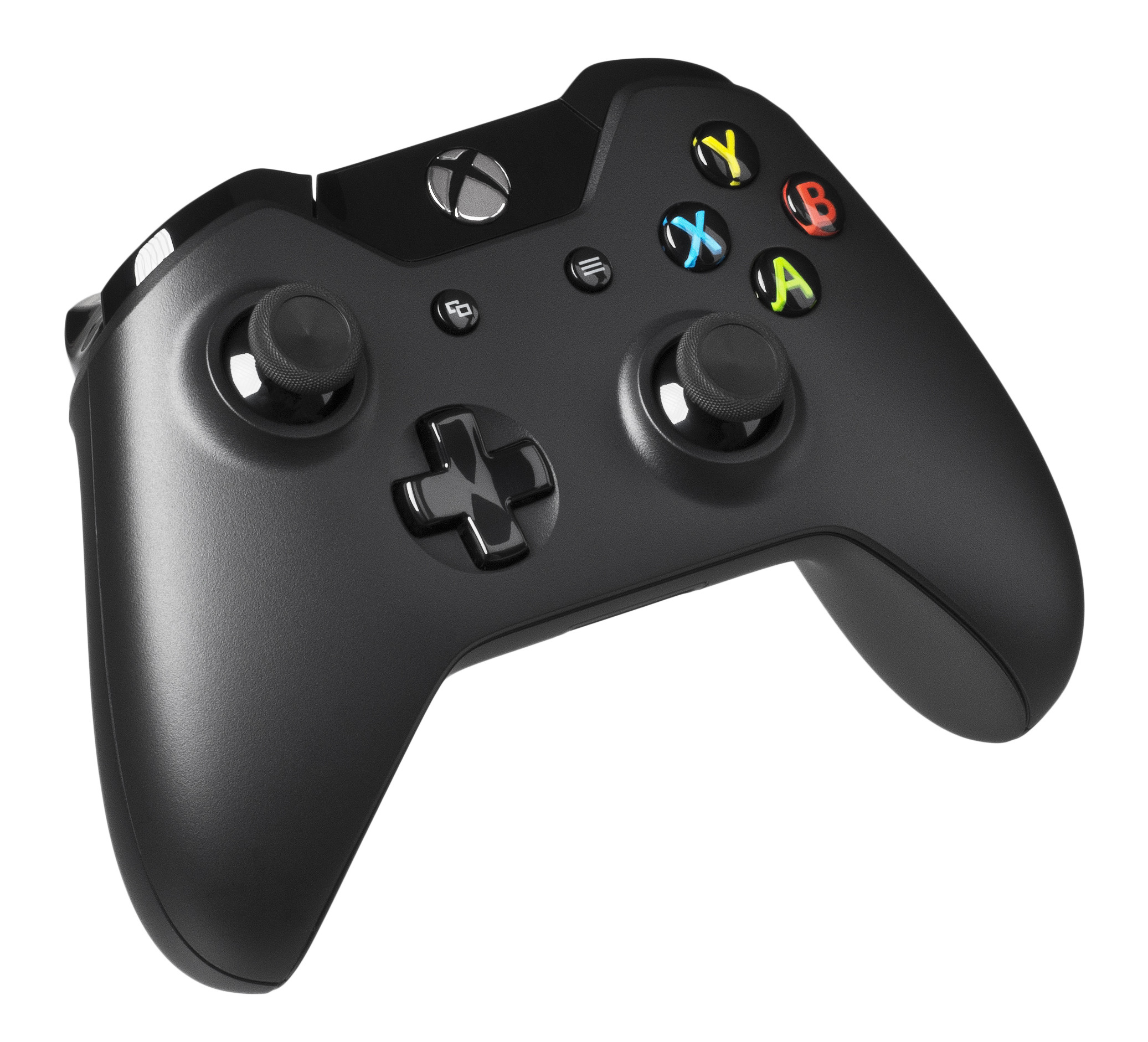
Xbox Wireless Controller (Model 1537)

Up to four controllers are able to connect to Xbox One, Series X, or Series S including wired and wireless gamepads. The wireless controllers run on either AA batteries (Alkaline or rechargeable) or on a rechargeable battery pack. Xbox 360 controllers are not compatible with the Xbox One or Series X/S. The controller is also compatible with PCs. The Xbox Wireless Controller has vibration feedback (Rumble Packs).

Several accessories plug into the ports on the standard Xbox Wireless Controller; these ports include one micro-USB/USB-C port on the top edge of the controller (between the triggers), one expansion port on the bottom edge of the controller, and an audio jack next to the expansion port. Accessories that use these ports include headsets, chatpads, and charging devices.

==== Stereo Headset Adapter ====
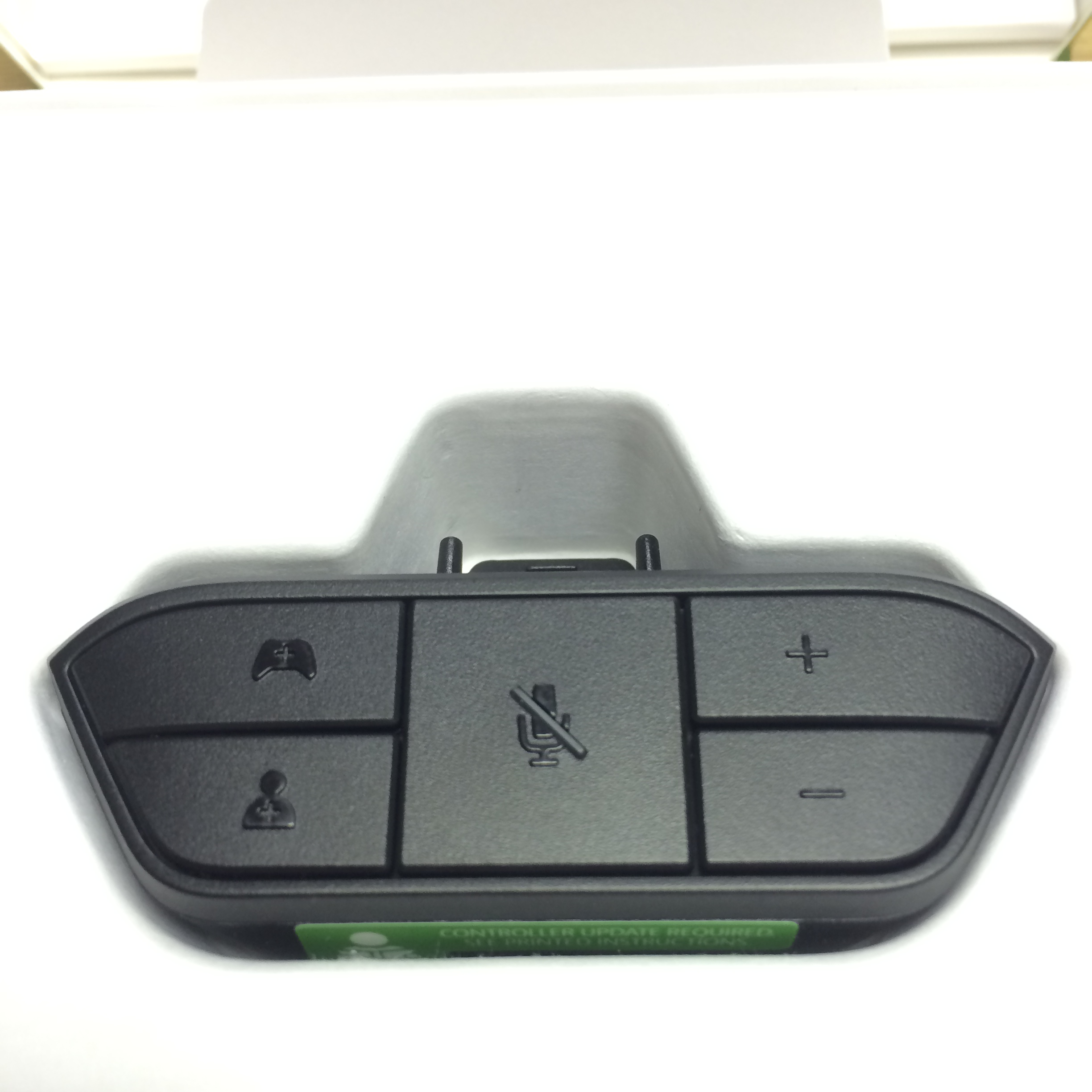
Stereo Headset Adapter (Model 1626)

Unlike later models, the original Xbox One Wireless Controller (Model 1537) lacks a 3.5 millimeter headset jack on the bottom edge of the controller. The Xbox One Stereo Headset Adapter (Model 1626) allows the use of stereo headsets with 3.5 millimeter headphone jacks using the rectangular expansion port on the bottom center of all Microsoft Xbox One controllers, including the original (Model 1537). The Stereo Headset Adapter includes five buttons which allow the player to balance chat and in-game audio output levels, adjust overall volume, and mute the chat microphone. It was available both separately and in a bundle with the Xbox One Stereo Headset (Model 1610).

==== Chatpad ====
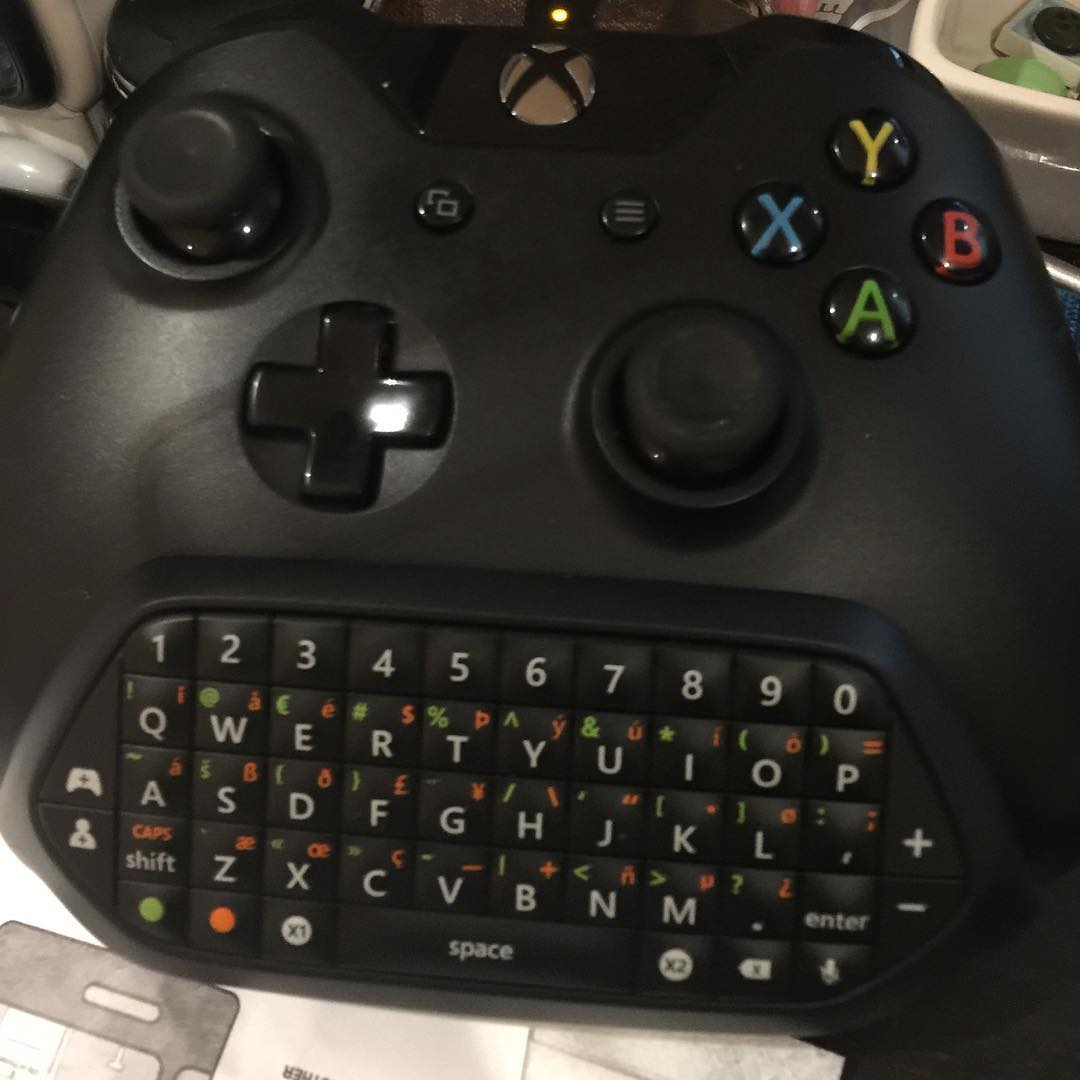
Chatpad (Model 1676) and controller

The Microsoft Chatpad keyboard attachment (Model 1676), similar to the Xbox 360 Messenger Kit, was unveiled at Gamescom on August 4, 2015. The Chatpad also includes the functions of the Stereo Headset Adapter and was bundled with the updated version of the Chat Headset terminating in a 3.5 mm headphone jack. In addition, the Chatpad features two dedicated programmable keys; the default behavior allowed the player to record screenshots (X1) and gameplay clips (X2) without using a software menu, if that functionality is enabled in the Xbox Dashboard settings.

==== Play and Charge Kit/Rechargeable Battery + USB-C Cable ====
Similar to the Xbox 360 version, the Play and Charge Kit (Model 1556/1727) is the official rechargeable battery pack for Xbox One controllers; it includes both the battery, which is installed in the existing battery compartment, and a charging cable, which allows players to charge the controller while playing a game. The cable is a standard USB-A to micro-USB cable 9 ft (2.7 m) long, equipped with an indicator light that provides state of charge information, glowing orange while charging and green or white when complete. The bundled Xbox One Li-Ion Rechargeable Battery has a 1400 mA-hr capacity at 3.0V.

The Play and Charge Kit was renamed to the Xbox Rechargeable Battery + USB-C Cable and released for the 2020 revision of the controller (Model 1914). The rechargeable battery pack is physically identical to the older version, and the update to the kit is limited to the bundled cable, which is now a 9 ft (2.7 m) USB-A to USB-C cable instead of micro USB. The updated cable has no indicator light.

=== Xbox Adaptive Controller ===
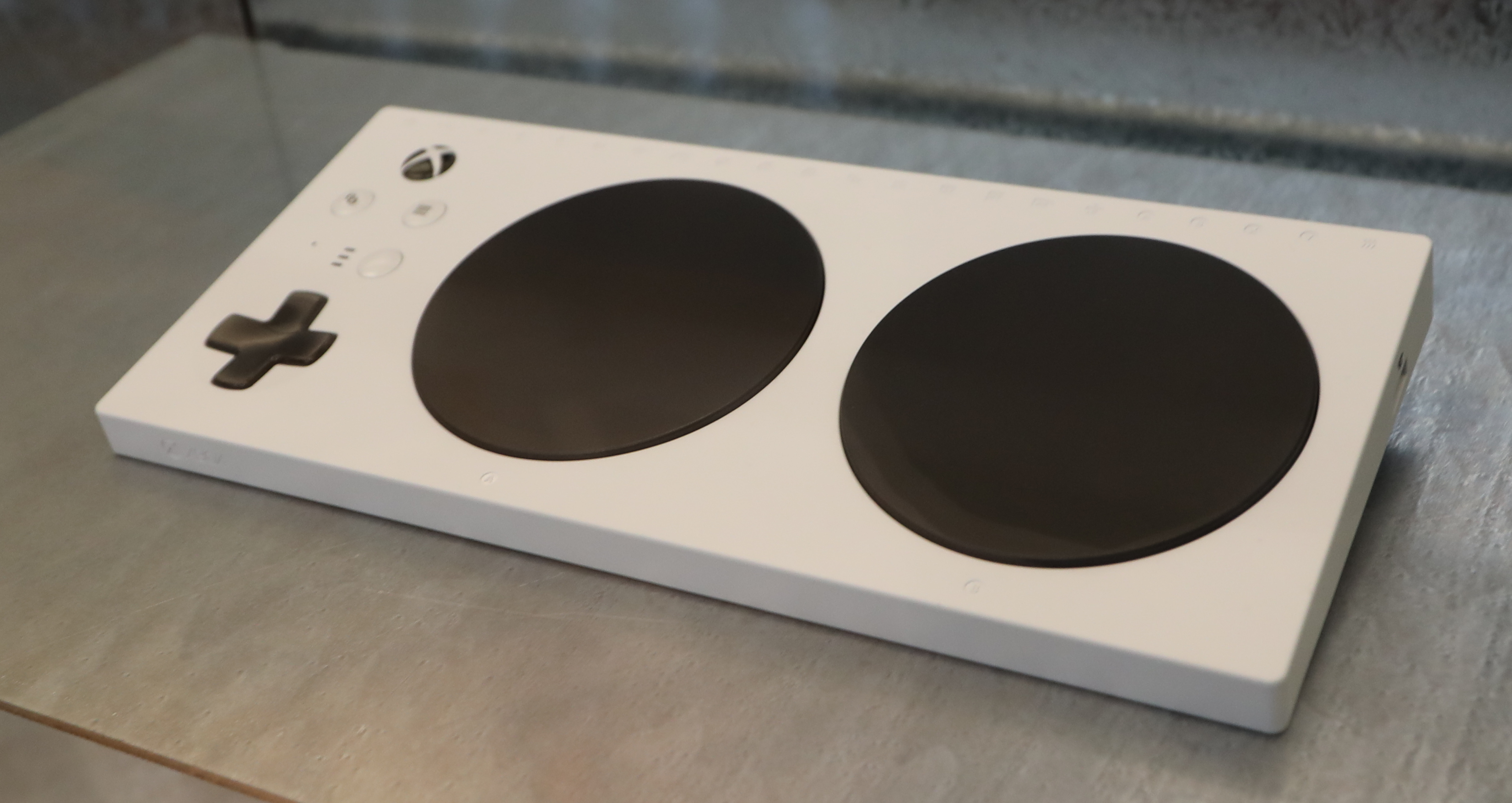
Xbox Adaptive Controller (Model 1826)

The Xbox Adaptive Controller (Model 1826) was released by Microsoft on September 4, 2018. It has a slim rectangular frame that is about a foot in length. The face of the controller has two large, domed buttons that can be mapped to any function using the Xbox Accessories app. The face also includes a large D-pad, menu button, view button, and the Xbox home button that are featured on a standard Xbox Wireless controller. The controller features USB ports on either side that are used to connect devices that map to analog stick functions. The back of the frame has nineteen 3.5 mm jacks that allow multiple assistive input devices to be connected; each jack corresponds to a different button, trigger, bumper or D-pad function on the standard Xbox Wireless controller. In addition, a button allows the player to select one of three saved profiles. The Xbox Adaptive Controller supports Windows 10 devices and Xbox One, Series X, and Series S consoles and is compatible with every game at a system level.

=== Kinect ===
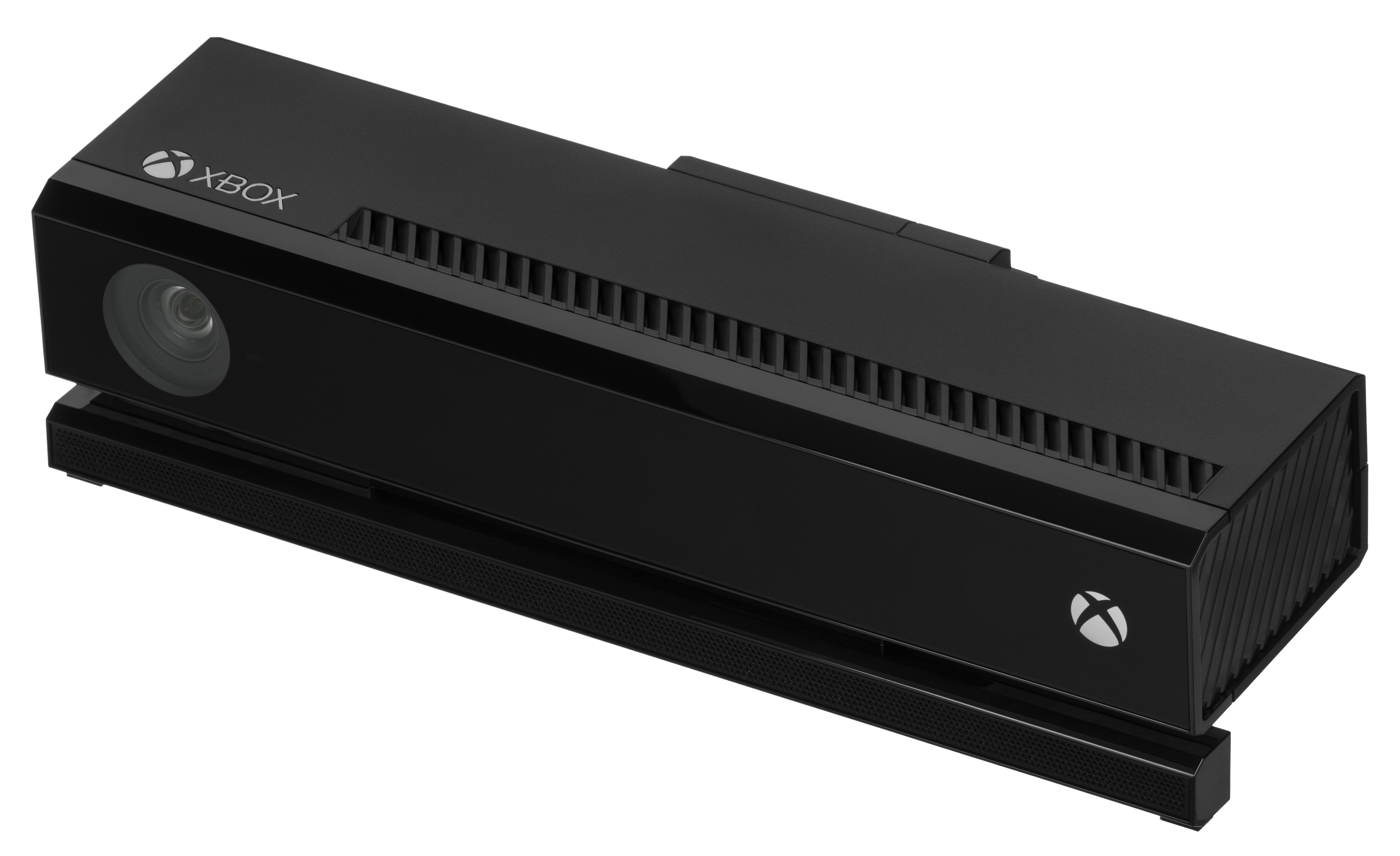
Xbox One Kinect (Model 1520)

Kinect (Codename "Project Natal", Model 1520) is a "controller-free gaming and entertainment experience" produced by Microsoft for the Xbox One. Based on an add-on peripheral for the console, it enables users to control and interact with the Xbox One with spoken commands, motions, gestures, or presented objects and images. Starting in 2016 with the launch of the Xbox One S and continuing with the Xbox One X, Microsoft removed the Kinect port from the console and made a Kinect port adapter available. At the end of October 2017, it was officially announced that production of the Kinect would cease.

The Xbox Series X and S are not compatible with the Kinect.

=== Xbox Wireless Adapter for Windows ===
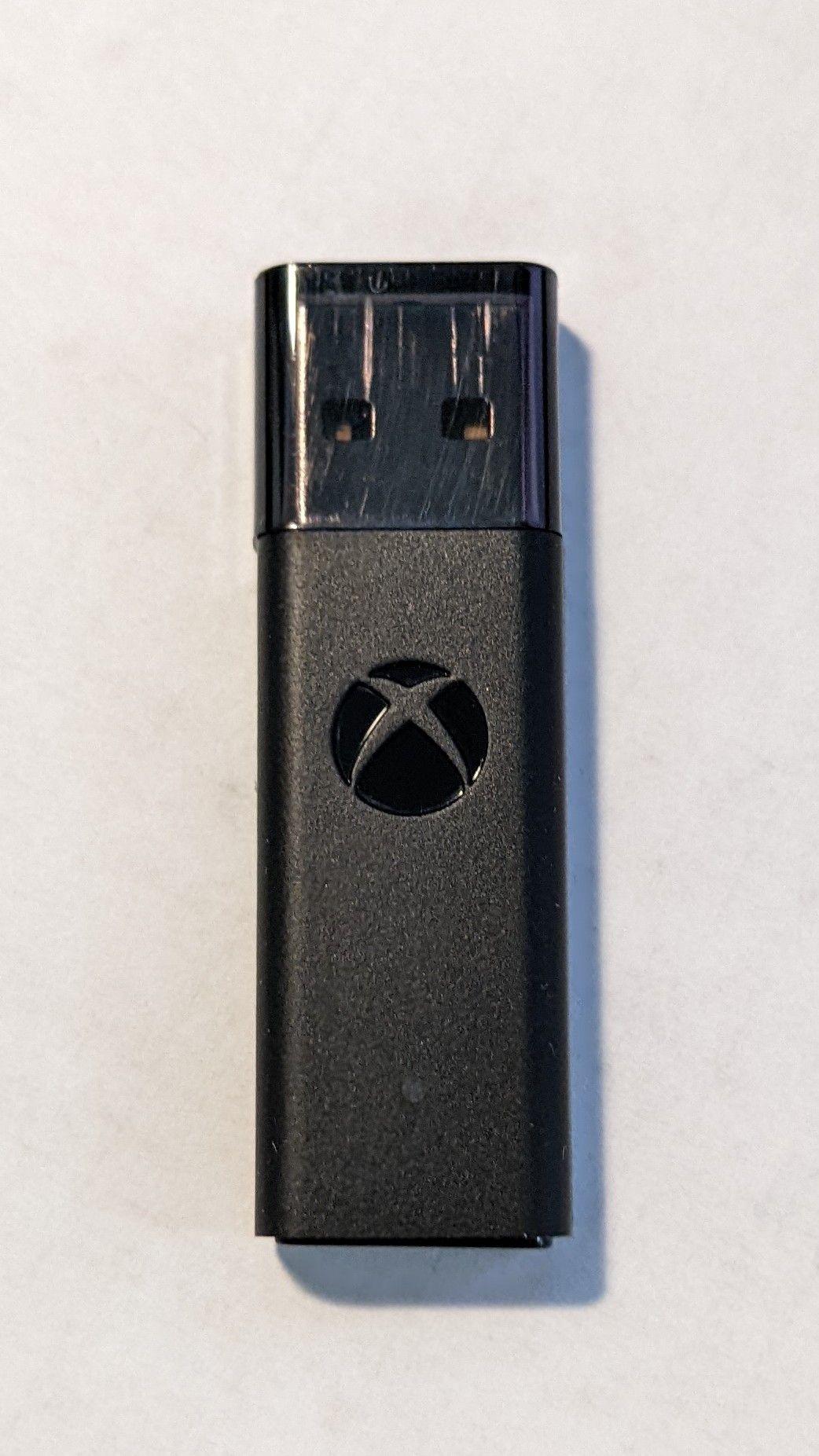
Xbox Wireless Adapter for Windows 10 (Model 1790)

The Xbox Wireless Adapter for Windows (Model 1713, uses Mediatek MT7600UAN chip) is a USB-A dongle with a single button that allows computers using the Windows 10 and Windows 11 operating systems to connect with Xbox wireless accessories (including controllers and headsets) via the Xbox Wireless protocol rather than Bluetooth. It was introduced in 2015. A revised version (Model 1790, uses Mediatek MT7612UN chip) was introduced in 2017 with a smaller size, reducing potential physical interference with adjacent USB ports.

=== Xbox Nano Controller ===
Xbox Nano Controller

The Xbox Nano Controller is a gamepad that is smaller than the Xbox Wireless Controller. It has all of the same buttons as the 2020 revision but has a built-in rechargeable battery. The controller is designed to fit inside a pocket. It was introduced in October 2026.

== Media devices ==
=== Media Remote ===
The Xbox One Media Remote (Model 1577) is an infrared remote control that runs on AAA batteries and does not require pairing. It can be used out of the box without any configuration and lights up automatically once touched. The infrared receiver is on the front of the console, not the Kinect sensor. For the Xbox One X and One S, the infrared receiver is on the front of the console behind an oval window next to the pairing button, which is used to pair controllers and other devices using the Xbox Wireless protocol. On the Xbox Series X and S, the infrared receiver is hidden inside the pairing button on the front of the console next to the USB-A port.

=== Digital TV Tuner ===
Released only in Europe, the Xbox One Digital TV Tuner (Model 1611) allows users to watch live, over-the-air digital TV channels on the Xbox One. The signal from the antenna is connected to the Digital TV Tuner via a coaxial cable RG6 socket, which then converts and transmits the data to the console via a USB-A output plug. It supports DVB-T2, DVB-T, and DVB-C broadcasts. It is not compatible with the Xbox Series X and S.

A third-party Digital TV Tuner was available for the Xbox One in the United States and Canada through the Microsoft Store starting in 2015. It was made by Hauppauge Computer Works.

== Headsets ==
=== Chat Headset ===
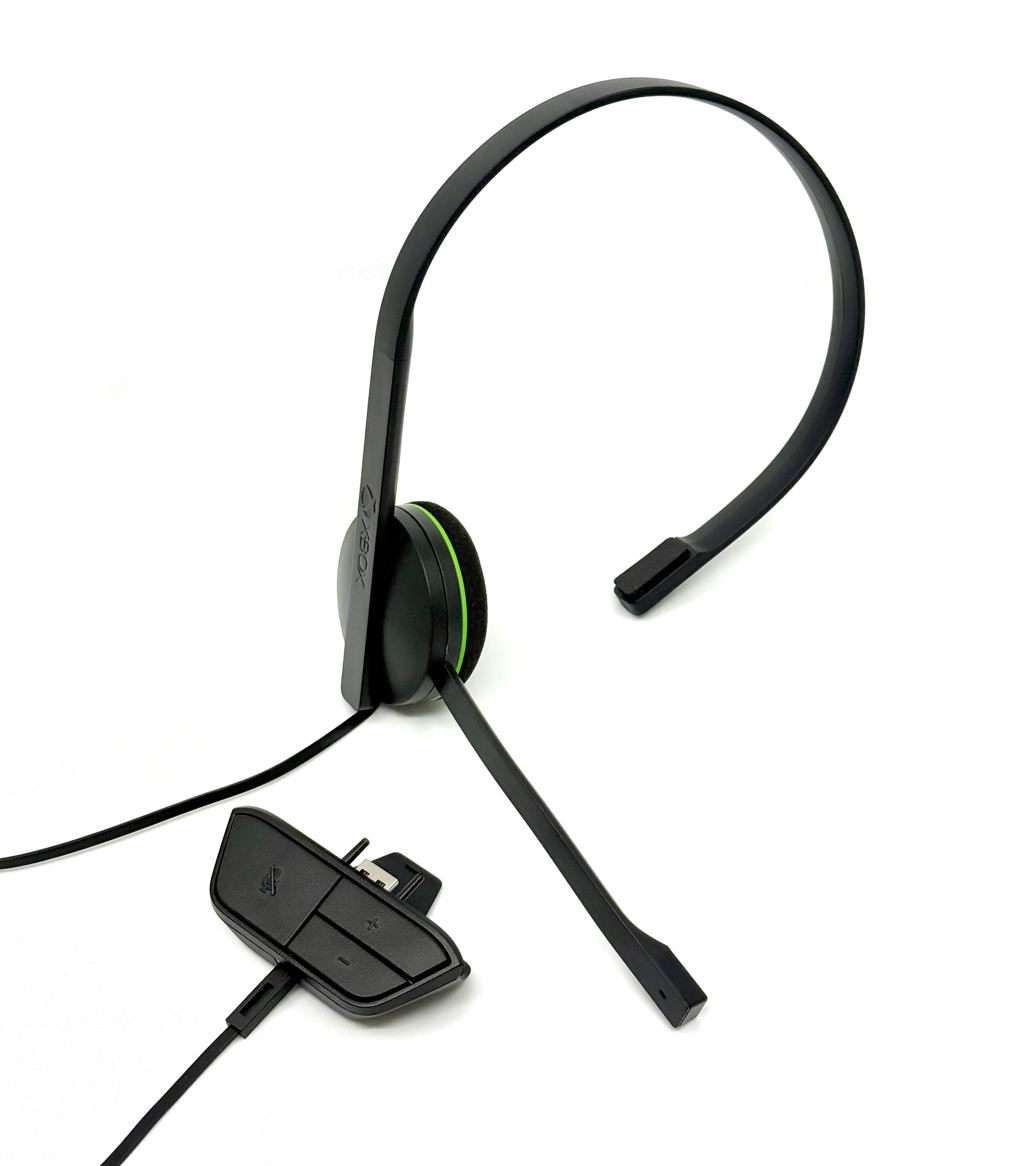
Xbox One Chat Headset (Model 1564)

The Xbox One Wired Chat Headset (Model 1564) is a single-ear headset with a boom microphone permanently wired to an adapter that plugs into the rectangular expansion port on the bottom edge of the Xbox One controller; it also engages the two round holes flanking the expansion port with plastic alignment prongs for stability. There are three buttons on the adapter, which allow the player to adjust chat volume and mute the microphone. A version of the Chat Headset was later available with a standard 3.5 mm headphone plug instead of the adapter; on the updated version, the controls were on a small plastic pod inline with the cable.

=== Stereo Headset ===
The Xbox One Stereo Headset (Model 1610) allows gamers to listen to in-game audio blended with chat simultaneously. It has a standard 3.5 mm headphone plug and is bundled with the Stereo Headset Adapter (Model 1626).

An updated Xbox Stereo Headset, which is styled like the Xbox Wireless Headset and includes a rotary volume control, but not the game/chat mix control dial or the wireless connectivity, was introduced in August 2021.

=== Wireless Headset ===
The Xbox Wireless Headset performs the same task as the Chat Headset and the Stereo Headset, but connects using the same Xbox Wireless protocol as the wireless controller, rather than by a physical connector, allowing it to function within approximately a 30 ft (9.1 m) range and can be used with or without a controller connected to the console. Up to four wireless headsets can be used simultaneously on a single Xbox One, Series X, or Series S. The rotating earcup dials of the headset change volume and game/chat balance, respectively. The headset features a built-in rechargeable battery, which lasts up to 15 hours and comes with a USB-C charger and an instruction manual. The headset fits over both ears and has an adjustable microphone that can be tucked up and out when not in use.
