= Hold 'em (disambiguation) =

Of the three main types of poker (hold 'em, stud and draw), the term "hold 'em" refers to a variant of poker games where community cards are used. The more popular types of hold 'em poker include:

- Texas hold 'em (sometimes it is simply called "hold 'em")
- Omaha hold 'em
- Royal hold 'em

As well as Omaha Express, Tahoe, Super Tahoe, Pineapple, Crazy Pineapple, Grocery Store. There are various other "gimmick" games which are incorrectly referred to as poker such as 727 and In Between.

There are also several Hold 'em poker games introduced in recent years:

- Casino hold 'em

Hold 'em may also refer to:

- E! Hollywood Hold'em: a poker television program
- Hold 'Em (Windows): a Windows version Texas hold 'em game developed by Mobicore
- Texas Hold 'em (video game): an Xbox version Texas hold 'em game developed by TikGames
- Texas Hold 'Em Poker (video game): a Nintendo DS version Texas hold 'em game developed by Skyworks

== See also ==
- Hold'em (film), a 2014 thriller film
- Texas hold 'em (disambiguation)
