= Texas hold 'em (disambiguation) =

Texas hold 'em is a poker game. It may also refer to:

- Texas Hold'em: A Wild Cards Novel (Book Three of the American Triad) - a 2018 mosaic novel in the Wild Cards series edited by George R.R. Martin
- Texas Hold'em Bonus Poker: a card game owned by Mikohn Gaming/Progressive Gaming International Corporation
- Texas Hold 'em: an Xbox version Texas hold 'em game developed by TikGames
- Texas Hold 'Em Poker: a Nintendo DS version Texas hold 'em game developed by Skyworks
- "Texas Hold 'Em" (song) by Beyoncé, from her 2024 album Cowboy Carter

== See also ==
- Hold 'em (disambiguation)
