= Zune software version history =

This is a list of all versions of the Zune software that were released.

The 1.0 versions of the Zune software were a modified version of Windows Media Player 11 while versions since 2.0 are built independently with additional DirectShow decoders for AAC, MPEG-4, and H.264. The current version of the software is 4.8.2345.0 released on August 22, 2011. Several versions of the software have been released.

Firmware version	Software version	Date	Software and firmware changes
1.0 (186) TEST	?	?	Zune 30 device original default (for testing purposes only)
1.0 (193)	?	?	Zune 30 device original default
1.1 (322)	1.0.5341.0	2006-11-14	Added menu item "community" allowing to search for nearby Zunes, see their status, and transfer music and pictures. Improved performance.
1.2 (434)	1.2.5511.0	2006-12-19	Fixed compatibility with Windows Vista and improved browsing performance.
1.3 (482)	1.3.5728.0	2007-03-28	Prevents FM tuner from draining the battery while the device is sleeping. Fixed Zune Marketplace music to not skip on the device. Improved device detection and syncing.
1.4 (485)	?	2007-05-31	Improved shuffling. The dev team states: "this firmware update makes successive shuffle actions produce more random lists."
2.0	?	2007-11-13	Complete re-write of the software and firmware. Inclusion of "Social" features in both. Original device software version that is installed for the Zune 4GB, Zune 8GB, and the Zune 80GB.
2.1	?	?	Enhances device functionality and performance.
2.2	2.1.888.0	2007-11-13	Improved performance and added several new features, including wireless sync and podcast support. New user interface on both the Zune device and the Zune software.
2.3	2.1.888.2	2007-12-18	Resolves an issue in which the battery of the Zune 80 and upgraded Zune 30 would discharge prematurely due to difficulty entering sleep. Also includes improved device recognition and improved stability and reliability on sync (both wirelessly and while connected to a PC). It has also been noted that the new firmware features the option to unsubscribe from a podcast right on the device. This can be activated by bringing up the menu during a podcast play and selecting "unsubscribe". This feature was originally slated to be part of the original consumer release of the 2.x firmware (several reviewers described having this option), but it was removed.
2.4	2.3.1338.0	2008-01-22	Resolves a number of issues including problems with marketplace, podcasts, sync, Xbox streaming, and library problems.
2.5	2.5.447.0	2008-05-06	TV show downloads now available from Marketplace. Also adds new features such as gapless playback, smart playlists, new sorting options, multiple device syncing, and support for XNA (Xbox game developers will be able to load custom code using the XNA platform). Zune Social is better integrated, and users with Windows Live Messenger can display which song is being played to people in their buddy list. Video podcasts can be shared wirelessly between Zunes, allowing the receiving Zune owner to subscribe to a podcast on-the-go.
3.0	3.0.532.0	2008-09-16	Buy from FM allows songs played from FM radio stations to be purchased from the Marketplace (using RDBS data). Wireless hotspot access added for automatically updating the user's collection, browsing the Marketplace, refreshing Channels, exchanging favorites with friends, or buying songs tagged from the device's FM radio. Zune Channels, custom programming stations that deliver personalized playlists to Zune from a variety of sources the user selects (such as music experts, celebrities, or top radio stations), is added. A clock, screen lock feature, and free games (Texas Hold'em and Hexic) are added. The "quick list" has been replaced with a "now playing" list, which functions differently from the previous "quick list".
3.1	3.1.620.0	2008-11-18	Checkers, Sudoku, and Space Battle are added to games. A new multiplayer mode and single-player difficulty levels are added to Texas Hold'em. Visual changes have been made to Zune Social, making it easier to navigate. Like-Minded Listeners feature added to social, allowing users to compare their music tastes to others. Improved play count reporting, content synchronization, and other bug fixes in both the hardware and software.
3.2 (34); 3.2 (35)	4.0.740.0	2009-09-15	Bug fixes, faster operation
4.0 (356)	4.0.740.0	2009-09-15	Zune HD original firmware
4.1 (137)	4.0.740.0	2009-09-19	Bug fixes (Zune HD only)
4.3 (191)	4.0.740.0	2009-11-05	Additional features were added (Zune HD only), new artists view links, mobile or PC view settings in browser as well as auto-correction, auto-capitalization and privacy links, seek to radio presets, and new and updated apps. Unicode support inside the software (e.g. search or editing tags).
3.30 (39)	4.2.202.0	2010-01-26	(Latest for all models except Zune HD.) Bug fixes for play errors, music skipping, faster operation, and compatibility with 4.2 software update. Xvid (.avi) support in software. Smart DJ and Social features removed for all international users.
4.5 (109)	4.2.202.0	2010-04-05	Additional features were added (Zune HD only), Smart DJ, Native AVI and XVID support, Marketplace on TV-Out, Picks on-device, increased performance, browser fixes, favorites sorting, web screenshots, hidden network, no ads on games.
4.5 (109)	4.7.1404.0	2010-10-11	Windows Phone 7 support, integration with Windows Live Essentials 2011, support for content management separate from Windows 7 Libraries, streaming of purchased video content.
4.5 (114)	4.8.2345.0	2011-08-22	Add support for Windows Phone 7.5. Additions and changes also include the increase spacing of the artist and song titles, the addition of a new section in the tagging system called 'Show Sort'. Marketplace changes include section headers have been merged in the Windows Phone app section (i.e. Music + Video). Application tiles have been resized as well in both the Zune and Windows Phone sections.
4.5 (114)	4.8.2345.0	2012-08-31	Apps section removed from Marketplace in software (although they are still downloadable directly to Zune HD devices), Zune Social section removed, Mixview disabled, music videos on Marketplace cannot be re-downloaded, reactivated or relicensed if user's computer is upgraded and are no longer available for purchase or streaming via Zune Music Pass.
