= Xbox Live Arcade Unplugged =

Xbox Live Arcade Unplugged is a series of Xbox 360 games released which allows the play of Xbox Live Arcade games without requiring a purchase via Xbox Live.

== Xbox Live Arcade Unplugged Vol. 1 ==
Xbox Live Arcade Unplugged
- Developer: Various
- Publisher: Microsoft Game Studios
- Platform: Xbox 360
- Release: September 5, 2006
- Genre: Various
- Modes: Single-player, multiplayer

Xbox Live Arcade Unplugged Vol. 1 is a retail package of six Xbox Live Arcade games and three demos.

When the disc is inserted, it does not directly launch anything; instead, it simply adds the respective titles to the player's Games list while inserted.

=== Games included ===
Title	Developer	Live Features
Full Games
Bejeweled 2	PopCap Games / CTXM	Leaderboards
Geometry Wars: Retro Evolved	Bizarre Creations	Leaderboards
Hardwood Backgammon	Silver Creek Entertainment	Leaderboards, Multiplayer, Camera Enabled
Outpost Kaloki X	NinjaBee	Leaderboards, Downloadable Content
Texas Hold 'em	TikGames	Leaderboards, Multiplayer, Camera Enabled
Wik and the Fable of Souls	Reflexive Entertainment	Leaderboards, Multiplayer
Demos
Feeding Frenzy	Sprout Games / CTXM	Leaderboards
Marble Blast Ultra	GarageGames	Leaderboards, Multiplayer
Uno	Carbonated Games	Leaderboards, Multiplayer, Cooperative Play, Camera Enabled, Downloadable Content

== Xbox Live Arcade Compilation Disc ==
Xbox Live Arcade Compilation Disc
- Developer: Various
- Publisher: Microsoft Game Studios
- Platform: Xbox 360
- Release: October 23, 2007
- Genre: Various
- Modes: Single-player, multiplayer

Xbox Live Arcade Compilation Disc is a package of five Xbox Live Arcade games. It was packaged with the console's Arcade variant.

=== Games included ===
Title	Developer	Live Features
Full Games
Boom Boom Rocket	Bizarre Creations	Leaderboards
Feeding Frenzy	PopCap Games	Leaderboards
Luxor 2	MumboJumbo	Leaderboards, Downloadable Content
Pac-Man Championship Edition	Namco Bandai Games	Leaderboards
Uno	Carbonated Games	Leaderboards, Multiplayer, Camera Enabled, Avatars
Demos
3D Ultra Minigolf Adventures	Wanako Games	Multiplayer, Downloadable Content, Camera Enabled, Leaderboards
Frogger	Digital Eclipse	Multiplayer, Leaderboards
Marble Blast Ultra	GarageGames	Leaderboards, Multiplayer
Soltrio Solitaire	Silver Creek Entertainment	Downloadable content, Leaderboards, Camera Enabled
Surf's Up	Ubisoft Quebec	
Viva Piñata	Rare	Multiplayer
Zuma	Oberon Media	

== Xbox Live Arcade Game Pack ==
Xbox Live Arcade Game Pack
- Developer: Various
- Publisher: Microsoft Game Studios
- Platform: Xbox 360
- Release: November 3, 2009
- Genre: Various
- Modes: Single-player, multiplayer

Xbox Live Arcade Game Pack is a package of four Xbox Live Arcade games.

The compilation was packaged with a black wireless controller. Ms. Pac-Man was a digital code.

=== Games included ===
Title	Developer	Live Features
Bomberman Live	Backbone Entertainment	Leaderboards
Geometry Wars: Retro Evolved 2	Bizarre Creations	Leaderboards
Lumines Live!	Q Entertainment	Leaderboards
Ms. Pac-Man	Namco Bandai Games	

== Xbox 360 Triple Pack ==
Xbox 360 Triple Pack
- Developer: Various
- Publisher: Microsoft Game Studios
- Platform: Xbox 360
- Release: April 19, 2011
- Genre: Various
- Mode: Single-player

Xbox 360 Triple Pack is a package of three Xbox Live Arcade games.

=== Games included ===
Title	Developer	Live Features
Limbo	Playdead	Leaderboards
Trials HD	RedLynx	Leaderboards, Sharing custom created tracks
'Splosion Man	Twisted Pixel Games	Leaderboards, Cooperative Play
