= Bankshot Billiards =

2004 video game

- Developer(s): pixelStorm entertainment
- Publisher(s): Oberon Media
- Platform(s): Windows
- Release: WW: October 7, 2004

Bankshot Billiards also known as Backspin Billiards is a cue sports simulation video game developed by Canadian studio PixelStorm, and published by Oberon Media for Windows. Billiards was released in October 2004 worldwide, and re-released in 2006 in the United States. The game featured various simulations of pool games, including 8-ball, 9-ball and trickshots. The game featured 9 different versions of pool, and customisable tables.

In 2005, a sequel in Bankshot Billiards 2 was released for the Xbox Live Arcade.
