= World Series of Poker Adventure =

1992 video game

- Developer: Mojave Software
- Publisher: Mojave Software
- Platform: Windows
- Release: 1992
- Genres: Adventure, digital card game
- Mode: Single-player

World Series of Poker Adventure is a 1992 adventure and casino video game developed and published by Mojave Software for Windows 3.1x.

== Gameplay ==
World Series of Poker Adventure is a game in which the player experiences a Las Vegas casino and competes in the World Series of Poker. The player starts the game with a $5,000 bankroll to play at Binion's Horseshoe, and can explore the casino and play slots, video poker, blackjack, as well as any of three poker variants, seven-card stud, Texas hold 'em and Omaha hold 'em. A menu bar at the top of the screen is used for betting, dealing, holding and drawing.

== Reception ==
Lonnie Brown reviewed the game for Computer Gaming World, and stated that "Many gamblers who go to the tables lose money because they don't know how to play properly. World Series of Poker Adventure can show them how it's done right. And the computer is polite enough to not even chuckle when it rakes in a big pot."

Michael Konik for PCMag praised the game's tournament format, and how well the World Series of Poker is replicated in detail.

L.R. Shannon for The New York Times said that "World Series of Poker Adventure sets a new standard today".
