= Texas Hold'em Bonus Poker =

Texas Hold'em Bonus Poker is a casino table game, owned and licensed by Mikohn Gaming/Progressive Gaming International Corporation. The game is based on traditional multi-player Texas Hold'em poker, but differs in that there is no bet after the river card.

== Rules ==
- The game is played with a standard 52 card deck.
- Each player makes an ante bet and may make an optional separate bonus bet.
- The player and dealer are both dealt two cards (face down).
- After checking his/her cards, the player may fold and forfeit the ante bet or play by betting double the ante.
- Three community cards are then dealt face up to the board (the flop).
- The player may decide to check or bet the amount of the ante.
- Another card is dealt to the board (the turn).
- The player may decide to check or make a final bet of the amount of the ante.
- One last card is dealt to the board (the river).
- The player and dealer make their best five card poker hand from their own two cards and the five board cards.
- If the dealer's hand beats the player's, the player loses all bets (except the bonus bet, which is explained below).
- If the dealer's hand ties the player's, dealer wins.
- If the player's hand beats the dealer's, the player wins even money on the flop, turn and river bets. The player wins even money on the ante bet only if his hand is a straight or better, otherwise the ante bet pushes.
- The bonus bet is based solely on the player's starting hand, regardless of whether the player beats or loses to the dealer. If the player has a pair, A-K, A-Q, or A-J, the player wins according to the pay table, otherwise the bonus bet is lost.

In Atlantic City, New Jersey, there is a variation on the rules above. The player only wins even money on the ante bet if his best hand is a flush or better. This rule also applies in the Star City Casino, Sydney, Australia, and the Seminole Hard Rock Hotel and Casino in Tampa, FL.

== Strategy ==
The optimal strategy for the flop bet, assuming optimal play thereafter, is to call all hands except for 2-3 offsuit, 2-4 offsuit, 2-5 offsuit, 2-6 offsuit and 2-7 offsuit. However, said optimal strategy is extremely complicated because of the large number and variety of possible card combinations. No concise optimal strategy, or even a simplified version thereof, has been published.
