= Alien Sky =

2004 video game

- Developer: KraiSoft Entertainment
- Publishers: KraiSoft Entertainment (Windows); Oberon Media (Xbox)
- Platforms: Windows, Xbox
- Release: Windows; 8 March 2004; Xbox; 4 January 2005
- Genre: Fixed shooter
- Mode: Single-player

Alien Sky is a 2004 fixed shooter video game developed by New Zealand studio KraiSoft Entertainment. Originally distributed as shareware for Microsoft Windows on 8 March 2004, it was later included in the launch line-up of Xbox Live Arcade for the original Xbox on 4 January 2005, where it was sold digitally by Oberon Media.

== Gameplay ==
The players control a starfighter that can move horizontally along the bottom of the screen while firing upward at waves of aliens reminiscent of Space Invaders and Galaga. Power-ups award temporary weapons—including laser cannons, homing missiles and screen-clearing nuclear bombs—while certain enemy types erect barriers, steal power-ups or ram the player, requiring different tactics. The campaign is divided into ten missions, each ending with an oversized boss encounter; high scores may be uploaded to a worldwide leaderboard.

== Development and release ==
KraiSoft Entertainment designed Alien Sky as an arcade homage built with in-house tools. Following its 2004 Windows debut, Russian publisher Noviy Disk issued a boxed edition titled Alien Sky. Vrashdebnye nebesa (Враждебные небеса). Microsoft later licensed the game for the original Xbox’s fledgling Xbox Live Arcade service, bundling a time-limited demo on the 2004/2005 Xbox Live Starter Pack disc and offering the full version via digital download.

== Reception ==
The Windows edition holds an average critic rating of 74% on MobyGames, based on five contemporary reviews. Andrew Williams of Bytten praised its “solid, colourful action”, but felt later stages became repetitive. Retrospectives on early Xbox Live Arcade line-ups note the title’s faithful retro design and modest production values.
