= Bankshot Billiards 2 =

2005 video game

- Developer: PixelStorm
- Publisher: PixelStorm
- Platform: Xbox 360 (XBLA)
- Release: November 22, 2005
- Genre: Sports simulation – pool
- Modes: Single player, Multiplayer

Bankshot Billiards 2 is a Sports simulation video game developed by PixelStorm, as a sequel to Bankshot Billiards. It was released on November 22, 2005, on Xbox Live Arcade. The pool (pocket billiards) simulator offers nine different game modes including nine-ball, eight-ball, Euro eight-ball (blackball), cutthroat, 14.1 continuous (straight pool), three-ball, trick shots, "Time Trial" (speed pool), and golf. It offers a wide range of graphic customization including table style, felt color, wood grain, ball set, and cue stick.

Support for the Xbox Live Vision Camera was added on September 20, 2006.

On December 4, 2007, Bankshot Billiards 2 was declared an "XBLA Hit" and received a reduction in price.

== Multiplayer mode ==
Bankshot Billiards 2 offers multiplayer play. Two players can play against each other via Xbox Live or on the same console.

== Reception ==
Reception

Aggregate score
Aggregator	Score
Metacritic	65/100

Review scores
Publication	Score
GameSpot	4.2/10
GamesRadar+	3.5/5
IGN	7.5/10
TeamXbox	8/10

Bankshot Billiards 2 received mixed reviews from critics. On Metacritic, the game holds a score of 65/100 based on 15 reviews.

The game received praise for its physics, variety of game modes and visual customization, but was criticized for inconsistent opponent AI and repetitive soundtrack. It was also criticized for its launch price, 1200 Microsoft Points (US$15), which made it the most expensive Xbox Live Arcade game at the time of its release.
