= Aegis Wing =

2007 video game

- Developer(s): Carbonated Games, Microsoft
- Publisher(s): Microsoft Game Studios
- Platform(s): Xbox 360
- Release: May 16, 2007
- Genre(s): Scrolling shooter
- Mode(s): Single-player, multiplayer

Aegis Wing is a 2007 scrolling shooter video game developed by Carbonated Games and three independent Microsoft interns for the Xbox Live Arcade. The game was released worldwide on May 16, 2007, available free to all Xbox Live members in North America.

As of January 21, 2016, it remains as an Xbox One Backwards Compatible title. It has remained free as a digital download on the Xbox One, Xbox Series X and Series S.

== Gameplay ==
Typical gameplay screenshot of Aegis Wing.

Aegis Wing is a side-view scrolling shooter, where the player controls a small ship pitted against countless foes. While the scrolling backgrounds in the game are strictly non-interactive, the player must also avoid stationary mines positioned at certain points. There is a boss at the end of some stages, requiring numerous shots to defeat.

While the ship has only a single non-upgradeable main weapon, the player can collect one of four power-ups to grant access to a super weapon with a limited number of uses. Only a single super weapon can be carried at once

The title supports up to four players playing cooperatively, either on the same console or via Xbox Live. If more than one player is playing, players can choose to temporarily attach their ship to that of their allies. When this occurs, one player pilots the combined ship, while the remaining player(s) are able to fire in a 360-degree arc. The super weapons become more powerful with each ship added to the formation. In co-op, when a player dies, destroyed enemies sometimes leave behind a "back ship" power-up; the surviving players can pick this up to resurrect one of their dead teammates.

== Plot ==
The game takes place in 2105 where the Earth's environment is devastated and humankind travels through space in search of a new home world. Upon finding and settling upon the planet Europa, the human colonists are attacked by the space military of an alien colony-people known as the Araxians. After studying downed Araxian fighter technology, the humans develop a powerful space ship capable of using great firepower to be used against the Araxia in the war for Europa.

== Development ==
According to an IGN developer's spotlight, the game was created when Microsoft's J Allard proposed a summer internship focused on game design. In response, three Microsoft interns, Scott Brodie, Danny Dyer and Matt Monson, created Aegis Wing in the summer of 2006. Dyer and Monson had been active members of the Texas Aggie Game Developers, a student organization at Texas A&M University that encourages video game development among students. The three did all of the initial development work within their small team, although with artwork and audio support from other sources. The game was later brought to Xbox Live Arcade with assistance from Carbonated Games.

As the Microsoft XNA toolkit was not yet ready when the team began work, the team was required to create several of their own tools. Due to the limited time period available (i.e., just 3 months), they were also forced to remove certain features in order to maintain their schedule. For example, a planned ability to allow players to merge their ships in multiple configurations was scaled back to a more-manageable single configuration. Nonetheless, the interns were able to finish their work on Aegis Wing by the end of the summer, handing the game off to Carbonated Games for final polish before release.

== Reception ==
Reception

Aggregate score
Aggregator	Score
Metacritic	58/100

Aegis Wing has received "mixed or average" reviews according to video game review aggregator Metacritic.
