= List of Xbox 360 retail configurations =

The Xbox 360 video game console has appeared in various retail configurations during its life-cycle. At its launch, the Xbox 360 was available in two retail configurations: the morning "Xbox 360" package (unofficially known as the 20 GB Pro or Premium), priced at US$399.99 or £279.99, and the "Xbox 360 Core," priced at US$299.99 and £209.99. The original shipment of Xbox 360s included a cut-down version of the Media Remote as a promotion. The Elite package was launched later at a retail price of US$479.99. The "Xbox 360 Core" was replaced by the "Xbox 360 Arcade" in October 2007 and a 60 GB version of the Xbox 360 Pro was released on August 1, 2008. The Pro package was discontinued and marked down to US$249.99 on August 28, 2009 to be sold until stock ran out, while the Elite was also marked down in price to US$299.99. In June 2010, Microsoft announced a new, redesigned model and the discontinuation of the Elite and Arcade models.

== Models ==
=== Xbox 360 ===
==== Xbox 360 ====
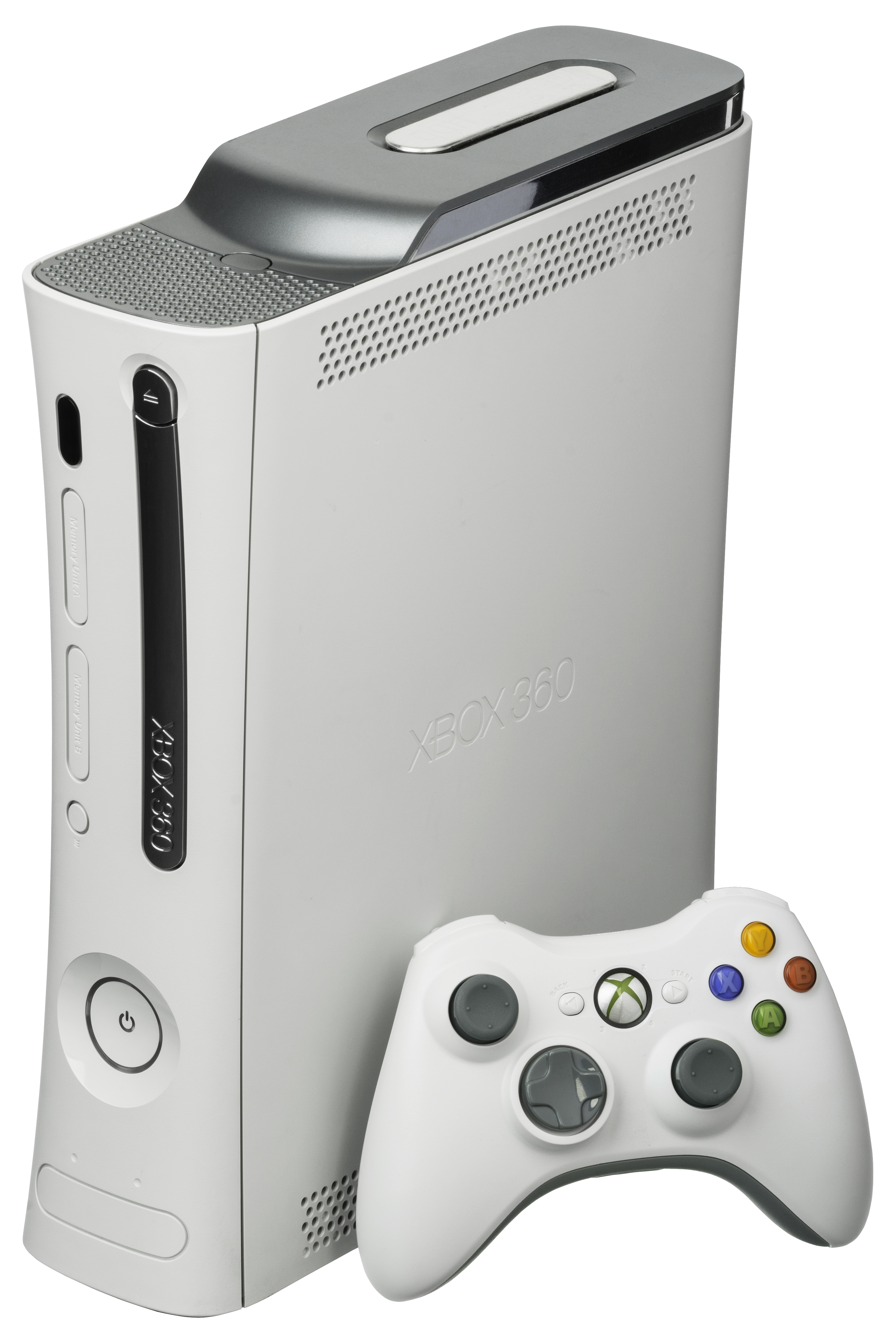
Xbox 360 Pro console with white wireless controller

The Xbox 360 (also known as Pro or Premium and packaged as simply Xbox 360 with the subheading "Go Pro") included all the features of the Xbox 360 Core (with the exception of the disc tray which is silver instead of white) and included a hybrid composite/component cable with optional optical out instead of the composite A/V cable included with the Core. This model also included a detachable hard disk drive (initially 20 GB, while later models had 60 GB) to store downloaded content, provide compatibility with original Xbox games, and store game data. The included hard drive came with game demos, video clips and the free Xbox Live Arcade game Hexic HD. In July 2007, this version of the Xbox 360 began appearing with the Zephyr motherboard (the motherboard used in the Elite) which features an HDMI output and an improved GPU heatsink. Although this model did include an HDMI output, it did not come with an HDMI cable. Starting at the end of September 2007, the newest systems were shipped with the new "Falcon" motherboard. This motherboard includes the new 65 nm CPUs, making them quieter and cooler than the older systems. On August 1, 2008, the 20 GB version was discontinued and was replaced by a 60 GB HDD model at the same price. Holiday 2007 consoles were bundled with Forza Motorsport 2 and Marvel: Ultimate Alliance. Holiday 2008 consoles were bundled with Lego Indiana Jones: The Original Adventures and Kung Fu Panda. Price cuts that took effect on September 4, 2008 reduced the price from $349.99 to $299.99. The Xbox 360 configuration, following its discontinuation, retailed for $250 until stocks were exhausted.

==== Xbox 360 Core ====
The Xbox 360 Core was an entry level Xbox 360 which was later replaced with the "Arcade". Although available at launch in other regions, it was not available in Japan until November 2, 2006. The Core system came bundled with a composite video cable, capable of only SDTV resolutions. The console was however capable of the same HDTV resolutions (up to 1080i) as the other models when connected to a separately sold component/d-terminal cable. In October 2006, 1080p support was added for all models in a system update, including the "Core" using either the component/d-terminal cable, or the new VGA cable (although 1080p via component was not widely supported by televisions). It also has a white disc tray that matches the console, while it may also utilize a separately sold Xbox 360 hard disk drive. Unlike all other SKUs, it shipped with a wired version of the Xbox 360 controller, instead of the wireless version found in other SKUs.

==== Xbox 360 Arcade ====
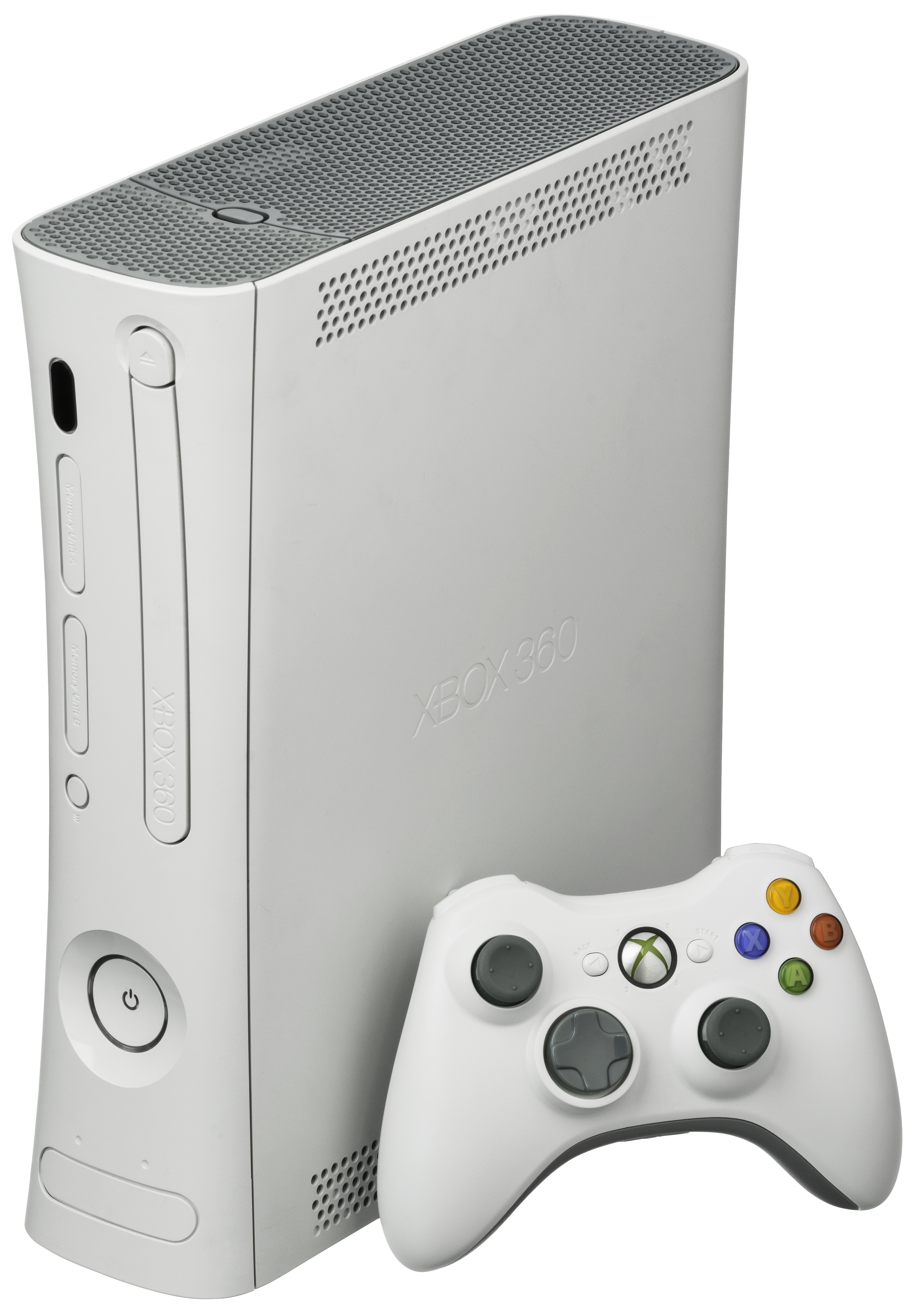
Xbox 360 Arcade console with white wireless controller. The Arcade is cosmetically identical to the Core model.

The Xbox 360 Arcade (packaged with the subheading "Go Play") replaced the Xbox 360 Core as the entry-level Xbox 360 on September 20, 2007, while retaining the Core's price of US$279.99. It was publicly revealed by Microsoft's president of Entertainment Devices division Robbie Bach to the Financial Times on October 18, 2007, and officially announced on October 22, 2007, although it was available in stores far earlier. It included a wireless controller, a composite A/V cable, an HDMI output, a 256 MB memory unit and five Xbox Live Arcade titles: Boom Boom Rocket, Feeding Frenzy, Luxor 2, Pac-Man Championship Edition, and Uno on a single disc, which also included a "Welcome Video" and several game trailers and demos. Like its predecessor the "Core", it has a white disc tray, and did not include an Xbox 360 hard disk drive, which is required for Xbox software backwards compatibility. The main difference between the Arcade and the Core is that the Arcade has an HDMI port, while the Core doesn't. In Fall 2008, with the introduction of the Jasper motherboard revision, the memory unit was removed from the package and replaced with a 256 MB internal memory chip. This was later upgraded to a 512 MB chip in Summer 2009. Holiday 2008 consoles were bundled with Sega Superstars Tennis. With the price cuts on September 4, 2008, the Arcade fell from US$279 to US$199 in the US. In the UK, with the 2009 Elite price drop and discontinuation of the Pro SKU, the Arcade price rose from £129.99 to £159.99. With the announcement of the new 4 GB Xbox 360 model, the Arcade dropped in price to US$149.99 for remaining units until stocks are exhausted.

==== Xbox 360 Elite ====
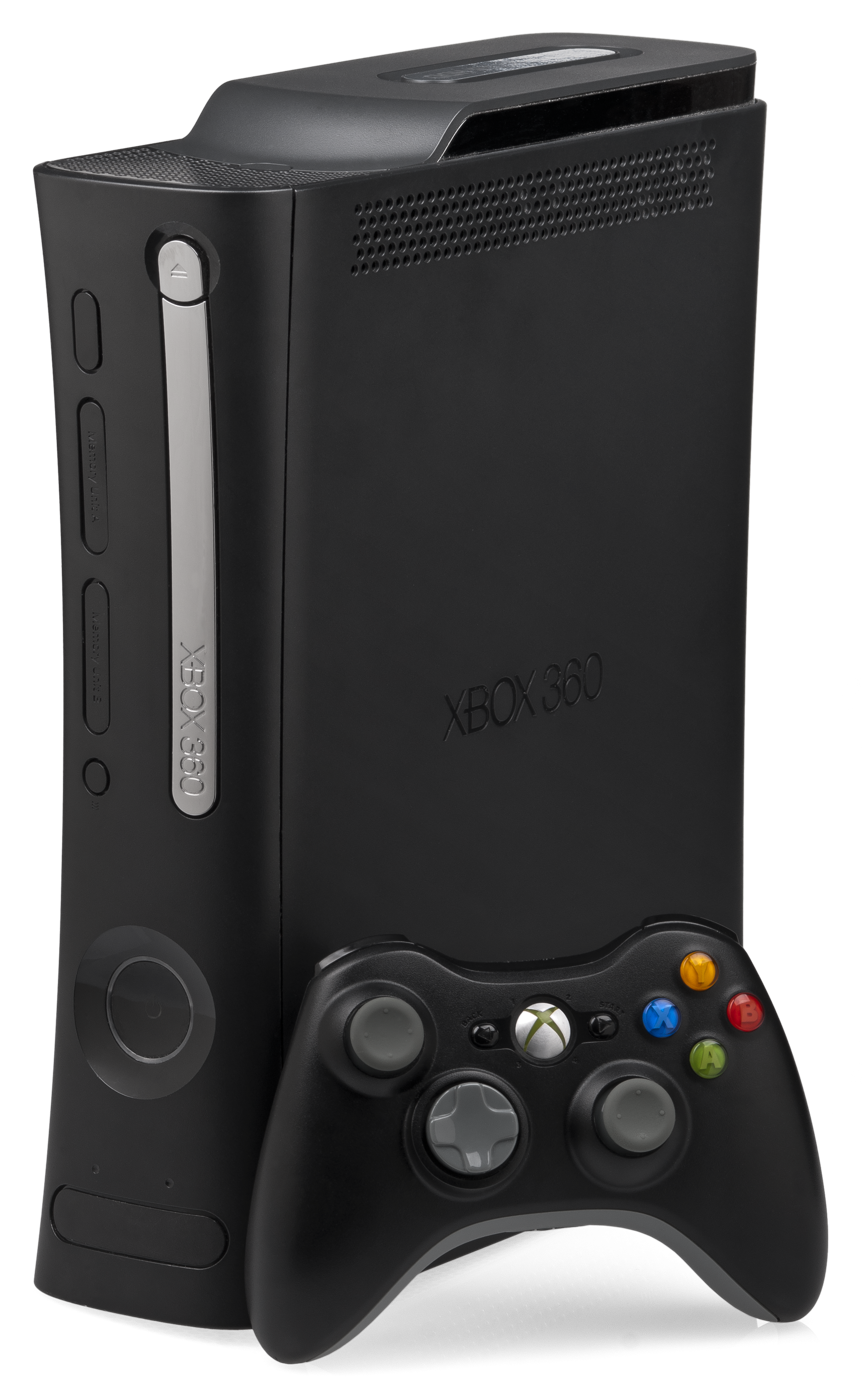
Xbox 360 Elite console with black wireless controller

The Xbox 360 Elite (sometimes packaged with the subheading "Go Big") included a 120 GB hard drive and a matte black finish. The Elite retail package also included a controller and headset that match the system's black finish. All Elites made before September 2009 also came with a component HD A/V cable and an HDMI cable. The initial release price was US$479.99, C$549.99, £299.99, and A$729.95. The Elite was released in North America on April 29, 2007, Europe on August 24, 2007, and Australia on August 30, 2007. These Elites (and other Xbox 360 models using the Falcon motherboard) can be identified from earlier versions by a re-designed power connector and a power supply rated to 175 W. In 2009, Elite models using the Jasper motherboard became available. These can also be identified by their power supply, which is rated at 150W and has a 12.1A 12v rail. Holiday 2007 consoles were bundled with Forza Motorsport 2 and Marvel: Ultimate Alliance. Holiday 2008 consoles were bundled with Lego Indiana Jones: The Original Adventures and Kung Fu Panda. Holiday 2009 consoles were bundled with Lego Batman and Pure. The Elite's price tag was cut from $449 to $399 on September 4, 2008. With the announcement of the new 250 GB Xbox 360 model, the Elite dropped in price to US$249.99 for remaining units until stocks were exhausted.

=== Xbox 360 S ===
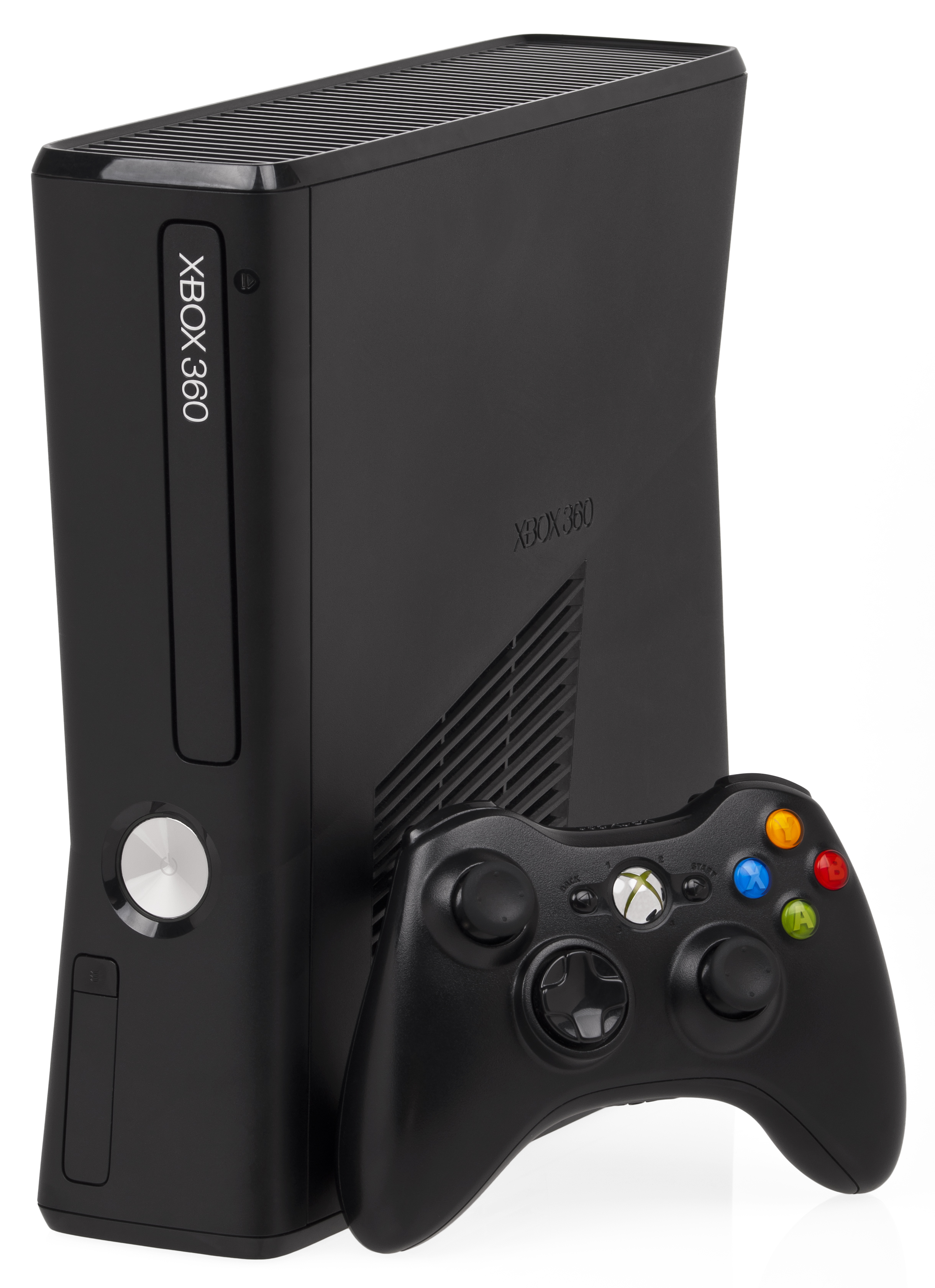
Xbox 360 S console (Matte black)

Technically designated the Xbox 360 S, commonly known as the Xbox 360 Slim, and marketed simply as the Xbox 360; these Xbox 360 consoles are based on a redesign of the Xbox 360 hardware which was officially announced on June 14, 2010 during a press briefing prior to that year's E3. It was speculated that a complete redesign of the Xbox 360 hardware was being produced after pictures of a possible new motherboard design surfaced on March 17, 2010. Ads later surfaced on June 13, 2010 showing a slimmer Xbox 360 design, which was expected to include a 250 GB hard drive and integrated Wi-Fi functionality.

The console's casing is revised in comparison to the previous models, with a glossy black finish and capacitive power and eject buttons. Sounds are played when the power is turned on or off and when the disc tray is opened or closed. The internal hardware was redesigned using a new motherboard codenamed "Valhalla", which integrates the CPU, GPU, and eDRAM into a single package using a 45 nm fabrication process. As the CPU and GPU are integrated into the same die, they may also share the same heatsink and fan, which reduces the console's noise output, and its power consumption by roughly half in comparison to the original Xenon motherboard. The S has two additional rear USB ports, as well as a proprietary port used to connect the Kinect sensor.

The motherboard has an integrated 2.4 GHz 802.11 b/g/n Wi-Fi adapter, and a TOSLINK S/PDIF optical audio connector. The S no longer includes Memory Unit slots; USB drives can alternatively be used to expand storage. The external hard disk drive connector has also been swapped for an internal bay for use with a proprietary hard drive. The hard drive bay is designed such that a specially formatted 2.5" hard drive may be loaded in. Data can be transferred from a previous console using a USB transfer cable sold separately. If removed from its casing, a hard drive from a previous generation Xbox 360 can be implanted into the drive bay instead of purchasing a hard drive branded for use with the new model.

Unlike previous generations of the console which had names to distinguish different SKUs, the new models' retail units were branded by their internal storage capacity in a similar fashion to the various models of its main competitor the PlayStation 3. When the first new models began to ship, remaining stock of the Elite package dropped in price to US$249.99 or A$349 and the Arcade dropped to US$149.99.

The first Xbox 360 S SKU revealed included a 250 GB hard drive and its casing featured a glossy black finish. It was shipped to US retailers the same day it was announced (June 14, 2010) and went on sale later that week. It was released in Australia on July 1, 2010, in New Zealand on July 8, 2010 and in Europe on July 16, 2010. It retails at US$299.99, £199.99, A$449.00, NZ$499.00 or €249.00, replacing the Xbox 360 Elite at that price point.

A second SKU which included 4 GB of internal flash storage and had a matte black casing (much like the Xbox 360 Elite) was released on August 3, 2010 in the US and August 20, 2010 in Europe. It replaced the Xbox 360 Arcade and is priced at US$199.99, £149.99 or €199.99. Although this model has onboard storage, Xbox Product Director Aaron Greenberg confirmed that it does have a drive bay which Microsoft has "the opportunity to use in the future". On August 20, 2010, Microsoft announced a 250 GB stand-alone hard drive for use with Xbox 360 S models priced at US$129.99.

In August 2011, Microsoft announced they would be streamlining their models by discontinuing the glossy finish and that future 250 GB consoles would use the matte finish found on 4 GB models.

=== Xbox 360 E ===
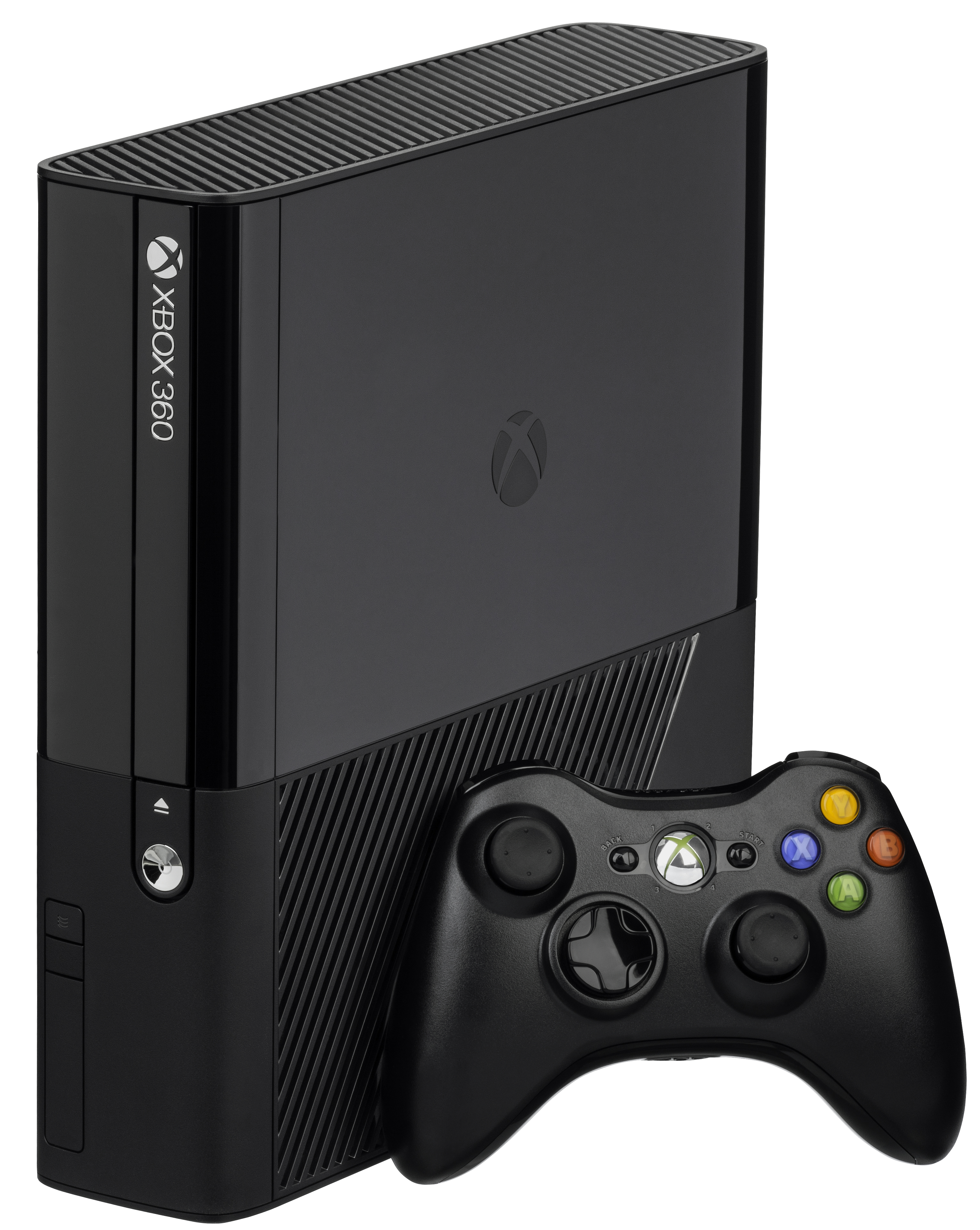
The Xbox 360 E, restyled with design traits of the Xbox One

At Microsoft's E3 press conference on June 10, 2013, another hardware revision of the Xbox 360 known as Xbox 360 E was unveiled for immediate availability. It is a revision of the S model with a new Xbox One-inspired casing, carrying a more rectangular appearance and a two-tone color scheme. It has one fewer USB port and no S/PDIF, YPbPr component or S-video connections. Its internal hardware is otherwise similar to the S model. SKUs and pricing for the new model are identical to those of the previous model.

== Comparison of features ==
Information is based on current specifications for standard packages. Older or holiday packages may differ from current configurations.

Model	Storage	HDMI	Appearance	Headset	Other accessories/bundled items		MSRP	First available
Xbox 360 Core	None	No	Matte white Matte white disc tray	No	Wired controller (matte white); Composite A/V Cable^{[b]}		US$299.99, £199.99, ¥27,800	WW: 2005-11-22
Xbox 360 Arcade	512 MB onboard	Yes	Matte white Matte white disc tray	No	Wireless controller (matte white); Component HD A/V Cable^{[b]}; Xbox Live Arcade compilation disc^{[e]} (not included with all units)		US$199.99, C$149.99, £159.99, €179.99, ¥19,800, A$299.00	WW: 2009-06
Xbox 360 Arcade	256 MB onboard	Yes	Matte white Matte white disc tray	No	Wireless controller (matte white); Component HD A/V Cable^{[b]}; Xbox Live Arcade compilation disc^{[e]} (not included with all units)		US$199.99, C$149.99, £159.99, €179.99, ¥19,800, A$299.00	WW: 2008-12
Xbox 360 Arcade	256 MB memory unit	Yes	Matte white Matte white disc tray	No	Wireless controller (matte white); Component HD A/V Cable^{[b]}; Xbox Live Arcade compilation disc^{[e]} (not included with all units)		US$199.99, C$149.99, £159.99, €179.99, ¥19,800, A$299.00	WW: 2007-10-23
Xbox 360 Pro	60 GB HDD	Yes	Matte white Chrome disc tray	Yes ^{[f]}	Wireless controller (matte white); Ethernet cable; Component HD A/V Cable^{[c]}^{[h]}		US$399.99, C$299.99, £169.99, €239.99, ¥29,800, A$399.00	WW: 2008-09-01
Xbox 360 Pro	20 GB HDD	Yes	Matte white Chrome disc tray	Yes ^{[f]}	Wireless controller (matte white); Ethernet cable; Component HD A/V Cable^{[c]}^{[h]}		US$399.99, C$299.99, £169.99, €239.99, ¥29,800, A$399.00	WW: 2007-09
Xbox 360 Pro	20 GB HDD	No	Matte white Chrome disc tray	Yes ^{[f]}	Wireless controller (matte white); Ethernet cable; Component HD A/V Cable^{[c]}^{[h]}		US$399.99, C$299.99, £169.99, €239.99, ¥29,800, A$399.00	WW: 2005-11-22
Xbox 360 Elite	250 GB HDD^{[a]}	Yes	Matte black with Modern Warfare 2 branding Matte black disc tray	Yes	2 wireless controllers (matte black); Ethernet cable; Component HD A/V Cable^{[b]}^{[g]}	Call of Duty: Modern Warfare 2	US$399.99, C$399.99, £249.99, €329.99, A$599.00	WW: 2009-11-10
Xbox 360 Elite	250 GB HDD^{[a]}	Yes	Matte black Chrome disc tray	Yes	2 wireless controllers (matte black); Ethernet cable; Component HD A/V Cable^{[b]}^{[g]}	Forza Motorsport 3	US$399.99, C$399.99, £249.99, €329.99, A$599.00	WW: 2009-10-27
Xbox 360 Elite	250 GB HDD^{[a]}	Yes	Matte black Chrome disc tray	Yes	2 wireless controllers (matte black); Ethernet cable; Component HD A/V Cable^{[b]}^{[g]}	Halo 3 and Halo 3: ODST	C$399.99	CAN: 2010-01-09
Xbox 360 Elite	250 GB HDD^{[a]}	Yes	Matte white Chrome disc tray	Yes	2 wireless controllers (matte black); Ethernet cable; Component HD A/V Cable^{[b]}^{[g]}	Final Fantasy XIII; Additional faceplate with FFXIII based artwork	US$399.99, C$399.99, £249.99, €329.99, A$599.00	WW: 2010-03-09
Xbox 360 Elite	250 GB HDD^{[a]}	Yes	Matte black Chrome disc tray	Yes	2 wireless controllers (matte black); Ethernet cable; Component HD A/V Cable^{[b]}^{[g]}	Tom Clancy's Splinter Cell: Conviction	US$399.99, C$399.99, £249.99, €329.99, A$599.00	WW: 2010-04-13
Xbox 360 Elite	120 GB HDD	Yes	Matte black Chrome disc tray	Yes	Wireless controller (matte black); Ethernet cable; Component HD A/V Cable^{[b]}^{[g]}; HDMI cable		US$299.99, C$299.99, £199.99, €299.99 ¥29,800, A$549.00	NA: 2007-04-29; EU: 2007-08-24; AU: 2007-08-30
Xbox 360 S	320 GB HDD^{[a]}	Yes	Metallic red with black Gears of War 3 branding	Yes	1 or 2 wireless controllers with "transforming D-pad"^{[i]}; Composite A/V Cable^{[b]}; For details of bundle specifics, see Xbox 360 S special editions below		US$399.99	WW: 2011-09-20
Xbox 360 S	320 GB HDD^{[a]}	Yes	Matte blue and white R2-D2 artwork; blue ring of light	Yes	1 or 2 wireless controllers with "transforming D-pad"^{[i]}; Composite A/V Cable^{[b]}; For details of bundle specifics, see Xbox 360 S special editions below		US$449.99, £349.99	WW: 2012-04-03
Xbox 360 S	320 GB HDD^{[a]}	Yes	Matte grey and dark grey with white Modern Warfare 3 branding	Yes	1 or 2 wireless controllers with "transforming D-pad"^{[i]}; Composite A/V Cable^{[b]}; For details of bundle specifics, see Xbox 360 S special editions below		US$399	WW: 2011-11-08
Xbox 360 S	320 GB HDD^{[a]}	Yes	Translucent dark grey with blue and white Halo 4 artwork; blue ring of light	Yes	1 or 2 wireless controllers with "transforming D-pad"^{[i]}; Composite A/V Cable^{[b]}; For details of bundle specifics, see Xbox 360 S special editions below		US$399.99	WW: 2012-11-06
Xbox 360 S	250 GB HDD	Yes	Matte black	No	Wireless controller (glossy black); Composite A/V Cable^{[b]}		US$299.99, C$299.99, £199.99, €249.99, A$449.00, NZ$499.00	WW: 2011-08
Xbox 360 S	250 GB HDD	Yes	Glossy black	Yes	Wireless controller (glossy black); Composite A/V Cable^{[b]}		US$299.99, C$299.99, £199.99, €249.99, A$449.00, NZ$499.00	NA: 2010-06-18; AU: 2010-07-01; NZ: 2010-07-08; EU: 2010-07-16
Xbox 360 S	4 GB onboard	Yes	Matte black	No	Wireless controller (glossy black); Composite A/V Cable^{[b]}		US$199.99, £149.99, C$199.99	NA: 2010-08-03; EU: 2010-08-20
Xbox 360 S	4 GB onboard	Yes	Glossy white	No	Wireless controller (glossy white); Composite A/V Cable^{[b]}; Kinect sensor (glossy white); Kinect Adventures and Kinect Sports; 3-month Xbox Live Gold subscription		US$299.99	WW: 2012-02-28
Xbox 360 E	250 GB HDD	Yes	Two-tone black	No	Wireless controller (glossy black); Composite A/V Cable		US$299.99, C$299.99, £199.99, €249.99, A$449.00, NZ$499.00	NA: 2013-06-10; EU: 2013-06-20
Xbox 360 E	4 GB onboard	Yes	Two-tone black	No	Wireless controller (glossy black); Composite A/V Cable		US$299.99, C$299.99, £199.99, €249.99, A$449.00, NZ$499.00	NA: 2013-06-10; EU: 2013-06-20

All Xbox 360s come with Xbox Live Free membership (Prior to October 2010, the free service was known as Xbox Live Silver) and a one-month trial of Xbox Live Gold membership (only new accounts are eligible).
All Xbox 360s are backwards compatible with supported Xbox titles as long as they have an Xbox 360 HDD attached. This can be purchased separately for the Core/Arcade pack.
All hard drives (included with a console or bought separately) come with the Xbox Live Arcade game Hexic HD.
Included accessories match the color scheme of the console they are bundled with.
All European consoles also include a composite SCART adapter (Advanced SCART A/V Cable sold separately).

a 250 GB Elite consoles and 320 GB Xbox 360 S consoles are/were only available as part of limited/special edition bundles (see below).
b The standard Composite A/V Cable features three RCA connectors, for standard left and right channel audio and composite video, which supports an SD image (NTSC on NTSC consoles, PAL and PAL60 on PAL consoles). It also lacks the TOSLINK connector found on all other (pre-2010) A/V cables (including the Component HD A/V Cable).
c The Component HD A/V Cable features six RCA connectors, for standard left and right channel audio, composite video and HD component (YP_{B}P_{R}) supporting up to 1080p image. It also features a TOSLINK optical audio connector, which supports either 2 channel (stereo) LPCM or dolby digital 5.1.
d The audio dongle features two RCA connectors for left and right audio and a TOSLINK optical audio connector.

e Compilation disc includes Boom Boom Rocket, Feeding Frenzy, Luxor 2, Pac-Man Championship Edition, and Uno.

f Excluding Mexican and older Australian and New Zealand versions, where a Media Remote is bundled instead.
g Component HD A/V Cable,^{[c]}^{[h]} HDMI cable and HDMI Audio Adapter^{[d]} were included with the 120 GB model prior to September 2009.
h Component HD A/V Cable is replaced with a D-Terminal HD A/V Cable (D 端子 HD A/V ケーブル) in Japan.
i "Transforming D-pad" controllers feature a D-pad that can be rotated to switch between either a "plus" (4-way) or a "disc" (8-way) D-pad. These controllers also feature different concave analog stick tops than standard controllers.

== Special editions ==
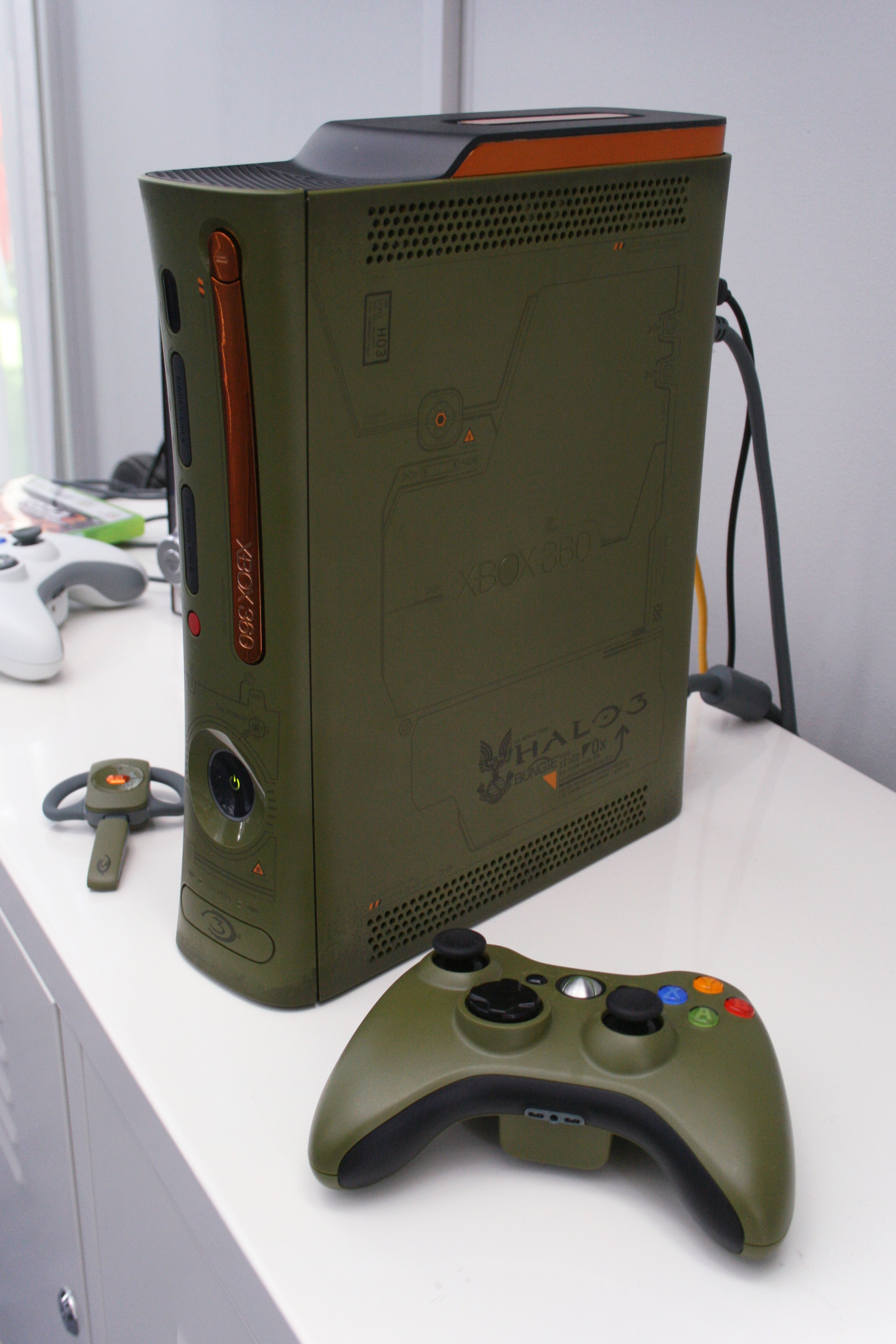
Halo 3 special edition

On a few occasions, Microsoft has produced special editions of the console, usually to coincide with the release of a major product. These special editions are typically custom-colored Xbox 360 models, and are produced in limited numbers.

=== Xbox 360 Pro special editions ===
- At the E3 2007 press conference, Microsoft announced the Halo 3 Special Edition Xbox 360 Pro console, released September 25, 2007, along with the game. It sports a Halo 3 theme on the console, a wired headset, a wireless controller, and a Play & Charge Kit. Other than the unique "Spartan green-and-gold" color scheme, it also features an exclusive dashboard theme and downloads, and an HDMI output, its features were unusual in that it had the HDMI output present only on the Elite, but the 20 GB hard drive of the Pro (Halo 3 imprinted where HDD size imprint goes). It is priced at US$399.99 and £279.99 (the original price of the Xbox 360).
- To promote The Simpsons Movie, Microsoft created a specially designed, yellow Xbox 360 Pro console with The Simpsons Movie based artwork. The configuration was based on the Xbox 360 package of the time, the only difference being the color scheme of the Xbox 360 console and wireless controller. The consoles were to be given out to winners of drawings taking place between July 18, 2007 and July 27, 2007, in which a name was randomly drawn each day in the "10 Days and 10 Chances to Win" sweepstakes. 100 consoles were produced in total.

=== Xbox 360 Elite special editions ===
==== 120 GB models ====
- A Resident Evil 5 limited-edition bundle was released on March 13, 2009, coinciding with the release of the game. The bundle contains a red 120 GB Xbox 360 Elite, a red wireless controller, a black wired headset, an Ethernet cable, a standard definition composite A/V cable, an HDMI cable, a physical copy of the game, an exclusive dashboard theme, and a digital voucher to download Super Street Fighter II Turbo HD Remix from the Xbox Live Marketplace.

==== 250 GB models ====
- On September 15, 2009 Activision and Microsoft jointly announced a special 250 GB hard drive limited-edition version of the Xbox 360 Elite for Call of Duty: Modern Warfare 2. The unit is highlighted by special game product branding and includes two black wireless controllers, a black wired headset, an Ethernet cable, a standard definition composite A/V cable, and a physical copy of the game in the standard version. This was the first Xbox 360 announced to come with a 250 GB hard drive.
- On September 17, 2009, Microsoft announced a special limited-edition black Xbox 360 Elite console for Forza Motorsport 3. The unit includes a 250 GB hard drive, two black wireless controllers, a black wired headset, an Ethernet cable, a standard definition composite A/V cable, and a physical copy of the game in the standard version.
- In January 2010, Microsoft announced a special limited-edition black Xbox 360 Elite console with a 250 GB hard drive, two black wireless controllers, a black wired headset, an Ethernet cable, a standard definition composite A/V cable, and physical copies of Halo 3 and Halo 3: ODST. The bundle was sold exclusively in Canada.
- A Final Fantasy XIII limited-edition bundle was announced on February 11, 2010 and was released to coincide with the release of Final Fantasy XIII (March 9, 2010). The bundle includes an imprinted white 250 GB Xbox 360 Elite (Final Fantasy XIII imprinted where HDD size imprint goes), two white wireless controllers, a black wired headset, an Ethernet cable, a standard definition composite A/V cable, an additional faceplate with Final Fantasy XIII based artwork, a physical copy of the game, and exclusive downloadable avatar items. Other than the HDD imprint, this console is cosmetically identical to the discontinued Pro models.
- In March 2010, Microsoft announced a special limited-edition black Xbox 360 Elite console for Tom Clancy's Splinter Cell: Conviction. The unit includes a 250 GB hard drive, two black wireless controllers, a black wired headset, an Ethernet cable, a standard definition composite A/V cable, and a physical copy of the game in the standard version.

=== Xbox 360 S special editions ===
==== 250 GB models ====
- A Halo: Reach special-edition bundle was made available concurrently with the game on September 14, 2010. It consists of a custom Halo: Reach branded silver 250 GB Xbox 360 S console, two silver and black branded controllers, a black wired headset, and a physical copy of the game. The press release in which it was announced also revealed that it not only captures the look and feel of the game, but also features custom sound effects from the Halo universe that are played when the console is switched on and off or when the disc tray is opened and closed. The bundle retailed for US$399. The branded controllers were also sold as standalone products.

==== 320 GB models ====
- On June 7, 2011, Microsoft announced a "Limited Collector's Edition" (LCE) Xbox 360 S console to coincide with the launch of Gears of War 3 (September 20, 2011). The console features a metallic red finish with black Gears of War 3 branding. Unlike other Xbox 360 consoles, the Gears of War 3 LCE features a 320 GB hard drive, and sounds from the Gears of War 3 game are played when the console is switched on and off or the disc tray is opened and closed. It is bundled with two custom branded glossy red Gears of War 3 wireless controllers (each with a transforming D-pad), a black wired headset, and a physical copy of the game in the standard version with a download code for additional in-game content.
- On July 21, 2011, Microsoft announced the "Limited Edition Kinect Star Wars Bundle". The bundle includes a 320 GB Xbox 360 S console, which features R2-D2 based artwork and custom R2-D2 themed power on and off/tray eject sounds and a ring of light that glows blue instead of green, a white Kinect sensor, a gold and black C-3PO themed wireless controller (with a transforming D-pad), a black wired headset, and physical copies of Kinect Star Wars (with exclusive downloadable content) and Kinect Adventures. The bundle was released on April 3, 2012.
- On September 2, 2011, Microsoft announced the "Limited Edition Call of Duty: Modern Warfare 3 Bundle". The bundle was released on November 8, 2011, alongside the game. It includes a 320 GB Xbox 360 S console, which features Modern Warfare 3 based artwork and custom Modern Warfare 3 themed power on and off/tray eject sounds, two Modern Warfare 3 themed wireless controllers (each with a transforming D-pad), a black wired headset, a physical copy of the game in the standard version, and a one-month subscription to Xbox Live Gold.
- On July 14, 2012, Microsoft announced the "Limited Edition Halo 4 Bundle". The bundle was released on November 6, 2012, alongside the game. It includes a 320 GB Xbox 360 S, featuring a translucent case with Halo 4 based artwork and custom Halo 4 themed power on and off/tray eject sounds, two exclusive Halo 4 themed wireless controllers (each with a transforming D-pad), a black wired headset, and a physical copy of the game with exclusive DLC. The ring of light on this console and its accompanying controllers are blue rather than the green found on other Xbox 360 models.

==== 4 GB models ====
- On February 28, 2012, Microsoft announced the "Special Edition 4 GB Kinect Family Bundle". The bundle includes a glossy white Xbox 360 S console with a 4 GB internal memory chip, a white Kinect sensor, a glossy white wireless controller, physical copies of Kinect Adventures and Kinect Sports, and a three-month subscription to Xbox Live Gold.

=== Xbox 360 E special editions ===
==== 500 GB models ====
- In early September 2014, ten months after the launch of the Xbox One, Microsoft announced a special edition of the Xbox 360 E, called the "Xbox 360 Special Edition Blue Bundle". This model differentiated itself from the standard variants with its solid blue shell with turquoise accents on the console and the controller and its 500 GB hard drive, since the regular models either came with a 250 GB drive or offered 4 GB of onboard storage. This bundle came with digital download vouchers for Call of Duty: Ghosts and Call of Duty: Black Ops II, and a one-month Xbox Live Gold subscription. It was priced at US$249 and sold exclusively at Walmart and the Microsoft Store in the United States, from October 7, 2014 until the discontinua.

== Xbox 360 Launch Team Edition ==
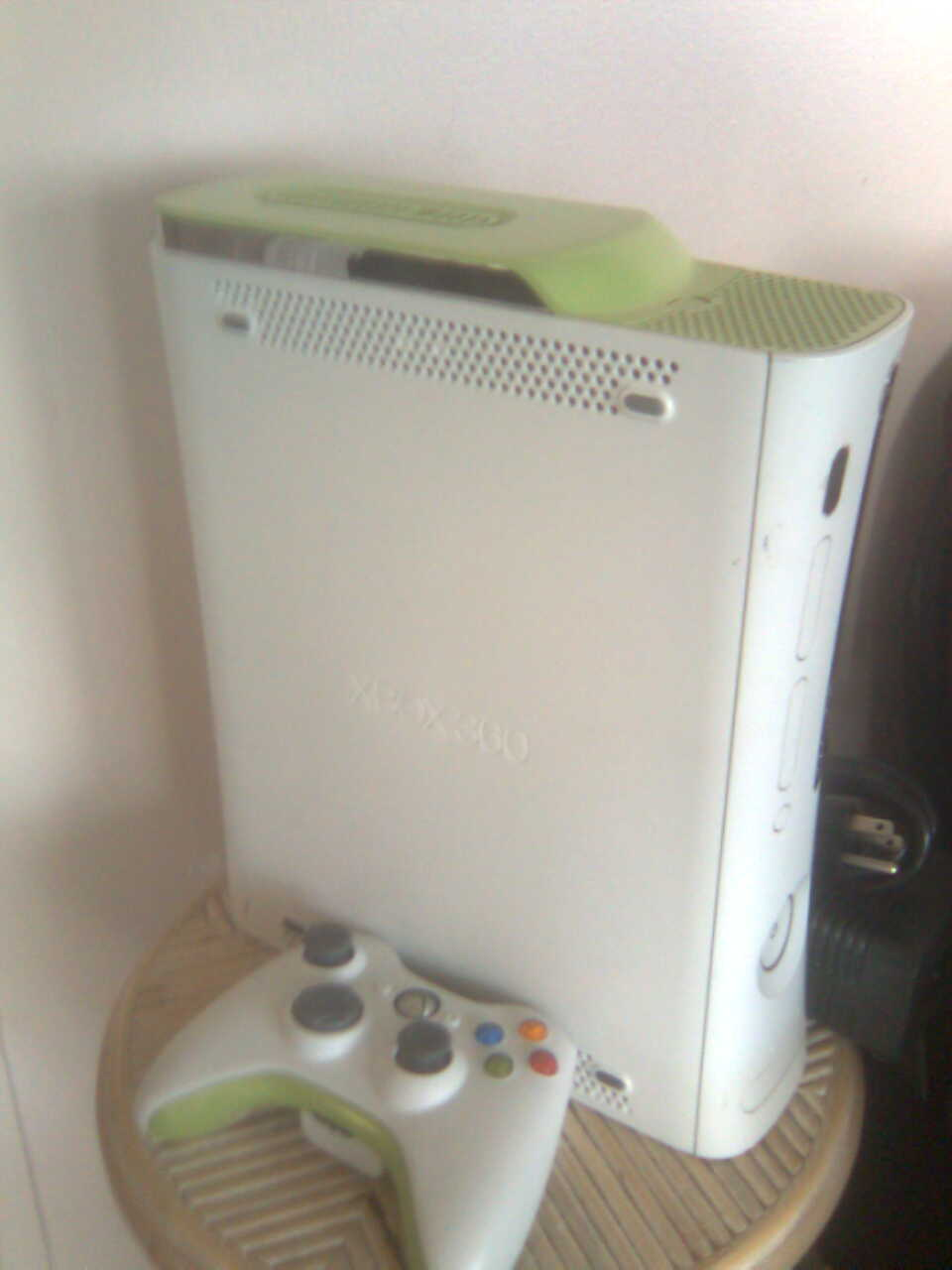
The Launch Team console with controller

A white console with green accents was released in 2005 only to the Xbox 360 Launch Team as a gift from Microsoft. The consoles came complete with a 20 GB HDD also in green to match the top and bottom sections that are typically grey in color. The HDD plate was also personalized and engraved with the team member's gamertag, with a few examples of non-gamertag engravings such as the console release date "November 22, 2005" or "3 Years of Pain". The consoles came with a limited issue controller to accompany the console. The grey trim on the controller is also replaced with molded green plastic to match the console. Each console came with a plain white faceplate. However, as an additional gift, each team member was given an additional packaged faceplate with one of a kind art with the caption "I Made This" on the USB door of the faceplate. Very few examples have been sold off from original team members' collections. Larry Hryb, better known as "Major Nelson", is known to own one which he displays pictures of on his website, being a member of the Launch Team.

== Holiday bundles ==
As with the original Xbox, Microsoft has continued bundling two video game titles in console retail packaging during the holiday season. During the holidays of 2007, the Xbox 360 Pro and Xbox 360 Elite consoles were bundled with Forza Motorsport 2 and Marvel: Ultimate Alliance. In the UK, Ireland and the Netherlands, Forza Motorsport 2 was bundled with Viva Piñata.

During the holidays of 2008, the Xbox 360 Pro and Xbox 360 Elite packages were bundled with Lego Indiana Jones: The Original Adventures and Kung Fu Panda, while the Xbox 360 Arcade consoles were bundled with Sega Superstars Tennis. During the holidays of 2009, the Xbox 360 Elite consoles were bundled with Lego Batman and Pure. During the holidays of 2010, the 250 GB Xbox 360 S consoles were bundled with a physical copy of Forza Motorsport 3 and a digital voucher to download Alan Wake from the Xbox Live Marketplace.

Two 250 GB Xbox 360 S bundles were available during the 2011 holiday season, both with a three-month Xbox Live Gold subscription included. The first, which retailed for US$399.99, contained a Kinect sensor, a physical copy of Kinect Adventures and a digital download voucher for Carnival Games: Monkey See Monkey Do. The second, which retailed for US$299.99 contained a physical copy of Fable III and a digital download voucher for Halo: Reach.

During the 2012 holiday season, Microsoft released several Xbox 360 S bundles at temporarily discounted prices, including a 4 GB console with a Kinect sensor and a physical copy of Kinect Adventures and Kinect Disneyland Adventures for US$249.99; and a 250 GB console with a physical copy of Forza Motorsport 4 (Essentials Edition) and a digital download voucher for The Elder Scrolls V: Skyrim for US$249.99.

For the 2013 holiday season, there were three bundles available, with each including an Xbox 360 S or an Xbox 360 E and a one-month Xbox Live Gold subscription. The 250 GB Kinect Holiday Value Bundle included a physical copy of Kinect Sports: Season Two and Kinect Adventures, and a digital download voucher for Forza Horizon. The 4 GB Kinect Holiday Value Bundle included a physical copy of the same two games found in the 250 GB Kinect Holiday Value Bundle. The 250 GB Holiday Value Bundle included a physical copy of Halo 4 and a digital download voucher for Tomb Raider.

During the 2014 holiday season, three Xbox 360 E bundles were sold, all with a one-month Xbox Live Gold subscription included. The 500 GB Holiday Value Bundle included a physical copy of Call of Duty: Ghosts and a digital download voucher for Call of Duty: Black Ops II. A similar bundle, with a blue console and controller and digital download vouchers for the same two games, was sold at Walmart. The 4 GB Kinect Holiday Value Bundle included a physical copy of Kinect Adventures, Kinect Sports, and Forza Horizon and was sold at Target.
