= Kinect Adventures! =

2010 video game

- North American cover art
- Developers: Good Science Studio; Smoking Gun Interactive
- Publisher: Microsoft Game Studios
- Director: Kudo Tsunoda
- Producers: Dana Hanna; Michael David Forgey
- Designers: Matt Coohill; Shawn Wright; Stephen Latta
- Composer: Daniel Pemberton
- Engine: Unreal Engine 3
- Platform: Xbox 360
- Release: NA: November 4, 2010; EU: November 10, 2010; AU: November 18, 2010; JP: November 20, 2010
- Genres: Adventure, sports
- Modes: Single-player, multiplayer

Kinect Adventures! is a 2010 sports video game developed by Good Science Studio and published by Microsoft Game Studios for the Xbox 360. It is a collection of five adventure and sports minigames that utilize the Kinect motion camera, and was offered as a pack-in game with the accessory. It was unveiled at E3 2010 and went on to become the best-selling game for the Xbox 360, as well as one of the top 50 best-selling games of all time, selling 24 million units worldwide. The game received mixed reviews.

== Gameplay ==
Kinect Adventures! uses full body motion to allow the player to engage in a variety of minigames, all of which feature jump-in, jump-out multiplayer play. Each minigame lasts about three minutes. While most of the minigames are co-operative in two player mode, Reflex Ridge is a competitive game. The game also supports Xbox Live multiplayer. At many points during the game, Kinect's RGB camera would take photos, which were shown to the player(s) and saved to a storage device. These could then be viewed within the game, with the option of uploading these to a private repository on the now defunct KinectShare.com and downloaded to a computer or uploaded to social networking sites.

The object of all the minigames is to get the highest number of adventure pins, which are collected in different ways. Adventure pins earn the player(s) medals which, in story mode, affect progression. Medals can be bronze, silver, gold and platinum, in order from least to most pins needed to acquire each.

As a pack-in game, Kinect Adventures! also contains features which aid users in proper set-up and use of the Kinect sensor.

=== Game types ===
- 20,000 Leaks

20,000 Leaks is set in a glass cube underwater. Players position their limbs and heads to plug cracks as crabs, fish, etc. crack the glass. There are also bosses (which cause more cracks than the crabs, fish etc.) such as sharks and swordfish. As difficulty increases, up to five leaks must be plugged at a time to earn Adventure pins. Each game consists of three waves, which end when time expires or when all leaks are plugged. Extra time left over at the end of each wave is added to the Adventure pin total. The name is a reference to the novel 20,000 Leagues Under the Sea by Jules Verne.

- River Rush

In River Rush, one or two players stand in a raft and work together to pick up the adventure pins scattered throughout the winding rapids. The raft is controlled by stepping left or right to steer, and by jumping to make the raft jump. There are many secret places that players can reach by taking ramps. There are considerably more adventure points there than on the river. Crashing into barrels, wood, markers, or rapid markers causes the player to not lose points, but keeps it just like in-game.

- Rally Ball

Rally Ball is a Breakout clone, but also similar to handball. Players use their limbs and heads to hit balls at blocks and targets which are at the end of a virtual hallway. When certain targets are hit, the ball splits into multiple balls which can be handled simultaneously. Each game consists of three rounds, each with a different set of blocks and targets. Rounds end when time expires or when all blocks and targets are destroyed. Extra time left over at the end of each round is added to the Adventure pin total.

- Reflex Ridge

Reflex Ridge is a track-and-field inspired game, but played on a moving platform in an environment similar to a wooden roller coaster or minecart. One or two players (in split screen) race on a platform, jump over hurdles, lean away from obstacles, and limbo to avoid hitting their heads on low beams. Jumping in place makes the platform move faster along its rail. Adventure pins are earned by avoiding obstacles or touching ones scattered throughout the course. They will not be earned if the players end up biffing, bonking, and bashing into the obstacles or touching ones scattered throughout it. The game is timed, with extra time left over at the end of the course added to the Adventure pin total.

- Space Pop

In Space Pop, transparent balls (soap bubbles) shuttle between holes on the walls, floors and ceilings of a virtual zero-gravity room. Players attempt to pop the bubbles by touching them to earn Adventure pins. Space Pop utilizes depth, requiring players to move toward and away from the sensor. To move upwards, players can flap their arms, and to stay at current height, players hold their arms out to their sides.

== Release ==
Pre-order Kinect bundles included a card with codes redeemable for two exclusive levels of Rallyball and one exclusive level of Reflex Ridge, as well as a helicopter prop for use with an Xbox Live Avatar.

== Reception ==
Reception

Aggregate score
Aggregator	Score
Metacritic	61/100

Review scores
Publication	Score
4Players	52%
Destructoid	6/10
Edge	6/10
Eurogamer	6/10
Famitsu	30/40
Game Informer	7.5/10
GameRevolution	C+
GameSpot	7/10
GameTrailers	6.6/10
GameZone	7/10
Giant Bomb	3/5
IGN	6.5/10
Official Xbox Magazine (US)	7/10
The Daily Telegraph	7/10
Metro	6/10

Kinect Adventures! received "mixed" reviews according to the review aggregation website Metacritic. Video game talk show Good Game's two presenters gave the game 6.5 and 6 out of 10, saying that it's a good demonstration of what the Kinect is capable of but lamented that there weren't more mini-games in the game, also stating that only 2 of the 5 mini-games were worth playing. In Japan, Famitsu gave it a score of three sevens and one nine for a total of 30 out of 40.

Being a pack-in game for Kinect, Kinect Adventures! has sold 24 million copies worldwide, making it the bestselling game for the Xbox 360.
