= Pay table =

Gaming machine payouts

A pay table is the name for the list of payouts on a slot machine or video poker machine. The table shows for each combination of symbols and the number of coins bet how many coins (or credits) the bettor will win. The pay table feature of the slot machine displays all possible winning sequences for that specific slot game.

On older machines and some newer reel machines, the pay table is listed on the face of the machine, usually above and below the area containing the wheels. Other video machines display the pay table when the player presses a "pay table" button or touches "pay table" on the screen. These tables list the number of credits the player will receive if the symbols listed on the pay table line up on the payline of the machine. The pay table details where the symbols must be for the bettor to be paid. In general, the symbols must be centered directly under the payline on the machine. Video slot machines generally will only display the payline for lines that are winners.

A payline is a line (straight or zig-zagged) that crosses one symbol on each reel of a slot machine, or the combination of symbols on the slot machine reels that the player is paid out for if he has made a bet on that combination. To be winning, any combination on the reels must have at least two identical symbols in a row, and the first one must occur on the first reel unless otherwise stated. In any other case, the combination doesn't pay out.

Paytable, which is normally found inside the main game panel, gives information about all future wins and payouts. Paylines, reward probabilities, winning combinations, and more can all be found here, as well as specifics about how to play the bonus rounds.

Some machines offer symbols that are 'wild' and will pay if they are visible in any position, even if they are not on the payline. These wild symbols may also count for any other symbol on the pay table.
