= Boom Boom Rocket =

2007 video game

- Developer: Bizarre Creations
- Publisher: Electronic Arts
- Platform: Xbox 360
- Release: April 11, 2007
- Genre: Music
- Modes: Single-player, multiplayer

Boom Boom Rocket (BBR) is a downloadable video game for Xbox 360's Xbox Live Arcade service. Boom Boom Rocket is the first rhythm game for Xbox Live Arcade and was developed by Geometry Wars creators Bizarre Creations and published by the Pogo division of Electronic Arts. The game was made backwards compatible on Xbox One on July 26, 2016.

== Gameplay ==
The objective of Boom Boom Rocket is to trigger fireworks explosions in time with music, in a gameplay style very similar to that of Dance Dance Revolution, Guitar Hero and Fantavision. Each rocket is color-mapped to one of the colored buttons on the Xbox 360 controller. A life gauge, which also serves as a score multiplier meter, fills with each successful shot and drains with each missed shot, and players are graded on overall hit accuracy. If the life meter drains completely, the player fails the song and the game is over. Each song has three unlockable firework types, one for each difficulty level. If the player successfully triggers a prescribed number of fireworks a rocket with a wavy tail appears. If this special rocket is triggered, the firework is unlocked and it will randomly replace other firework types on subsequent songs. If the rocket with the wavy tail is missed, or the song is not completed, the firework type remains locked.

An update that was released in November 2007 allows the game to recognize other controllers like guitars and dance pads. When using a guitar the rockets need to be "strummed" just as in Guitar Hero to be exploded in time.

Boom Boom Rocket includes several single-player modes and a local two-player mode. Single-player modes include the basic game, Endurance Mode (in which the song loops continuously and gradually speeds up, with the player attempting to complete as many "laps" as possible), and Practice Mode. Additionally, the game provides a Visualizer mode, which creates a fireworks display timed to the rhythm of audio files stored on the player's console.

The game provides twelve achievements (worth 200 Gamerscore points), which focus mainly on unlocking fireworks and attaining high grade levels and hit ratios. It also supports two-player mode on the same system, but does not support online multiplayer. As with most Xbox Live Arcade games, the title includes online leaderboards.

Boom Boom Rocket features ten music tracks (fifteen with the update), with three difficulty levels per track. Each track is a classical song that has been remixed into a modern style, such as ska, funk or techno. The game's music was composed by Ian Livingstone (Batman Returns and Project Gotham Racing 2 game soundtracks). While users cannot create their own custom soundtracks or utilize music from other sources (apart from the music visualizer mode), the game does support downloadable content including new tracks composed by Chris Chudley from Audioantics. (Geometry Wars, Project Gotham Racing 3) which should have been released on November 29, 2007; but were a day late. The new songs were free for a couple weeks after release.

== Track list ==
There are a total of ten music tracks in the game, with three difficulty levels per track. Each track is a classical song that has been remixed into one of a number of modern styles, including ska, funk and techno, and was composed by Ian Livingstone (Batman Returns and Project Gotham Racing 2 game soundtracks) and the DLC Rock Pack by Chris Chudley from Audioantics (Geometry Wars, Project Gotham Racing 3) . The songs are as follows:

- "Smooth Operetta" (from The Flower Duet)
- "Rave New World" (from Dvořák's Symphony No. 9)
- "William Tell Overload" (from William Tell Overture)
- "Hall of the Mountain Dude" (from In the Hall of the Mountain King)
- "1812 Overdrive" (from 1812 Overture)
- "Valkyries Rising" (from Ride of the Valkyries)
- "Tail Light Sonata" (from Beethoven's Moonlight Sonata)
- "Carmen Electric" (from Carmen)
- "Game Over Beethoven" (from Beethoven's Symphony No. 5)
- "Toccata and Funk" (from Toccata and Fugue in D minor, BWV 565)

DLC – Rock Pack composed by Audioantics, released November 30, 2007, is:

- "Sting of the Bumble Bee" (from Flight of the Bumblebee)
- "Explode to Joy" (from Ode to Joy)
- "Sugar High" (from Dance of the Sugar Plum Fairy)
- "Eine Kleine Rochtmusik" (from Eine kleine Nachtmusik)
- "Cannon in D" (from Pachelbel's Canon)

== Development and release ==
Boom Boom Rocket was developed by British studio Bizarre Creations and was initially conceived by Troy Whitlock at Pogo, a subsidiary of publisher EA focusing on casual games. Members of both companies recalled that EA expressed interest in Bizarre Creations due to the developer's successful Geometry Wars, leading to prototyping and eventual full-fledged production on a new rhythm-action title. However, Bizarre Creations founder Martyn Chudley claimed that it was his company that originally approached EA about a new project in order to avoid losing staff. A team was not in place when it was greenlit and slowly grew around the concept as development progressed. The crew consisted of seven core members, most of which were from the company's shared audio team. This included graphical coder Stephen Cakebread, the creator of Geometry Wars.

According to programmers Sam Hall and Nick Bygrave, Bizarre Creations "kind of made Boom Boom Rocket up as [they] went along", taking a relaxed approach to its creation. As the game was designed around casual play, its difficult settings were balanced to appeal to beginners and hardcore gamers alike. On-screen directional arrows were included alongside the four colors which correspond to the Xbox 360's gamepad face buttons to further the game's accessibility to players who are new to video games in general and even to players with color blindness. The "freeform" development of the game allowed EA to quickly approve amendments by the programmers such as the addition of the Endurance Mode and speeding the gameplay up with the increasing tempo of the music. Online multiplayer was a consideration, but was passed on due to time constraints. Designer Jeff Lewis stated that Boom Boom Rocket utilized the maximum graphical potential of the Xbox 360 and that, as with Geometry Wars, Xbox Live Arcade was an ideal platform for the coders to show off their talents in this regard. The team claimed they took no inspiration from Fantavision, a fireworks-themed puzzle game for the PlayStation 2, though Hall and Bygrave recognized visual similarities between the two.

For the musical score, Bizarre Creations chose the work of composer Ian Livingstone, who had worked with them on Project Gotham Racing 2 and Treasure Planet, and even used the first track he ever submitted for Boom Boom Rocket for its first level. Classical music was selected due to its assumed neutral appeal and because players might recognize its beats and choruses over contemporary songs. Lewis said that these classical pieces were remixed to have structures like modern pop, rock, and dance songs, with alternating choruses and verses, similar to how a player deals with waves of enemies in a shooter game. Although the developer contemplated including the ability to generate levels to custom soundtracks, the programmers felt this would have too difficult to do correctly and that the end result would be a poor substitute for the already-varied stock levels.

After ten to twelve months of development, Boom Boom Rocket was officially announced in January 2007. The game was launched in North America and Europe for Xbox Live Arcade on April 11, 2007. EA wished to leverage its credibility with core gamers by publishing the game under its own brand rather than its subsidiary Pogo. In October 2007, Boom Boom Rocket came bundled alongside four other Xbox Live Arcade games in the Arcade model of the Xbox 360 in both regions. DLC titled "Rock Pack" was released on November 29, 2007 and included five new songs and an additional fifteen unlockable fireworks. These songs had been remixed by Geometry Wars composer Chris Chudley. Also included were an update to the game which added guitar peripheral and dance pad support; Japanese and Korean language options; and various updates to the leaderboard and scoring systems. The DLC was available on the marketplace for free until December 16, after which it cost 250 Microsoft Points. Boom Boom Rocket was released on the Japanese Xbox Live Arcade on November 30, 2007 and was bundled with the region's Arcade model Xbox 360 console on March 6, 2008. The game was added to the list of backwards compatibile games for Xbox One on July 26, 2016.

== Reception ==
Reception

Aggregate scores
Aggregator	Score
GameRankings	69%
Metacritic	69/100

Review scores
Publication	Score
Edge	5/10
Eurogamer	7/10
GameSpot	6.6/10
GamesTM	3/5
IGN	7/10 (US); 4.7/10 (UK)
Official Xbox Magazine (UK)	7/10
Official Xbox Magazine (US)	8.5/10
Superjuegos	80%
TeamXbox	8/10

Boom Boom Rocket holds aggregate scores of 69% on both GameRankings and Metacritic, corresponding to "mixed or average reviews" on the latter website.
