= Video poker =

Casino video game

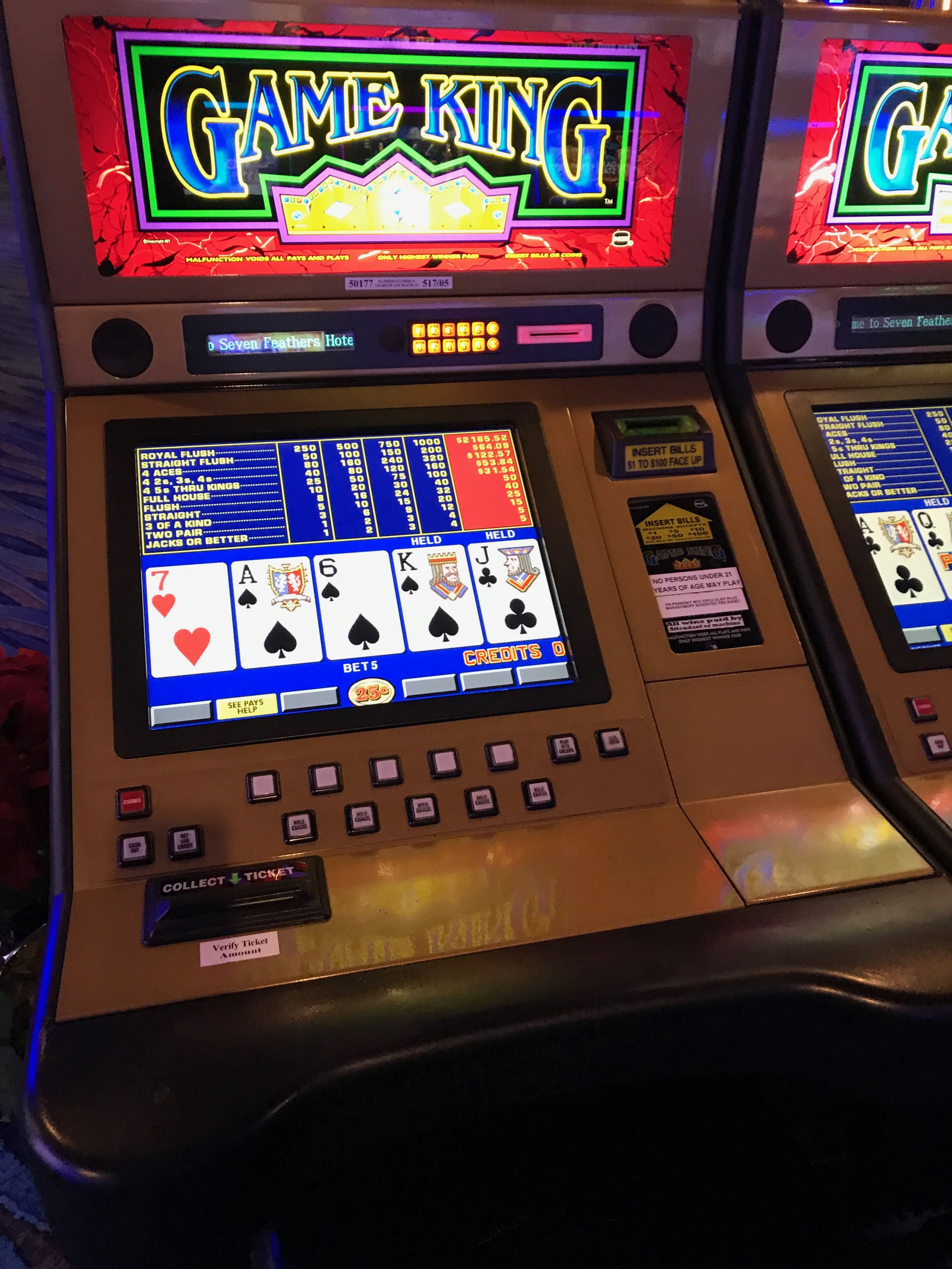
A video poker machine at Seven Feathers Casino

Video poker is a casino game based on five-card draw poker. It is played on a computerized console similar in size to a slot machine.

== History ==
Video poker first became commercially viable when it became economical to combine a television-like monitor with a solid state central processing unit. The earliest models appeared at the same time as the first personal computers were produced, in the mid-1970s, although they were primitive by today's standards.

Video poker became more firmly established when SIRCOMA, which stood for Si Redd's Coin Machines (and which evolved over time to become International Game Technology), introduced Draw Poker in 1979. Throughout the 1980s video poker became increasingly popular in casinos, as people found the devices less intimidating than playing table games. Today, video poker enjoys a prominent place on the gaming floors of many casinos. The game is especially popular with Las Vegas locals, who tend to patronize locals casinos off the Las Vegas Strip. These local casinos often offer lower-denomination machines or better odds.

A few people who are skilled in calculating odds have become professional video poker players.

== The game ==
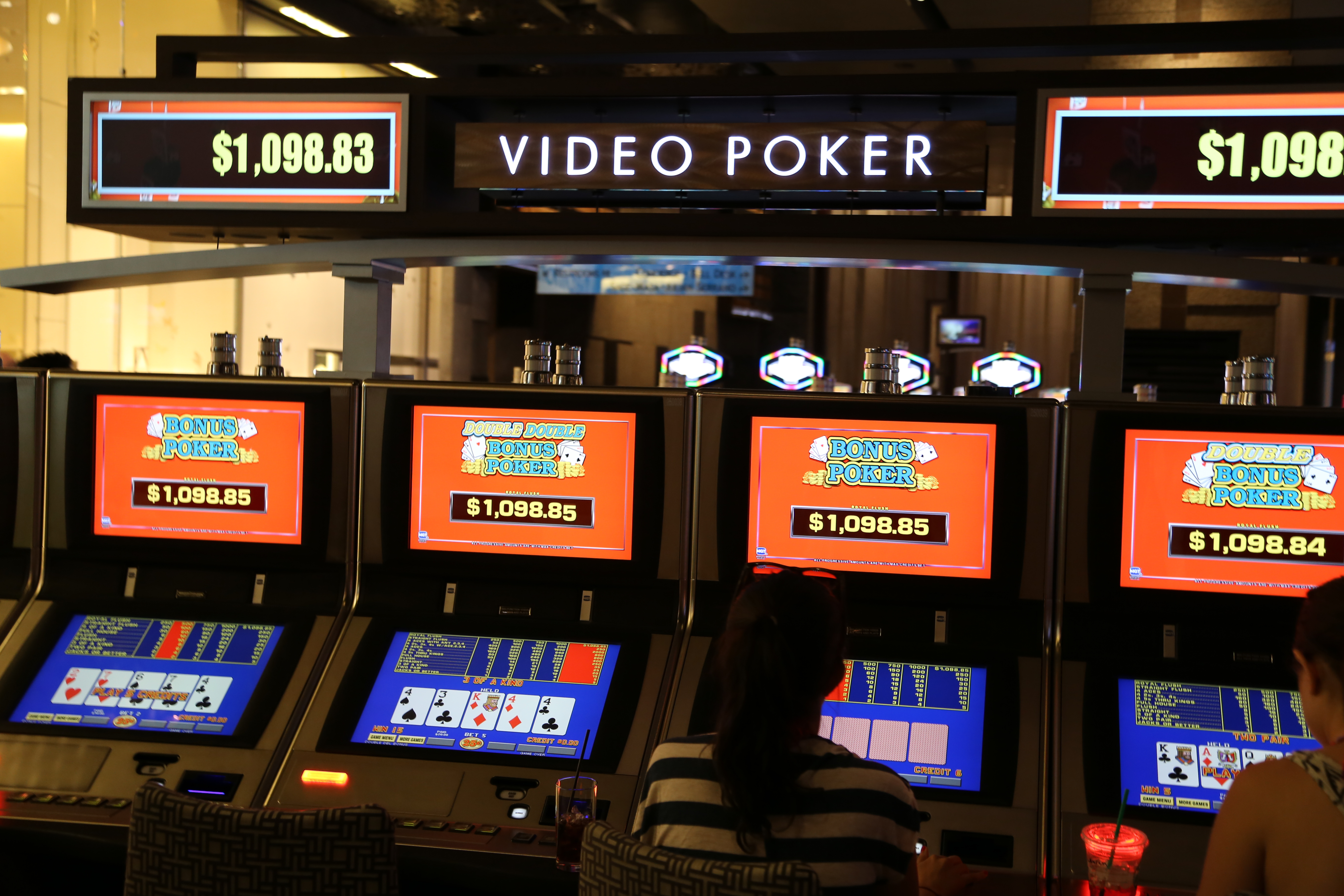
Video poker machines at Harrah's New Orleans

After inserting money (or a bar-coded paper ticket with credit) into the machine, play begins by placing a bet of one or more credits and pressing the "deal" button. The player is then given 5 cards (like five-card draw) and has the opportunity to discard one or more of them in exchange for new ones drawn from the same virtual deck. After the draw, the machine pays out if the hand or hands played match one of the winning combinations, which are posted in the pay table. Unlike the table version, the player may discard all 5 of their original cards if they so choose.

Pay tables allocate the payouts for hands and are based on how rare they are, the game variation, and the decision of the game operator. A typical pay table starts with a minimum hand of a pair of jacks, which pays even money. All the other hand combinations in video poker are the same as in table poker, including such hands as two pair, three of a kind, straight (a sequence of 5 cards of consecutive value), flush (any 5 cards of the same suit), full house (a pair and a three of a kind), four of a kind (four cards of the same value), straight flush (5 consecutive cards of the same suit) and royal flush (a Ten, a Jack, a Queen, a King and an Ace of the same suit).

Some machines offer progressive jackpots or other unique bonuses, spurring players to both play more coins and to play more frequently.

== Regulation ==
Video poker machines in casinos in the United States are regulated by state or Indian gaming agencies. These agencies typically require that the machines deal random card sequences using a virtual deck of cards. This is based on a Nevada Gaming Commission regulation later adopted by other states with a gaming authority. Video poker machines are tested to ensure compliance with this requirement before being offered to the public.

== Variations ==
Video poker variations include Deuces Wild, where a two serves as a wild card; Joker's Wild, where a joker serves as a wild card; Anything's Wild, where the player selects any card (by rank) to act as the wild card before the hand is dealt; pay schedule modification, where four aces with a four or smaller kicker pays an enhanced amount (these games usually have some adjective in the title such as "bonus", "double", or "triple"); and multi-play poker, where the player starts with a base hand, and each additional played hand draws from a different set of cards with the base hand. (Multi-play games are offered in "Triple Play", "Five Play", "Ten Play", "Fifty Play" and "One Hundred Play" versions.)

Additionally, side bets have been added to the game where for a fee, the player may receive some sort of benefit. Popular examples include Super Times Pay, Double Super Times Pay, Hot Roll, Dice Fever, and Atomic Fever, where the player has a chance of receiving a factor which multiplies all winnings in a hand, Ultimate X, where for double the bet the player gets a factor based on the strength of the final hand which is applied to the next hand, and Super Draw 6, where for double the bet the player will receive a sixth card which can be used to have five card hands easier to make and make special six card hands with its own pay table.

A version common in the early days of video poker, but rarely found today, is "Pick a Pair" where the player is presented two up cards and chooses between two pairs of three cards, one of which is face up and the other face down.

In games without a wild card, a player on average will receive four-of-a-kind hand approximately once every 500 hands, while a player may play tens of thousands of hands before a royal flush, which usually has the highest payout.

== Full pay games ==
When modern video poker games first appeared, the highest-paying common variant of a particular game was called "full-pay". Game variants returning a lower payback percentage were termed "short-pay". Though the term full-pay is still in use, many game variants return more. Payback percentage expresses the long-term expected value of the player's wager as a percentage if the game is played perfectly. A payback percentage of 99%, for example, indicates that for each $100 wagered, in the long run, the player would expect to lose $1 if they played every hand in the optimal way. Full-pay Jacks or Better, for example, offers a payback percentage of 99.54%. Some payback percentages on full-pay games are often close to or over 100%.

Casinos do not usually advertise payback percentages, leaving it up to the player to identify which video poker machines offer the best schedules.

The payoff schedules for most video poker machines are configured with a pay schedule that pays proportionally more for certain hands (such as a royal flush) when the maximum number of credits (typically 5 coins) is bet. Therefore, players who do not play with the maximum number of credits at a time are playing with a lower theoretical return.

=== Jacks or Better ===
"Jacks or Better," sometimes called "Draw Poker," is the most common variation of video poker. Payoffs begin at a pair of jacks. Full pay Jacks or Better is also known as 9/6 Jacks or Better since the payoff for a full house is 9 times the bet, and the payoff for a flush is 6 times the bet. Sometimes, 10/6 and 9/7 versions of Jacks or Better can be found as promotions.

Hand	Prize	Combinations	Probability	Return
Royal Flush	800	41,126,022	0.000025	1.9807%
Straight Flush	50	181,573,608	0.000109	0.5465%
Four of a kind	25	3,924,430,647	0.002363	5.9064%
Full House	9	19,122,956,883	0.011512	10.3610%
Flush	6	18,296,232,180	0.011015	6.6087%
Straight	4	18,653,130,482	0.011229	4.4918%
Three of a kind	3	123,666,922,527	0.074449	22.3346%
Two Pair	2	214,745,513,679	0.129279	25.8558%
Jacks or Better	1	356,447,740,914	0.214585	21.4585%
All Other	0	906,022,916,158	0.545435	0.0000%
Totals	–	1,661,102,543,100	1.000000	99.5439%

=== Bally's All American ===
Bally Technologies All American video poker is based on Jacks or Better with an increased payout for flushes, straights and straight flushes, but reduced payout for full houses and two pairs (8–8–8–3–1 versus 9–6–4–3–2). The full pay version (quads return 50 bets), once common but now rare, is one of the highest return versions of video poker offered, but the play strategy is very complex and mastered by few. IGT's version of the game is called USA Poker.

=== Tens or Better ===
"Tens or Better" is a variation of 6/5 Jacks or Better. The minimum paying hand is a pair of tens, rather than a pair of Jacks. Strategy is similar between the two games, in spite of the very different full house and flush payouts.

=== Joker's Wild ===
"Joker's Wild", as the name implies, adds a joker to the mix. The joker is fully wild and substitutes to make stronger hands. The inclusion of the wild joker also adds another winning hand in 5-of-a-kind. The game's name inspired a game show of the same name. The full pay version of Joker Two Pair or better (6–7–8), once common but now rare, is one of the highest return versions of video poker offered, but the play strategy is very complex and mastered by few.

=== Deuces Wild ===
"Deuces Wild" is a variation of video poker in which all twos are wild. (Wild cards substitute for any other card in the deck in order to make a better poker hand). In Deuces Wild, the payout for a four of a kind makes up approximately ⅓ of the payback percentage of the game, and a four of a kind occurs on average approximately every fifteen hands. Deuces Wild can be found with pay schedules that offer a theoretical return as high as 100.8%, when played with perfect strategy. This full-pay version was found only in Nevada, with the last operating machine at Sam's Town Las Vegas until March 2023. It is also available with other pay schedules that have lesser theoretical returns:

Hand	1 credit	2 credits	3 credits	4 credits	5 credits
Natural Royal Flush	300	600	900	1200	4000
Four Deuces	200	400	600	800	1000
Wild Royal Flush	25	50	75	100	125
Five of a Kind	15	30	45	60	75
Straight Flush	9	18	27	36	45
Four of a Kind	5	10	15	20	25
Full House	3	6	9	12	15
Flush	2	4	6	8	10
Straight	2	4	6	8	10
Three of a Kind	1	2	3	4	5
Theoretical Return	99.7%	99.7%	99.7%	99.7%	100.8%

Variations are available that pay different amounts for the quad "deuces", such as Double Deuces (2000), Loose Deuces (2500), Triple Deuces (3000), and Royal Deuces (4000). Full pay Loose Deuces (25–17–10), once common but now rare, is one of the highest return versions of video poker offered.

=== Sigma Flush Attack ===
Sigma Flush Attack is a combination of video poker and a banking slot, in this case what is being banked is flushes. After 3,4, or 5 flushes (varies by machine), the machine switches into "flush attack mode" in which the next flush pays 100 or 125 credits instead of the more usual 30 credits of 9–6 Jacks or Better. Some of these machines are linked, which means players can simply wait for someone else to put the bank in flush attack mode, or alternately with non-linked machines a player can play after observing a previous player hit flushes but not enough to trigger the flush attack, a practice called "vulturing". The higher payoff of the flush attack represents one of the higher overlays of video poker. These machines, once common, are now relatively rare.

=== Bonus Poker ===
"Bonus Poker" is a video poker game based on Jacks or Better, but Bonus Poker offers a higher payout percentage for four of a kind. The full-pay version of this game returns 99.2%. The game has multiple versions featuring different bonus payouts based on the ranking of the four of a kind.

== Low pay video poker games ==
Often casinos choose to use pay tables which reduce the maximum payout percentage as compared to other commonly available game variants. This increases the house edge, but generally reduces net revenue for the casino as players experience less "play time" on the machine, busting out of their buy-in at an earlier point. Casinos that reduce paytables generally have to increase promotions to compensate and attract customers.

=== 9/5 Jacks or Better ===
9/5 Jacks or Better is a low pay version of the game. The payout for making a Flush is cut from 6x your bet to 5x your bet, but all other payouts remain the same. This reduces the maximum payout percentage to 98.45% for players betting five coins per hand to receive the Royal Flush bonus.

=== 8/6 Jacks or Better ===
8/6 Jacks or Better is another often used pay table for Jacks or Better games. The payout for making a Full House is cut from 9x your bet to 8x your bet, while all other payouts remain the same as in a full pay game. This reduces the maximum payout percentage to 98.39% for players betting five coins per hand to receive the Royal Flush bonus.

=== 8/5 Jacks or Better ===
8/5 Jacks or Better cuts the Full House payout from 9x your bet to 8x your bet, and also cuts the Flush payout from 6x your bet to 5x your bet. All other payouts remain the same as in a full pay game. This reduces the maximum payout percentage to 97.30% for players betting five coins per hand to receive the Royal Flush bonus. A common promotion used by casinos to encourage play on this tight paytable was to add a 2% progressive meter to the royal flush.

=== 7/5 Jacks or Better ===
7/5 Jacks or Better cuts the Full House payout from 9x your bet to 7x your bet, and also cuts the Flush payout from 6x your bet to 5x your bet. All other payouts remain the same as in a full pay game. This reduces the maximum payout percentage to 96.15% for players betting five coins per hand to receive the Royal Flush bonus.

=== 6/5 Jacks or Better ===
6/5 Jacks or Better cuts the Full House payout from 9x your bet to 6x your bet, and also cuts the Flush payout from 6x your bet to 5x your bet. All other payouts remain the same as in a full pay game. This reduces the maximum payout percentage to 95.00% for players betting five coins per hand to receive the Royal Flush bonus.

=== Progressive jackpot games ===
Other kinds of video poker only have positive theoretical returns when the progressive jackpot is high enough. Many establishments advertise with a billboard when the progressive jackpot is high enough. Otherwise sub-optimal games like 8/5 jacks or better can become positive expectation when the jackpot is large enough.

== Terminology ==
As with regular poker, there are many different terms and phrases that are associated with playing video poker, including the following:

Video Poker Term	Explanation
Full Pay	The highest paying variant of a video poker game. Typically with high return-to-player game percentages.
Low Pay	Refers to video poker games which increase the house edge and reduce the return-to-player percentage.
Natural Royal Flush	A unique case when the highest possible hand, a Royal Flush, is dealt to the player.
Power Poker	Theoretically the most profitable poker strategy.
Multi-Play	A feature that allows participants to play with more than one hand.
Hold	When a player chooses to keep the cards in their hand.
Auto Hold	A feature available in certain video poker games. If turned on, the game automatically chooses which cards to hold.
Not So Ugly Ducks (NSUD)	A game most well known for paying 16 for a 5 of a kind and 10 for a straight flush.
Game Denomination	Refers to the value of the cards or the coin size in a video poker game.
Flush	A five-card hand that contains cards of the same suit.
Discard	The cards you decide to throw away after the initial deal.
Draw	The second deal of the cards, after you have decided which cards to hold and which to discard.
Hand	The five cards (or less) dealt on the screen are known as a hand.

== See also ==
- Casino comps
- Draw poker
- Gambling
- Gambling mathematics
- Problem gambling
- Video blackjack
- Video Lottery Terminal
- Balatro
