= Xbox Live Arcade =

Digital video game download service

- Developer: Microsoft
- Launched: November 6, 2004 (Xbox); November 22, 2005 (Xbox 360)
- Discontinued: October 31, 2010 (Xbox); July 29, 2024 (Xbox 360)
- Platforms: Xbox, Xbox 360
- Website: marketplace.xbox.com/Games/XboxArcadeGames

Xbox Live Arcade (or XBLA) was a video game digital distribution service that was available for the Xbox and Xbox 360 consoles. It focused on smaller downloadable games from both major publishers and independent game developers. Titles on the service ranged from previously released arcade and console games to brand new games designed for the service, and were priced from a range of 5 to 20 US dollars. While originally requiring a disc to gain access to the service on the original Xbox, the Arcade was integrated into the Xbox 360 along with the rest of the Xbox Live Marketplace (later renamed Xbox Games Store) with the launch of the new console.

As of October 2016, there had been 709 Xbox Live Arcade titles released for the Xbox 360, with 27 being released for the original Xbox. The release of the Xbox One did not carry the Arcade branding over, and following the closure of the Xbox Live services for the original Xbox in 2010 and the Xbox Games Store for the Xbox 360 in 2024, the Xbox Live Arcade branding is effectively defunct.

== History ==
=== Xbox ===
Xbox Live Arcade on Xbox (2004)

The Xbox Live Arcade service was officially announced on May 12, 2004, at Microsoft's E3 press conference and launched on November 6, 2004, for the original Xbox game console. The XBLA software was obtained by ordering it on Microsoft's website. It was sent by mail on a disc that also contained a free version of the Ms. Pac-Man video game.

To generate greater publicity for the service, the disc was also distributed with special issues of the Official Xbox Magazine and as part of the Forza Motorsport Xbox console bundle The service launched with six titles and expanded its library to twelve titles by the end of the year. Once connected to Xbox Live, customers could purchase additional titles by using a credit card, or download a limited trial version of a game. Prices for the games range from $4.99 to $14.99. While Xbox Live for the original Xbox was shut down in 2010, Xbox Live Arcade is now playable online using replacement online servers for the Xbox called Insignia, though the games themselves are not available for download.

List of Xbox Live Arcade games released on the original Xbox (28 titles)
Alien Sky; AstroPop; Atomaders; Bankshot Billiards; Bejeweled; Bookworm; Dangerous Mines; Dino and Aliens; Feeding Frenzy; Fuzzee Fever	Gauntlet; Guardian; Hamsterball; Hardwood Solitaire; Joust; Marble Blast Gold; Ms. Pac-Man; Mutant Storm	Namco Vintage (Pole Position, Dig Dug, & Galaga); New Ralley-X; Orbz; Pipeline; Ricochet Lost Worlds; Robotron: 2084; Smash TV; Super Collapse II; ThinkTanks; Zuma

=== Xbox 360 ===
Xbox Live Arcade on Xbox 360

On November 22, 2005, XBLA was relaunched on the Xbox 360. The service was integrated into the main Dashboard user interface, and the Xbox 360 hard drives were bundled with a free copy of Hexic HD. Every Arcade title on the Xbox 360 supports leaderboards, has 200 Achievement points, and high-definition 720p graphics. They also have a trial version available for free download. These demos are playable and most of them offer only a fraction of the levels, modes, and content of the full game. A full version of the game must be purchased to allow the user to upload scores to the leaderboards, unlock achievements, play online multiplayer (with a few exceptions), and download bonus content. Several new features and enhancements have been added through software updates including a friends leaderboard, additional sorting options, faster enumeration of games, an auto-download feature for newly released trial games, and "Tell a Friend" messages. The original size limit imposed by Microsoft for Xbox Live Arcade games was 50 MB, in order to ensure any downloaded game could fit on a 64 MB Xbox memory unit. The limit has since been changed to 150 MB, then 350 MB, and now 2 GB, the latter of which is a technical limitation of the system (rather than an arbitrary limit imposed by Microsoft). On September 12, 2012, the 2 GB limit was raised to an unknown number with two titles, Red Johnson's Chronicles and Double Dragon Neon weighing at 2.68 GB and 2.24 GB, respectively.

On July 12, 2006, Microsoft launched the "Xbox Live Arcade Wednesdays" program, which promised a new Arcade game to be launched every Wednesday for the rest of that Summer. When that summer ended, Microsoft announced that new titles for XBLA would also be released on Wednesdays. In order to promote the service in retail, Microsoft released Xbox Live Arcade Unplugged Volume 1 as a compilation disc of six games. On October 18, 2007, Microsoft announced the Xbox 360 Arcade console SKU which includes an Xbox Live Arcade Compilation Disc bundled with the console. That disc included full versions of Boom Boom Rocket, Feeding Frenzy, Luxor 2, Pac-Man Championship Edition, and Uno, as well as seven additional trials/demos. (This disc was also sold separately, but most of the existing copies were bundled with the console.) On May 22, 2008, Microsoft's general manager of Xbox Live, Marc Whitten, detailed changes for the service that included increasing the size limit of the games to 350MB and "improving" the way digital rights management is handled. Furthermore, Microsoft created an internal games studio to create "high quality digital content" for XBLA.

On July 30, 2008, Microsoft announced the XBLA Summer of Arcade. Anyone who downloaded one of the titles released over August, (Geometry Wars: Retro Evolved 2, Braid, Bionic Commando Rearmed, Galaga Legions, and Castle Crashers) would be entered into a prize draw with a grand prize of 100,000 Microsoft Points, 12 Month Xbox Live Gold subscription, and an Xbox 360 Elite console. Another Summer of Arcade began the next year on July 22, 2009. Anyone who purchases all the titles released ('Splosion Man, Marvel vs. Capcom 2, TMNT: Turtles in Time Re-Shelled, Trials HD and Shadow Complex) would receive an 800-point reward. The next Summer of Arcade began on July 21, 2010, and featured Limbo, Hydro Thunder Hurricane, Castlevania: Harmony of Despair, Monday Night Combat and Lara Croft and the Guardian of Light. A "Shopping Spree" promotion ended November 1, 2010, in which anyone who spent over 2400 points during October 2010 received an 800-point reward.

By March 10, 2006, three million downloads had been made on the service. By January 30, 2007, that number had grown to 20 million. The service reached 25 million downloads on March 6, 2007 with 45 million downloads projected by the end of 2007. On March 27, 2007, Microsoft declared Uno to be the first Xbox Live Arcade game to exceed one million downloads. Nearly 70 percent of Xbox 360 owners connected to Xbox Live have downloaded an Arcade title with the attach rate being 6–7 titles per user. Original games typically receive 350,000 downloads in the first month. Titles have an average 156% financial return over twelve months with the first two months of sales accounting for just 35% of total volume. Average conversion rate (from trial download to purchase) across all titles is 18% (a low of 4% and high of 51%). On September 19, 2007, Microsoft announced the top ten Arcade downloads worldwide as Aegis Wing, Uno, Texas Hold 'em, Geometry Wars: Retro Evolved, Bankshot Billiards 2, Street Fighter II: Hyper Fighting, Teenage Mutant Ninja Turtles 1989 Classic Arcade, Worms, Castlevania: Symphony of the Night, and Contra.

=== Xbox One ===
With Xbox One, Microsoft has decided to forgo placing different types of games in different channels. As such, Microsoft has discontinued use of the Arcade moniker, instead grouping all types of games (would-be Arcade titles, retail, and indies) together.

== Pricing and releases ==
Xbox Live Arcade titles ranged in price from $2.50 to $20 with the vast majority selling for $10 and under. The games are generally aimed towards more casual gamers, striving for "pick up and play" appeal. Several games were temporarily free, including Texas Hold 'em, Carcassonne, and Undertow. Others were permanently free including Aegis Wing, a game created by three Microsoft interns, TotemBall, a game that can only be played with the Xbox Live Vision camera, Yaris (a Toyota-backed advergame), and Dash of Destruction, which was released on December 17, 2008, as a Doritos advergame. On November 30, 2007, Microsoft introduced "Xbox Live Arcade Hits", where games were permanently reduced in price (a similar concept to their "Platinum Hits" for regular retail Xbox 360 games). As of July 22, 2008, current Arcade Hits included Lumines Live!, Assault Heroes, Zuma, Doom, Bankshot Billiards 2, Small Arms, Puzzle Quest: Challenge of the Warlords, and Marble Blast Ultra. On June 24, 2011, video game website 1UP.com reported that Microsoft was preparing to bring free-to-play games to Xbox Live and said games would include a microtransaction service. The first free-to-play game, Happy Wars, was released on October 12, 2012.

== Removal of games ==
In May 2007, Microsoft announced that games older than six months would become eligible for delisting from the service if they had a Metacritic score below 65 and a conversion rate below 6%. The objective was to "focus the catalogue more on larger, more immersive games and make it much easier to find the games you are looking for." However, Microsoft has never removed a game using this method.

In February 2010, it was announced that nine games from Midway Games would no longer be available for purchase, "due to publisher evolving rights and permissions" (even though Sony's PlayStation Store never did as such with its own downloadable Midway games), referring to the purchase by Warner Bros. of some assets of Midway Games, including certain rights related to the nine games. Id Software's Doom was pulled from the catalogue due to Id being purchased by publisher ZeniMax Media, and as such the publishing rights were removed from then publisher Activision. From January 19, 2012, Doom was restored to Xbox Live Arcade under new publisher Bethesda. In 2011, Ubisoft announced that Teenage Mutant Ninja Turtles: Turtles in Time Re-Shelled was due to be removed from the Xbox Live service on June 30, 2011, due to an expired license. Chessmaster Live was also removed.

On December 15, 2013, Capcom announced on their blog that Marvel vs. Capcom 2 and Ultimate Marvel vs. Capcom 3 would be removed from the XBLA store. Although no specific date was listed, the last date for DLC for these titles was listed as December 26, 2013.

== See also ==
- Xbox Games Store
- Xbox Live Indie Games
- PlayStation Network
- Virtual Console
- WiiWare
- Nintendo eShop
- Nintendo Network
- Nintendo Switch Online
