= Casino hold 'em =

Casino gambling game

Casino Hold'em is a casino gambling game. This banking game, introduced by Stephen Au-Yeung in 2000 (First Texas Hold'em Poker play against the casino and not other players) and now played in live casinos worldwide. It was licensed for use in the United Kingdom in 2007. In addition online casinos offer the game, which is based on the traditional multi-player Texas Hold'em Poker.

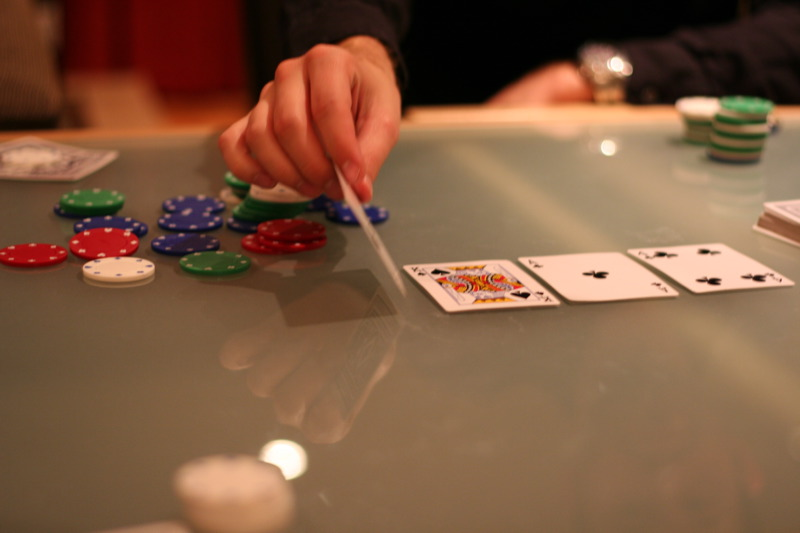
Dealing the turn in Texas hold 'em

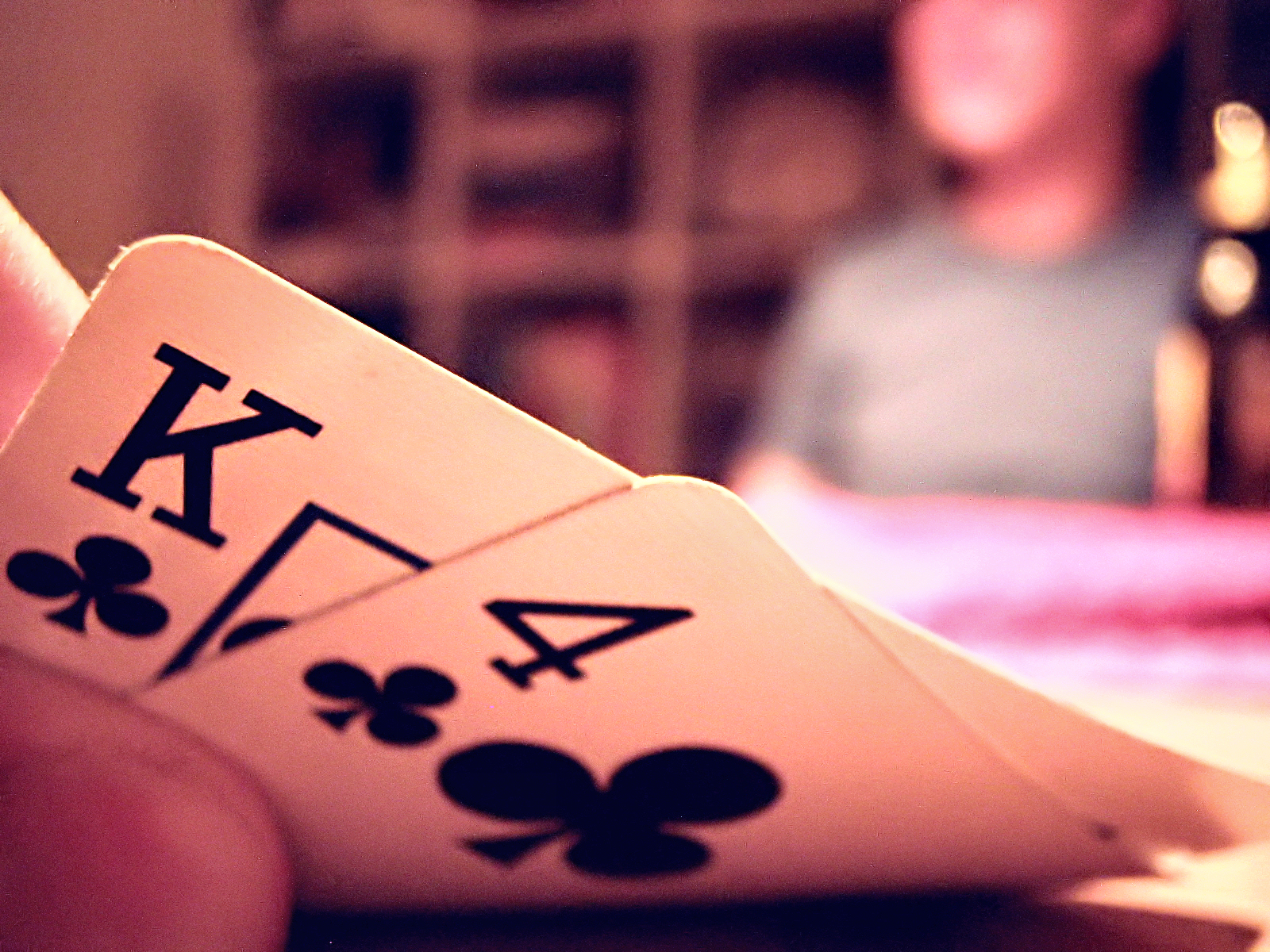
Picture of hole cards in a game of Texas hold 'em

Casino Hold'em is a house game designed to be dealt by a croupier for casino patrons to play in the main casino. Players play the house and not other players in this variant. Subject to the dealer qualifying, it is a straight contest between the dealer's hand and the player's, player may also get paid an AnteWin Bonus on theirs Ante bet. Player can also place an AA Bonus side bet which is based on the poker value of theirs two personal cards and the first three flop cards.

== History ==
Stephen Au-Yeung devised the game in the late 1990s as a tool to assist in training his partner of the time to play Texas Hold 'Em poker. After this the training tool was developed into a House game and launched in 2000. It first appeared as a live casino game in Egypt, Russia and South Africa. It was shown in 2001 at the World Gaming Congress Expo, Las-Vegas, US and in 2002 at the International Casino Exhibition held at Earls Court Exhibition Centre, London, UK.

== Rules ==
- The game is played with a standard 52 card deck.
- Each player makes an Ante bet and may make an optional AA bonus side bet.
- The player and dealer are both dealt two cards (face down).
- Three cards are then dealt to the board and will eventually contain five cards.
- After checking his/her cards, the player has to decide (a) to fold with no further play losing the Ante bet or (b) to make a Call bet of double the Ante bet.
- If one or more players makes a Call bet the dealer will deal two more cards to the board, for a total of five.
- Players and dealer make their best five card poker hand from their own two personal cards and five board cards.
- Each player’s hand are compared with the dealer’s.
- The dealer must have a pair of 4s or better to qualify.
- If the dealer does not qualify, the Ante bet pays according to the AnteWin pay table and the Call bet is a push (stand off).
- If the dealer qualifies, and the player's hand is better than the dealer's, the Ante bet pays according to the Ante-Win pay table and the Call bet pays 1 to 1.
- If the dealer qualifies, and the dealer's hand is equal to the player's, all bets are push (it doesn't win or lose).
- If the dealer qualifies, and the dealer's hand is better than the player's, the player loses all bets.

== Strategy ==
There is no easy way to quantify optimal strategy for this game since the optimal decision for each hand is based on the combination of all 7 cards (two personal cards and five board cards) dealt. As such while computer programs can easily deal with the calculations required to make the correct play in any particular hand, it is difficult to make a set of general rules which can be memorized such as exists for Blackjack. The optimal strategy player will raise 82% of the time. So only in the worst 18% of hands should the player fold. These are broadly when the player has two singletons in the hole that are low compared to the flop, with little or no chance for a straight or flush.

== AnteWin pay table ==
In Casino Hold'em the player not only wins a standard 1 to 1 sum if they have the stronger hand, but for rare hands a higher sum. This pay table typically pays a royal flush 100 to 1, straight flush 20 to 1, four of a kind 10 to 1, full house 3 to 1, flush 2 to 1, and straight or less the standard 1 to 1.

== House edge ==
The house edge of Casino Hold'em excluding the side bet (that is, the percentage of each bet the casino will on average win, assuming perfect play on the part of the player) varies depending on the specific rules in the casino but is the most common pay tables result in a house edge varying from just below 2% to around 2.5%. Using the ante pay table above, the house edge is 2.16%.

== Side bets ==
A side bet known as the AA Bonus is based on the poker value of the player's two cards and the first three flop cards.

A pair of aces to a straight pays 7 to 1, flush 20 to 1, full house 30 to 1, four of a kind 40 to 1, straight flush 50 to 1 and royal flush 100 to 1. A variations to this pay table, A pair of aces to a straight pays 7 to 1, flush or higher 25 to 1.
