= Texas Hold 'em (video game) =

2006 video game

- Developer: TikGames
- Publisher: Microsoft Game Studios
- Platform: Xbox 360 (XBLA)
- Release: August 23, 2006
- Genre: Card game
- Modes: Single-player, multiplayer

Texas Hold 'em is an Xbox Live Arcade version of the popular poker variant of the same name developed by TikGames. It was released on August 23, 2006 and was the first XBLA game to be offered as a free download, for 48 hours following its release. It was also made available on the Xbox Live Arcade Unplugged Vol. 1 disc, which is available for retail purchase as well as bundled with Xbox 360 Premium consoles and Zune 3.0 firmware.

The game features three single player modes, including standard play, tournament play, and scenarios. It also supports up to eight players on Xbox Live, and now supports the Xbox Live Vision camera.

In November 2006, all players' bankrolls and the game's leaderboards were reset, in order to "eliminate inflated scores" that some players achieved as a result of exploits.
