= Texas Hold 'Em Poker (video game) =

2004 video game

- Developer: Skyworks Technologies
- Publisher: Majesco
- Platforms: Game Boy Advance, Nintendo DS
- Release: Game Boy Advance: NA: November 1, 2004; Nintendo DS: NA/EU: November 1, 2005
- Genre: Card game
- Modes: Single-player, multiplayer

Texas Hold 'Em Poker is a card game video game developed by Skyworks Technologies and published by Majesco for the Game Boy Advance and Nintendo DS. The Game Boy Advance version was also released on a Twin Pack cartridge bundled with Golden Nugget Casino.

== Gameplay ==
The top screen shows the community cards and the amount of money in the pot, while the bottom touchscreen shows the player's cards.

The game follows the rules and nuances of the community card game Texas hold 'em. Before starting a game, the player chooses an avatar to represent themselves at the table. The player is also able to select a tell that their avatar reveals throughout the game in attempts to confuse opponents. When it is the player's turn, they can call, raise bets, go all in, or check using the bottom touchscreen of the Nintendo DS.

While the player progresses through the game and win tournaments, additional avatars and new locations are unlocked. Despite the game's name of Texas Hold 'Em Poker, a variety of other poker games are also included, such as five-card stud and five-card draw.

== Reception ==
Reception

Aggregate scores
Aggregator	Score
GameRankings	GBA: 52%
Metacritic	GBA: 49/100

Review score
Publication	Score
IGN	6/10

Texas Hold 'Em Poker was given a score of 6.0 from video game critic website IGN, which found that although "[the game is] easy to play and still retains the fun of the Texas Hold 'Em card design in a single player fashion," "[it] still can't beat the real deal, physical computer experience, which is why it's a little upsetting that the design team didn't take advantage of elements that would work better in a virtual setting – stat tracking being a key element that's missing here." They were also disappointed with the game's lack of support for the Nintendo DS' single cartridge feature to allow other Nintendo DS systems use the same cartridge to play the game together. The review concluded by noting that Texas Hold 'Em Poker was simply a passable DS game, but that it was not much better than that.

The Sydney Morning Herald felt that the game's computer-controlled opponents acted appropriately; they bet when they had the upper hand and folded when they did not. Texas Hold 'Em Poker was given a score of 2.5 out of 5 from The Sydney Morning Herald. The video game magazine Nintendo Power gave the game a score of 50%, finding that the menu that asks the player to select a tell before every move got tiring quickly.
