= List of Stratemeyer Syndicate series =

This list of Stratemeyer Syndicate series gives the titles of all series produced by the book packaging firm the Stratemeyer Syndicate. The Syndicate was founded by Edward Stratemeyer and is best known for producing the Bobbsey Twins, Hardy Boys, Nancy Drew, Rover Boys, and Tom Swift series. The Syndicate produced these and many other series in assembly-line fashion: one person wrote the outline for a story or series of stories, another wrote the story itself, and often still another edited the work. Most Syndicate books were published under pseudonyms. The authors named in this list are those credited as having written the series; in most cases, the names are fictitious.

The Syndicate was founded in 1905. However, Edward Stratemeyer was writing series books and outlines and hiring ghostwriters before the Syndicate's incorporation; his Rover Boys series, first published in 1899 under the name Arthur M. Winfield, is sometimes considered the first Stratemeyer Syndicate series. For this reason, the list includes series beginning in 1899 with the Rover Boys. Series production was overseen by Edward Stratemeyer until his death in 1930, whereupon his daughter, Harriet Stratemeyer Adams oversaw the firm until her death in 1982. Nancy Axelrad briefly took the helm before selling the Syndicate and the rights to all its series to Simon & Schuster in 1984, which hired a different book-packager, Mega-Books, to handle future titles. Series begun in or before 1984 are therefore included in this list, but not series begun after the Syndicate's sale.

Not included in this list are proposed series, such as a Hardy Boys spin-off series featuring Chet Morton or unpublished titles. Also not included are series such as the Judy Bolton Series, the Cherry Ames Nurse Stories, or the Trixie Belden Mysteries, as these were not produced by the Syndicate.

Unless otherwise noted, information is taken from Deidre Johnson's Stratemeyer Pseudonyms and Series Books. Dates given are those of original publication, followed, if applicable, by dates of re-issue.

== Series ==
Series	Author	Begun	Ended	Re-issued	Volumes	Notes
Rover Boys	Arthur M. Winfield	1899	1926	n/a	30	
Soldiers of Fortune	Edward Stratemeyer	1900	1906	n/a	4	
Colonial	Edward Stratemeyer	1901	1906	n/a	6	
Putnam Hall	Arthur M. Winfield	1901	1911	1921	6	
Pan-American	Edward Stratemeyer	1902	1911	n/a	6	
Frontier	Captain Ralph Bonehill	1903	1906	1908, 1912	3	
Outdoor Series	Captain Ralph Bonehill	1904	1905	1908	2	
Bobbsey Twins	Laura Lee Hope	1904	1979		72	
Dave Porter	Edward Stratemeyer	1905	1919	n/a	15	
Deep Sea	Roy Rockwood	1905	1908	1918, 1926	4	
Boy Hunters	Captain Ralph Bonehill	1906	1910	n/a	4	
Boys of Business	Allen Chapman	1906	1908	n/a	4	
Boys of Pluck	Allen Chapman	1906	1911	n/a	5	
Great Marvel	Roy Rockwood	1906	1935	n/a	9	
Motor Boys	Clarence Young	1906	1924	n/a	22	
Ralph of the Railroad	Allen Chapman	1906	1933	n/a	11	
Jack Ranger	Clarence Young	1907	1911	n/a	6	
Darewell Chums	Allen Chapman	1908	1911	1917	5	
Dorothy Dale	Margaret Penrose	1908	1924	n/a	13	
Lakeport	Edward Stratemeyer	1908	1912	n/a	6	
Webster Series	Frank V. Webster	1909	1915	n/a	25	
College Sports	Lester Chadwick	1910	1913	n/a	6	
Motor Girls	Margaret Penrose	1910	1917	n/a	10	
Tom Swift	Victor Appleton	1910	1941	n/a	40	
Outdoor Chums	Captain Quincy Allen	1911	1916	n/a	8	
Baseball Joe	Lester Chadwick	1912	1928	n/a	14	
Boys of Columbia High	Graham B. Forbes	1912	1920	n/a	8	
Pioneer Boys	Harrison Adams	1912	1928	n/a	8	
Racer Boys	Clarence Young	1912	1914	n/a	6	
Tommy Tiptop	Raymond Stone	1912	1917	n/a	6	
Up and Doing	Frederick Gordon	1912	1912	n/a	3	
Dave Dashaway	Roy Rockwood	1913	1915	n/a	5	
Fred Fenton Athletic Series	Allen Chapman	1913	1915	n/a	5	
Motion Picture Chums	Victor Appleton	1913	1916	n/a	7	
Moving Picture Boys	Victor Appleton	1913	1922	n/a	15	
Outdoor Girls	Laura Lee Hope	1913	1933	n/a	23	
Ruth Fielding	Alice B. Emerson	1913	1934	n/a	30	
Saddle Boys	James Carson	1913	1915	n/a	5	
Speedwell Boys	Roy Rockwood	1913	1915	n/a	5	
Tom Fairfield	Allen Chapman	1913	1915	n/a	5	
Amy Bell Marlowe's Books for Girls	Amy Bell Marlowe	1914	1927	1933	10	
Back to the Soil	Burbank L. Todd	1914	1915	n/a	2	
Do Something	Helen Beecher Long	1914	1919	n/a	5	
Fairview Boys	Frederick Gordon	1914	1917	n/a	6	
Girls of Central High	Gertrude W. Morrison	1914	1919	n/a	7	
Moving Picture Girls	Laura Lee Hope	1914	1916	n/a	7	
University	Roy Eliot Stokes	1914	1914	n/a	2	
Bobby Blake	Frank A. Warner	1915	1926	n/a	12	
Corner House Girls	Grace Brooks Hill	1915	1926	n/a	13	
Kneetime Animal Stories	Richard Barnum	1915	1922	n/a	17	
White Ribbon Boys	Raymond Sperry, Jr.	1915	1916	n/a	2	
Bunny Brown and his Sister Sue	Laura Lee Hope	1916	1931	n/a	20	
Joe Strong	Vance Barnum	1916	1916	n/a	7	
Nan Sherwood	Annie Roe Carr	1916	1937	n/a	7	
Rushton Boys	Spencer Davenport	1916	1916	n/a	3	
Y.M.C.A. Boys	Brooks Henderley	1916	1917	n/a	3	
Motion Picture Comrades	Elmer Tracey Barnes	1917	1917	n/a	5	
Air Service Boys	Charles Amory Beach	1918	1920	n/a	6	
Carolyn	Ruth Belmore Endicott	1918	1919	n/a	2	
Dave Fearless	Roy Rockwood	1918	1927	n/a	17	
Six Little Bunkers	Laura Lee Hope	1918	1930	1933	14	
Betty Gordon	Alice B. Emerson	1920	1932	n/a	15	
Billie Bradley	Janet D. Wheeler	1920	1932	n/a	9	
Four Little Blossoms	Mabel C. Hawley	1920	1930	1938	7	
Make Believe Stories	Laura Lee Hope	1920	1923	n/a	12	
Oriole	Amy Bell Marlowe	1920	1933	n/a	4	
Sunny Boy	Ramy Allison White	1920	1931	n/a	14	
Frank and Andy	Vance Barnum	1921	1921	n/a	3	
Radio Boys	Allen Chapman	1922	1930	n/a	13	
Radio Girls	Margaret Penrose	1922	1924	n/a	4	
Honey Bunch	Helen Louise Thorndyke	1923	1955	n/a	34	
Riddle Club	Alice Dale Hardy	1924	1929	n/a	6	
Blythe Girls	Laura Lee Hope	1925	1932	n/a	12	
Don Sturdy	Victor Appleton	1925	1935	n/a	15	
Flyaways	Alice Dale Hardy	1925	1925	n/a	3	
Barton Books for Girls	May Hollis Barton	1926	1937	n/a	16	
Bomba, the Jungle Boy	Roy Rockwood	1926	1938	1953, 1978	20	
Frank Allen	Graham B. Forbes	1926	1927	n/a	17	
Garry Grayson Football Stories	Elmer A. Dawson	1926	1932	n/a	10	
Movie Boys	Victor Appleton	1926	1927	n/a	17	
Nat Ridley Rapid Fire Detective Stories	Nat Ridley, Jr.	1926	1927	n/a	17	
X Bar X Boys	James Cody Ferris	1926	1942	n/a	21	
Hardy Boys Mystery Stories	Franklin W. Dixon	1927	2005	n/a	190	
Ted Scott Flying Stories	Franklin W. Dixon	1927	1943	n/a	20	
Bob Chase Big Game Series	Frank A. Warner	1929	1930	n/a	4	
Lanky Lawson	Harry Mason Roe	1929	1930	n/a	4	
Roy Stover	Philip A. Bartlett	1929	1934	n/a	4	
Buck and Larry Baseball Stories	Elmer A. Dawson	1930	1932	n/a	5	
Campfire Girls	Margaret Penrose	1930	1930	n/a	4	
Nancy Drew Mystery Stories	Carolyn Keene	1930	2003	n/a	175	
Slim Tyler Air Stories	Richard H. Stone	1930	1936	n/a	7	
Doris Force	Julia K. Duncan	1931	1932	n/a	4	
Jerry Ford Wonder Stories	Fenworth Moore	1931	1932	1937	4	
Perry Pierce	Clinton W. Locke	1931	1934	n/a	4	
Sky Flyers	Eugene Martin	1931	1933	n/a	4	
Dana Girls Mystery Stories	Carolyn Keene	1934	1979	n/a	34	
Kay Tracey Mystery Stories	Frances K. Judd	1934	1942	1951–1953, 1961, 1964, 1978, 1980.	18	
Mary and Jerry Mystery Stories	Francis Hunt	1935	1937	n/a	5	
Mel Martin Baseball Stories	John R. Cooper	1947	1947	1952–1953	6	
The Happy Hollisters	Jerry West	1953	1970	1979	33	
Tom Swift, Jr.	Victor Appleton II	1954	1971	n/a	33	
Honey Bunch and Norman Stories	Helen Louise Thorndyke	1954	1963	n/a	12	
Bret King Mystery Stories	Dan Scott	1960	1964	n/a	9	
Linda Craig	Ann Sheldon	1962	1964	1981–1984	6	
Christopher Cool, TEEN Agent	Jack Lancer	1967	1969	n/a	6	
Tolliver Adventure Series	Alan Stone	1967	1967	n/a	3	
Wynn and Lonny Racing Series	Eric Speed	1975	1978	n/a	6	
Nancy Drew Picture Books	Carolyn Keene	1977	1977	n/a	2	
Tom Swift III	Victor Appleton	1981	1984	n/a	11	
