= Charles Nuttall =

Australian artist

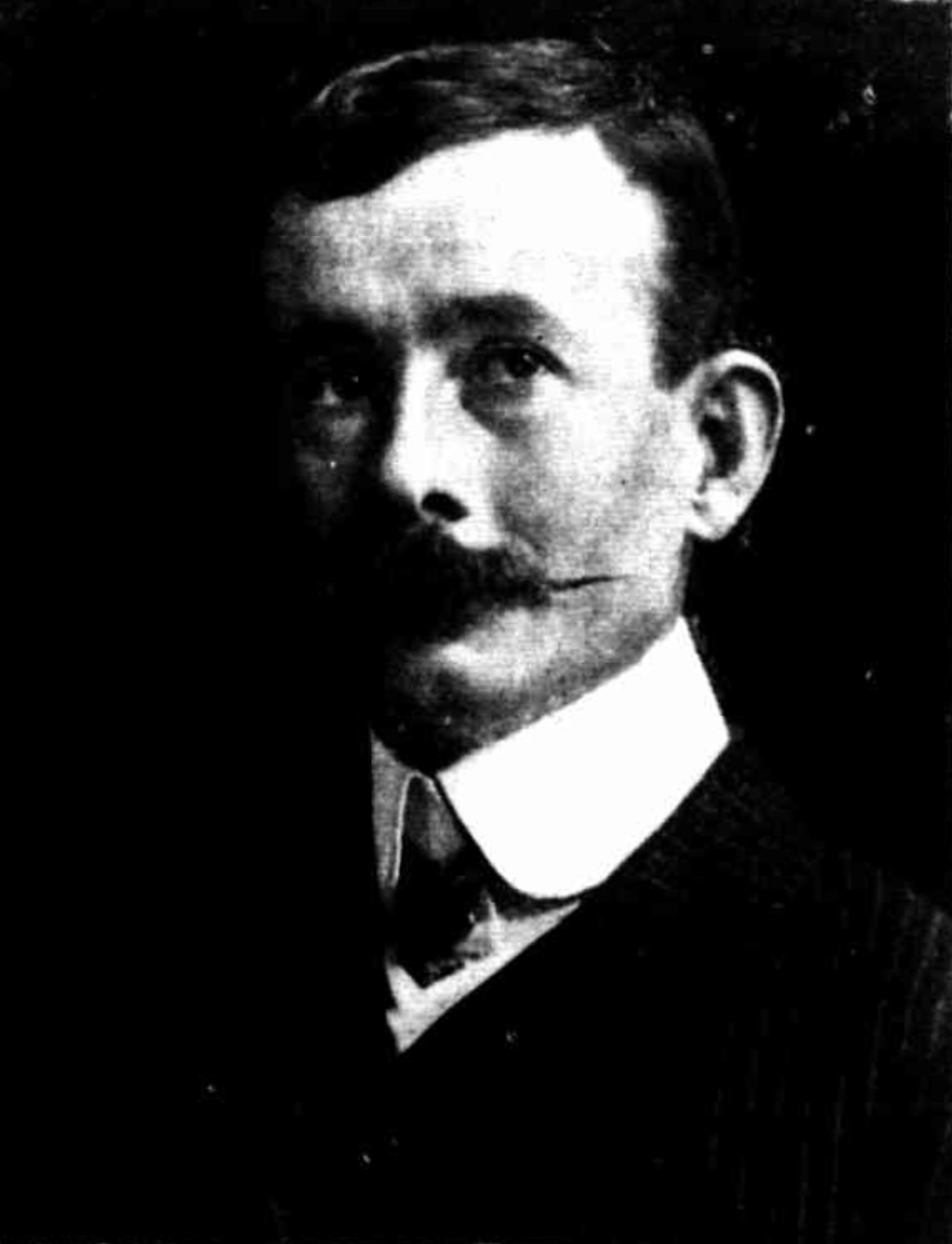
- Charles Nuttall in 1902
- Born: James Charles Nuttall; 6 September 1872; Fitzroy, Victoria, Australia
- Died: 28 November 1934 (aged 62); South Yarra, Victoria, Australia
- Occupations: Artist, cartoonist, illustrator, writer, broadcaster

Signature
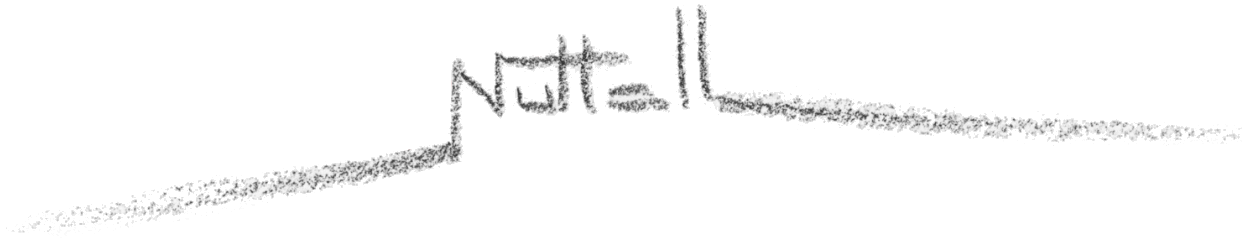

Charles Nuttall (born James Charles Nuttall; 6 September 1872 – 28 November 1934) was a prolific Australian artist, writer and radio broadcaster. He spent much of his working life in Melbourne, apart from a period in New York City from 1905 to 1910.

Nuttall became widely known as an artist for his large-scale painting of the opening of the first Australian parliament in 1901. His painting, completed in June 1902, was notable for the large number of identifiable portraits of the dignitaries present at the ceremony. Framed prints of the painting were marketed as patriotic adornments suitable for public buildings, schools, places of business and private homes. During the next few years Nuttall produced book illustrations, political cartoons and began a life-long association as a writer and artist for the Australian edition of Life magazine.

In 1905 Nuttall travelled to the United States and established himself in New York City, He was employed by the New York Herald to draw the 'Buster Brown' comic strip and had his cartoons and illustrations published in a variety of illustrated magazines. He was employed as a book illustrator for the Stratemeyer Syndicate company which produced fiction for children. Nuttall illustrated an estimated 64 different titles over a period of about three years for the company.

Nuttall returned to Australia in 1910 and established a studio in Melbourne, where he produced cartoons, book illustrations and taught drawing classes. He was employed as a cartoonist for Melbourne's Punch from 1913 to 1918. In 1926 he began a career as a radio broadcaster, delivering talks on a wide-range of subjects.

== Biography ==
=== Early years ===
James Charles Nuttall was born on 6 September 1872 in the Melbourne suburb of Fitzroy, the eldest born and only son of James Charles Nuttall and Caroline (née Dean). His English-born father was a house-painter and decorator.

After leaving school Nuttall probably spent a number of years working for his father. His parents encouraged their son to pursue an artistic career and in 1895 Charles Nuttall enrolled in the Art School conducted at the National Gallery of Victoria in Melbourne. The drawing classes were held under the instruction of Frederick McCubbin and under his guidance Nuttall developed a confident linear style of illustration. Constrained by colour blindness, Nuttall focussed on black and white and monochrome work.

=== The Melbourne arts community ===
Nuttall joined the Victorian Artists' Society in 1896, where he was an occasional exhibitor. At the Society's annual meeting in November 1901 he was elected as a member of council.^{[A]}

Nuttall was a prominent member of Melbourne's bohemian community of writers, artists and poets. He belonged to the Melbourne Savage Club, a private social club with a bohemian spirit.

In 1898 and 1899 Nuttall conducted drawing classes at the Collingwood School of Art held in the Collingwood Town Hall.

Nuttall was an early member of the Melbourne Black and White Club which formed in 1900. A number of Nuttall's "spirited chalk-drawings" (described as being "admirable as rapid studies") were included in the club's first exhibition held in July 1900 at their rooms at 62 Elizabeth Street. In December 1900 Nuttall gave a lecture at the Black and White Club discussing 'What is Art?', attended by about forty people. After the lecture the architect and artist Robert J. Haddon remarked that "it was only a very young man who would attempt to lecture on the great question upon which older artists hesitate to give an opinion"; Haddon added that "he admired his pluck, and enjoyed the lecture, which, after all, was the chief thing". Nuttall served as secretary of the Black and White Club. About a year the club's formation it was affiliated with the Victorian Artists' Society.

From about September 1901 cartoons by Nuttall were occasionally published in The Bulletin magazine, based in Sydney.

=== The opening of parliament painting ===
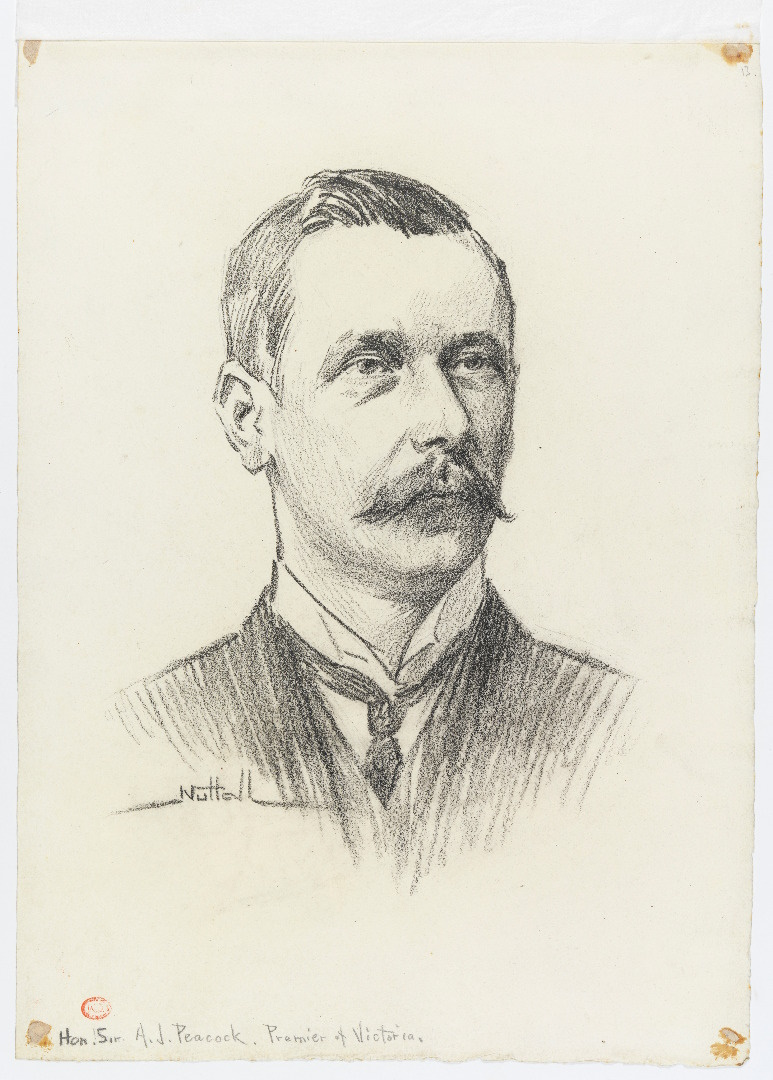
Portrait of Alexander J. Peacock, premier of Victoria.

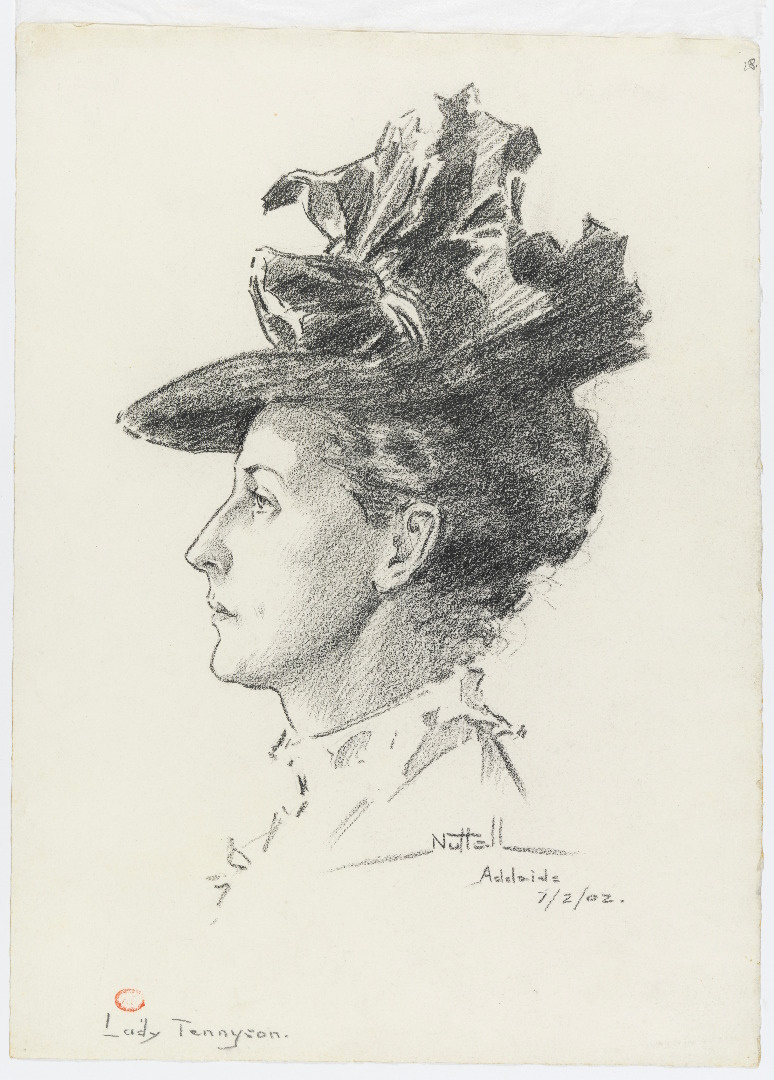
Portrait of Lady Tennyson, wife of the Governor of South Australia.

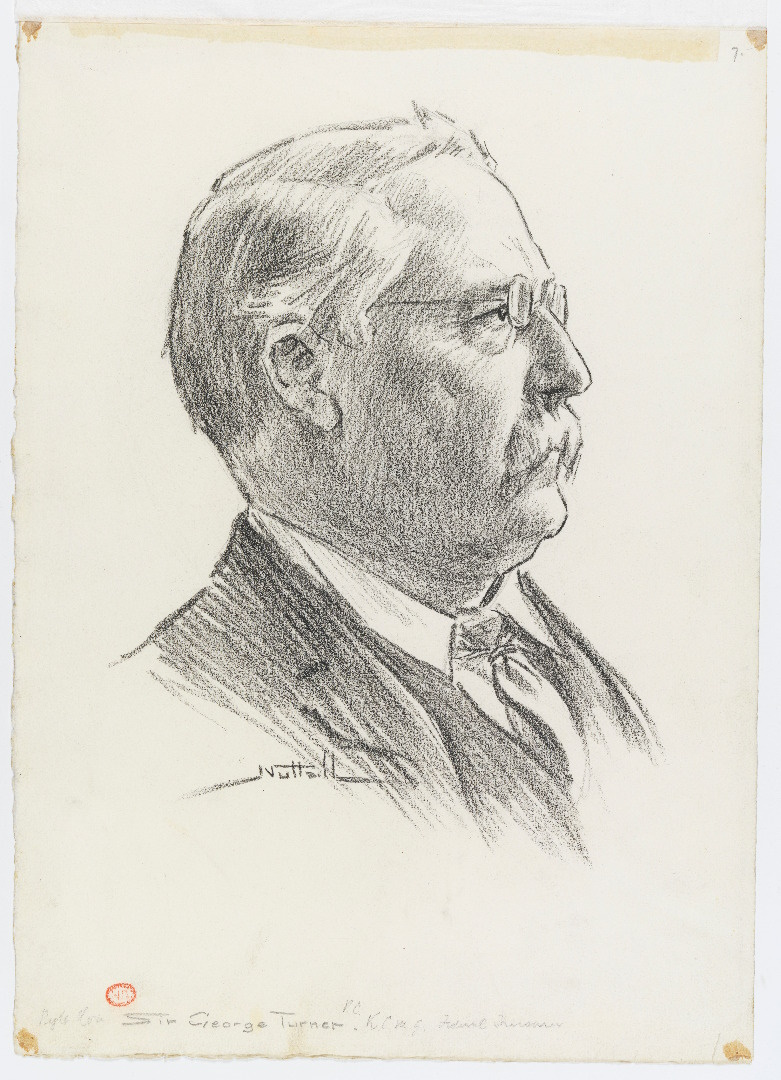
Portrait of George Turner, first treasurer of Australia.

A selection of the preparatory portraits by Charles Nuttall for his painting of the first opening of the Australian parliament.

After Federation the first Australian parliament was opened on 9 May 1901 by Prince George, the Duke of Cornwall and York, in a ceremony held in the western annexe of the Royal Exhibition Building in Melbourne. Charles Nuttall was commissioned by the Commonwealth Publishing Company Ltd. (described as "a little band of patriotic citizens") to paint a picture of the historic event. The artist began work on the painting in oils in August 1901, in a studio within the Exhibition Building on a canvas measuring 12 by 8 feet (3.65 by 2.4 metres). Nuttall was asked to include as many recognisable faces as possible in his painting, for which purpose he arranged sittings with some of the attendees in order to sketch their features in preparatory drawings. In October 1901 the artist was granted sittings at Government House in Melbourne to capture portraits of John Hope, the Earl of Hopetoun and Australia's first Governor-General, as well as his wife the Countess of Hopetoun, Major-General Downes and Captain Wellington (the Governor-General's private secretary). Nuttall was required to travel to other states to complete some of his preparatory drawings. In early February 1902 he travelled by steamer to Adelaide to complete sketches of the Governor and other "prominent" South Australians who had attended the parliamentary opening.

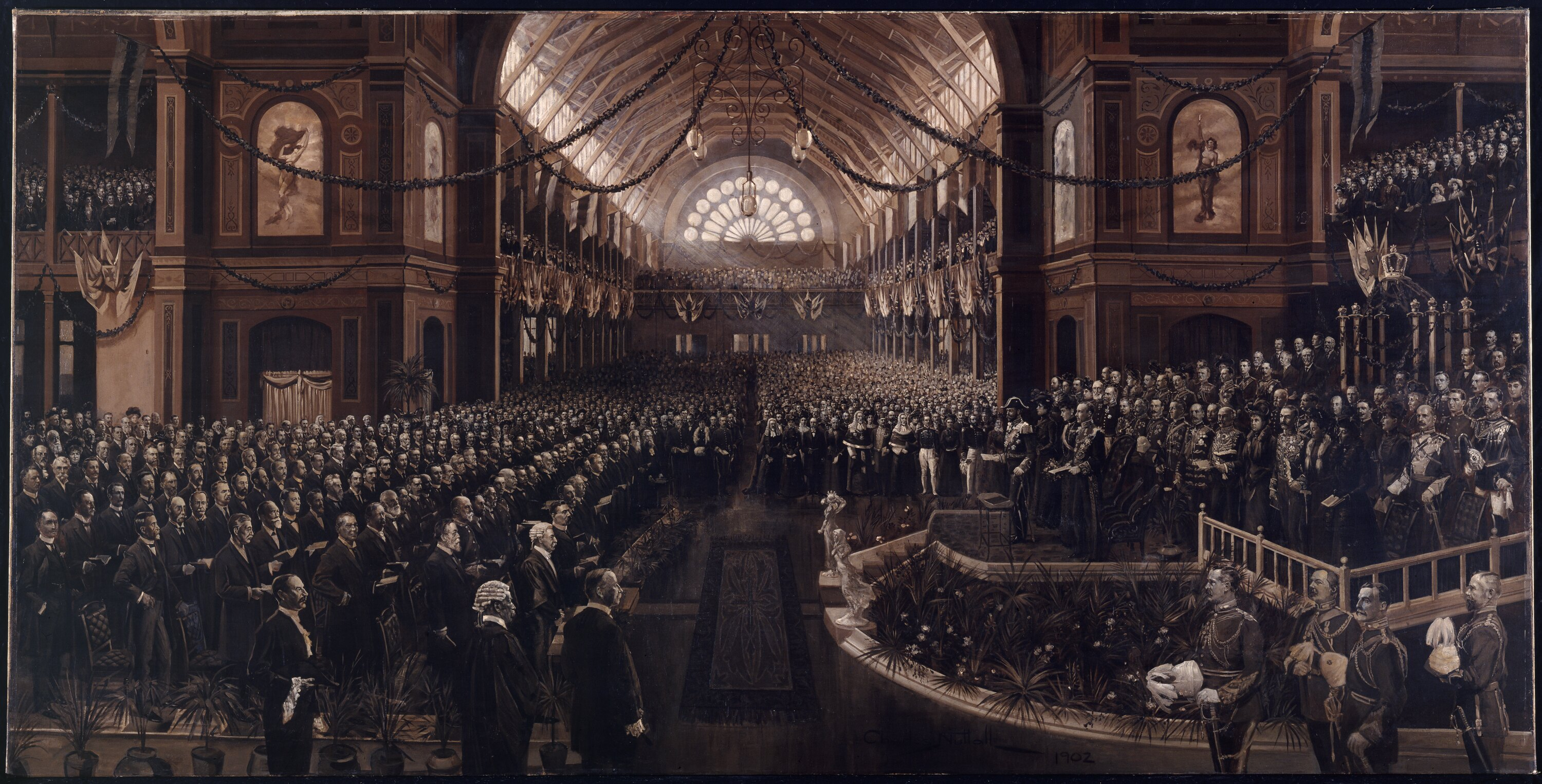
'Opening of First Australian Federal Parliament by H.R.H. the Duke of Cornwall & York' (oil on canvas) by Charles Nuttall, completed in 1902.

Nuttall's large monochromatic sepia-toned painting depicting the opening of parliament was unveiled in June 1902. The painting included a total of 343 identifiable portraits of the dignitaries present at the historic ceremony. The writer for the Table Talk weekly newspaper at the unveiling was candid about the painting's artistic merits, commenting that Nuttall had "not attempted to make his work beautiful... his work was purely commercial". The writer added: "Every politician had to be placed in as prominent a position as possible, for no politician would allow his brilliant personality to be sacrificed for aesthetic truth". The article concluded: "From the artistic point, it is hardly fair to judge Mr. Nuttall's work at all, but the painter may be congratulated on having produced a picture that has been conscientiously treated, and that, we hope, will have considerable commercial value".

After its completion the painting was sent to Paris to be reproduced by a photogravure process by the art dealership of Goupil & Cie, internationally known for their fine art reproductions. By March 1903 the painting had been shipped to London where photogravure prints were produced by the fine art publisher, James Greves of New Bridge Street. The painting was sent to Buckingham Palace to be inspected by King Edward VII, after which it was exhibited at McLean's Gallery in the Haymarket.^{[B]}

In August 1902 a publication called Representative Australians: A Series of Portraits from Original Sketches was issued by McCarron, Bird & Co. of Melbourne, presenting a portfolio of reproductions of forty of Nuttall's portraits rendered in preparation for his painting of the parliament opening ceremony.

An entity called the Historical Picture Association of Australia, under the management of Abraham S. Gordon, obtained the sole rights to sell and distribute reproductions of Nuttall's painting. Framed prints were marketed as patriotic adornments suitable for public buildings, schools, places of business and private homes. Prints were sold at three guineas (£3 3s.) each (described as "Best India Prints"), in addition to limited numbers of more expensive "artists' proofs and prints before letters". The sale of prints of Nuttall's painting suffered in comparison to Tom Roberts' painting of the same subject, completed in November 1903, of which monochromatic sepia-toned photogravure prints were also sold (thus competing with the sale of prints of Nuttall's painting). In newspaper advertisements and a pamphlet issued in connection with the sale of prints of Nuttall's painting the claim was made that the painting "was produced under the personal patronage of all members of the Federal Government", but this claim was refuted by the prime minister, Edmund Barton, after enquiries were made by the group that had commissioned Tom Roberts' painting. The marketing of the prints of Nuttall's painting by A. S. Gordon after July 1903 became the subject of controversy in the colonial press in the ensuing years, with reports of his activities including allegations of fraudulent behaviour.^{[C]}

=== Illustrator and cartoonist ===
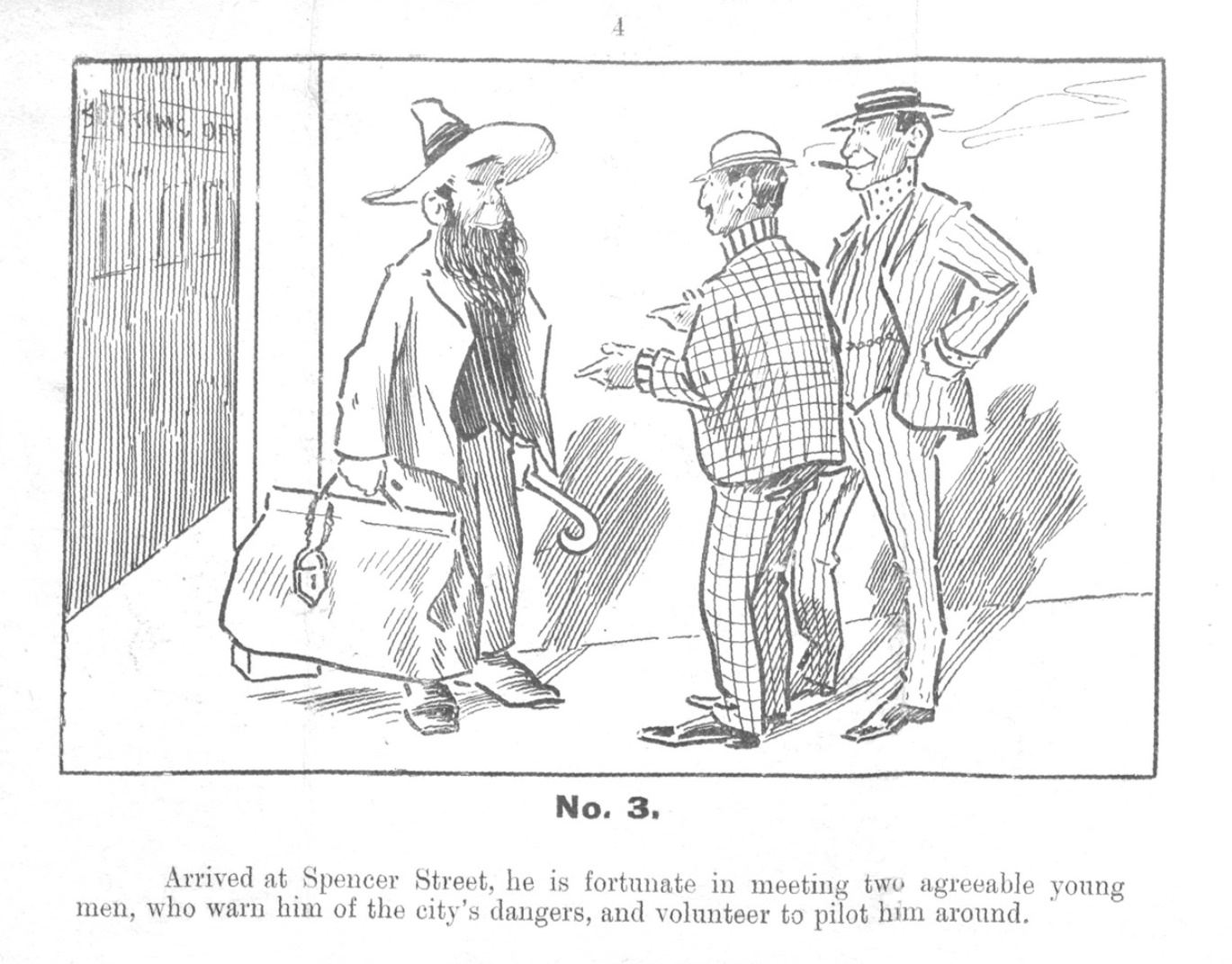
An illustration from Nuttall's Peter Wayback Visits the Melbourne Cup, published in 1903.

In 1903 a booklet by Nuttall titled Peter Wayback Visits the Melbourne Cup: 15 Humourous Sketches, selling for threepence each, was published by Edgerton and Moore of Melbourne.

Nuttall produced twelve illustrations for Tales of Old Times: Early Australian Incident and Adventure, written by C. H. Chomley and published in 1903 by W. T. Pater & Co. in Melbourne. Chomley's book covered aspects of Australian history such as the founding of Sydney, the Myall Creek massacre in 1838 and the Diamond Creek bushrangers (Fogarty, Jepps and Ellis, hanged in Melbourne in 1842).

In January 1904 it was reported that Nuttall had been commissioned by the Melbourne Cricket Club to complete a painting of the final test match between Australia and England, to be held at the Melbourne Cricket Ground in early March 1904. The painting, on a canvas measuring 8 by 5 feet (2.4 by 1.5 metres), was completed during the week after the final day of the test match. The painting depicted a mass of spectators in the grandstand at the Melbourne Cricket Ground in the background. The foreground was made up of a large group of men (with about one hundred recognisable faces) in front of the members' stand, including the members of the English team taking the field and the Australian team members amongst the group in the members' reserve. The other figures in the foreground included administrators, distinguished guests and cricketing veterans. Nuttall's painting was reproduced by the Australian Fine Arts Publishing Company and prints were sold for one guinea (or three guineas for an artist's proof). The original painting was installed in one of the rooms of the Melbourne Cricket Club.

In January 1904 the Melbourne publishers, the Fitchett brothers, launched an Australian edition of Life magazine, published monthly. The March 1904 issue included an interview with Charles Nuttall (in 'The Day's Work' series). The article, illustrated by the artist, included an account of how he painted his test match picture over a period of six weeks. Nuttall's drawings were used to illustrate an article in the July 1904 issue of Life, written by the pianist, Ignacy Jan Paderewski (then touring in Australia), in which he "gives a bright and breezy account of his 'day's work'". Nuttall's illustrations were described as "sketches from life", one of which was "a very fine whole-page study of the pianist's head, drawn whilst he was actually playing the piano". Nuttall also had his work published in The New Idea, another of the Fitchett brothers' publications.

In June 1904 Nuttall was appointed as the "special cartoonist" for Melbourne's Table Talk magazine, replacing Claude Marquet who had left Victoria "to fill an important position in a neighbouring State". Nuttall became responsible for the regular double-page political cartoons in the body of the weekly journal. From March 1905 his cartoons were published on page three of the magazine (the leading page after the advertisements). Nuttall's final feature cartoon for Table Talk was published in the 29 June 1905 issue.

In early 1905 Nuttall designed the cover of an information booklet about the Australian Women's National Club that had been established in Melbourne. The club was associated with the Australian Women's National League, a conservative political lobby group with the objective of influencing female voters.

By June 1905 it had become known that Nuttall intended to depart for America to further his career. On the eve of his overseas departure a writer for Adelaide's weekly magazine, The Critic, described Nuttall as "a newspaper artist of the 'useful' type", adding: "None of his work is particularly brilliant, and as a caricaturist he is not prominent". Nuttall left for the United States on 10 July 1905 aboard the steamship R.M.S. Manuka.

=== New York ===
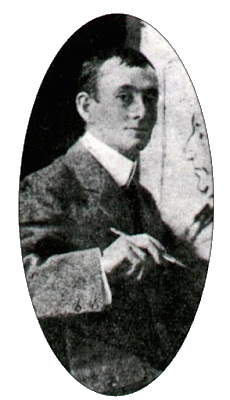
Charles Nuttall at work.

After arriving in the United States Charles Nuttall established himself in a studio in New York City. An article written by the artist recording his impressions of New York was published in the January 1906 issue of the Australian edition of Life. The article was titled 'Glimpses of New York: An Australian in America' and was illustrated with his sketches.^{[D]}

During his years in New York Nuttall had cartoons and illustrations published in a number of the New York-based illustrated magazines such as Life, The Century Magazine, Scribner's Magazine and Harper's Bazaar. During 1907 several of his cartoons were published in the humour section of Harper's Bazaar (in the September and December editions). One of Nuttall's cartoons was used as the cover illustration for the 9 January 1908 edition of Life.

Nuttall joined the staff of the New York Herald and was engaged to draw the 'Buster Brown' comic strip, possibly as early as 1906. The 'Buster Brown' character had been created by Richard F. Outcault in May 1902 for the New York Herald. In January 1906 Outcault was hired by the Hearst newspaper group and tried to bring the 'Buster Brown' comic strip with him. In a subsequent court decision the Herald retained the rights to the name 'Buster Brown' and continued to publish the comic strip in its Sunday edition using other artists. Outcault continued to draw the character as well, now nameless, in comic strips published in Hearst-owned rival newspapers. The New York Herald also retained the rights to Outcault's work undertaken during his previous employment by the newspaper. The New York publishers Cupples & Leon Co. took over the reprint rights for Outcault's Herald comic strips. The first volume by Cupples & Leon, Buster Brown, His Dog Tige and Their Jolly Times, compiling part of the final series of Outcault's Herald comic strips, was published in 1906 with a cover by Charles Nuttall. The fact that Nuttall was involved as early as 1906 possibly indicates that he was employed to draw the 'Buster Brown' comic strip soon after Outcault's departure. Contrary to the usual practice, the post-Outcault 'Buster Brown' comic strips were not signed by the artist, but each one displayed a copyright notification (for example "Copyright, 1906 by the New York Herald Co.").

Nuttall's New York studio was located nearby to the residence of the celebrated writer and humorist Mark Twain, then aged in his early seventies. One day in 1907 the artist visited Twain and undertook a number of sketches of the writer. Later the two men played billiards, "in a game of 100 up" (that was comprehensively won by Twain). After Mark Twain died in April 1910 an article written by Nuttall recalling details of the visit, and illustrated by his sketches of the writer, was published in the June issue of the Australian Life.

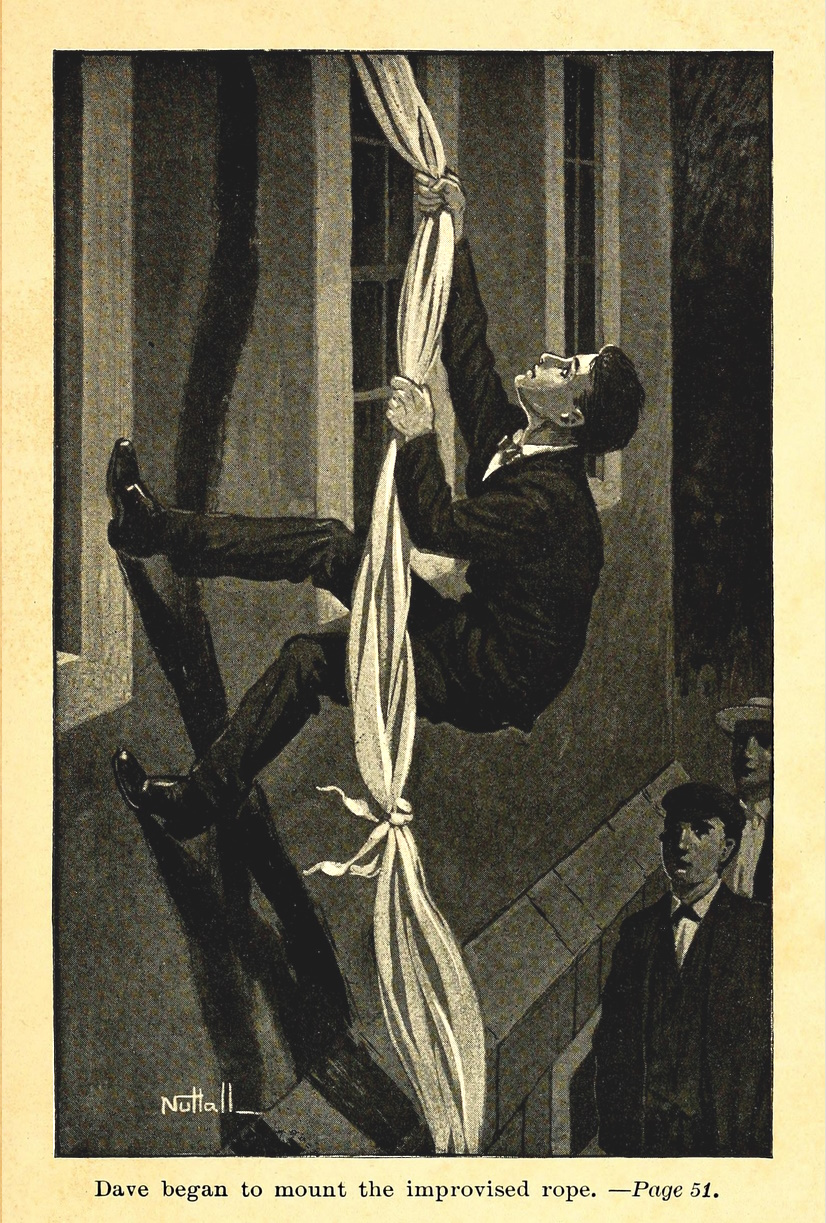
An illustration by Nuttall for Dave Porter's Return to School (1907) by Edward Stratemeyer.

In about March 1907 the prolific writer of children's fiction Edward Stratemeyer met with Charles Nuttall in New York, an encounter that led to the artist being commissioned to provide the illustrations for an estimated 64 different titles over a period of about three years for the Stratemeyer Syndicate book packaging company. Stratemeyer's company organised the production of fiction books for children, written by Stratemeyer and a team of freelance writers and using publishers in New York and Boston. The books were published in series featuring the same characters, often using pseudonyms for the author's name. Stratemeyer's regular artist, Augustus Shute, had died in March 1906 and Stratemeyer was displeased with the artists commissioned since then by his Boston publisher to illustrate his books in the 'Dave Porter' series. When Dave Porter's Return to School, the third volume in the series, was published in March 1907, the publisher had chosen F. Gilbert Edge to do the artwork, but Stratemeyer was appalled by Edge's pictures after he was sent an advance copy of the book in early 1907. In a letter to the publisher Stratemeyer expressed his feelings: "I am so disgusted, disheartened and discouraged I hardly know what to say further". He ordered that any copies of the book already sent to booksellers be recalled. Stratemeyer resolved to find an artist to provide replacement artwork for Dave Porter's Return to School and decided to meet with Nuttall. Stratemeyer was already familiar with Nuttall's work as the artist had been engaged during 1906 to illustrate a number of Stratemeyer Syndicate titles that were published by Cupples & Leon Co. in New York (the same company publishing the 'Buster Brown' compilations). After their meeting Stratemeyer gave Nuttall written instructions of his requirements. He requested that the artist use Shute's illustrations as a stylistic guide "but give us something clean-cut and gentlemanly", adding that "we prefer pictures 'filled out' to the marginal lines". Nuttall's artwork for Dave Porter's Return to School was included in the republished volume. Nuttall was commissioned to produce illustrations for many of the Stratemeyer Syndicate titles for the remainder of his period of working in America.

In August 1908 Nuttall returned to Australia for a brief visit (via the Canadian-Australian steamer 'R.M.S. Marama'), staying with his parents in the Melbourne suburb of Clifton Hill. The artist intimated that after returning to New York "he has contracts to fulfill which will take him well on to the end of next year". A selection of Nuttall's "character sketches from life", titled 'Americans To-day', was published in Melbourne's Table Talk in September 1908; the full-page of illustrations included various stereotypical images of racial and ethnic groups.

In March 1909 it was reported that Life magazine in New York had offered Nuttall "a retainer of a thousand dollars a year for first call on his work".

Nuttall departed from New York in June 1910 "to take a three months' holiday trip through Europe" before returning to Australia. Prior to his departure the staff of Life magazine gave a farewell dinner for the artist. It was reported that Nuttall intended "doing numerous sketches abroad with the view of holding an exhibition in Melbourne on his return".

=== Return to Australia ===
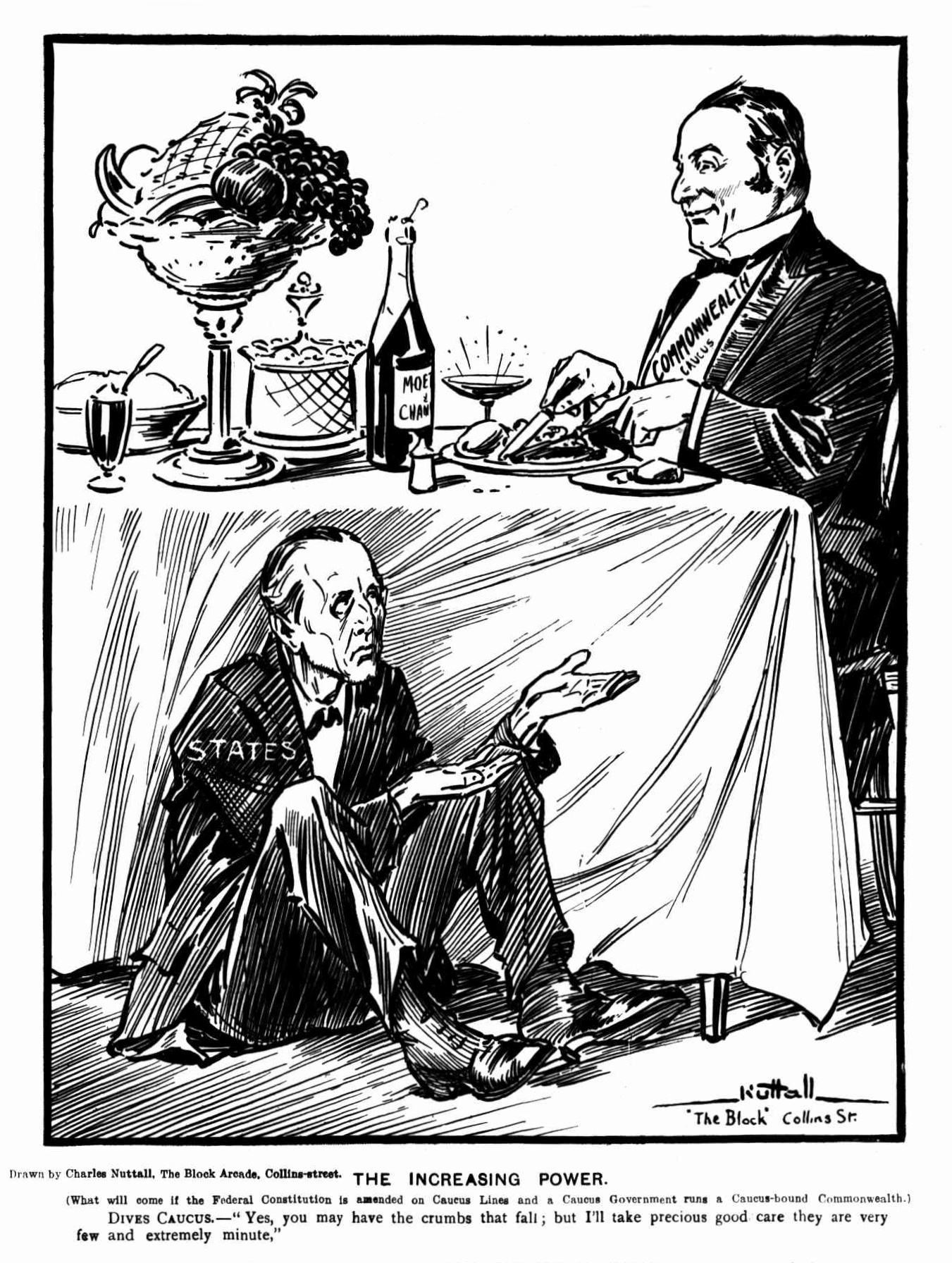
'The Increasing Power', a political cartoon by Nuttall, published in Punch (Melbourne), 24 April 1913.

Nuttall returned to Melbourne from Europe in November 1910 aboard the mail steamer Bremen. In an interview after his arrival the artist declared: "There is such a big demand for artistic work in New York that any man with original ideas and matter is absolutely sure of a field there". He added that "the daily paper humorist is one of the most highly-paid and hardest to get" and "the man who has succeeded in Melbourne should certainly succeed in New York, but there is no earthly chance for the third-rater". On the subject of American humor Nuttall was of the opinion that it "must be broad", adding: "In spite of their many good qualities, the Americans are not a humorous people. Subtleties are lost. The idea must be thrown out in bold outlines".

Nuttall became a regular contributor to Everylady's Journal (previously New Idea), first published under its new name in June 1911.

In 1911 Nuttall was one of seven artists who contributed illustrations to a publication commemorating an incident in the Second Boer War in February 1900 when members of the Victorian Mounted Rifles were part of a force covering the retreat of the Wiltshire regiment by holding a kopje named Pink Hill, west of Rensburg, against overwhelming odds. The Victorian casualties were the first of the war.

Nuttall's political cartoons were regularly published in Melbourne's Punch from 24 April 1913 to at least December 1918. In June 1916 an exhibition of cartoon illustrations by Nuttall and George Dancey, both artists working for Melbourne's Punch newspaper, was held at the Athenaeum Hall. The exhibition, titled 'The Story of the War in Cartoon', "commanded much attention and appreciation". Nuttall was politically conservative and strongly nationalist. During the conscription debate Nuttall was in favour of a 'yes' vote, made apparent by his cartoon in Punch showing voters equally balanced on a giant scale, 'yes' on one side and 'no' on the other. Titled 'Weigh in With the Yesses', the text beneath the drawing pointed out: "in a case like this above, your individual vote will be of great weight".

Charles Nuttall and Leila Blackbourn were married on 4 December 1918 in St. John's Anglican church in Toorak. The couple had no children.

=== Later years ===
In the early 1920s Nuttall taught classes in black and white drawing, caricature and commercial art at his studio in the Block Arcade in Collins Street.

In the mid-1920s Nuttall undertook an extended trip through Europe and the Malay Peninsula and Indonesian islands. From his period of working in New York and his subsequent world travels, Nuttall made use of his experiences and sketches in his pictorial journalism in Life magazine and other publications, as well as during his later radio talks in the late 1920s and 1930s.

In 1926 Nuttall began a series of "travel talks" on the Melbourne radio station 3LO. Nuttall established a reputation as an engaging and wide-ranging broadcaster, known for "his wit, travelogues, and his healthy philosophy". His talks were broadcast on both 3LO and 3AR from 1926 until 1934 (the year of his death).

In July 1927 Nuttall contributed an article to the Australian Life, described as his "discourses on the world at large and its affairs". His writings and sketches became a regular feature of the magazine under the heading of 'The World at Large'. The last instalment of 'The World at Large' was published in December 1934, written before his death on 28 November. Nuttall had been a contributor to the Australian edition of Life since its inception in 1904, both as a writer and artist.

Charles Nuttall died on 28 November 1934, aged 62, of a cerebral haemorrhage at his home in Pasley Street, in the Melbourne suburb of South Yarra. He was buried in Boroondara General Cemetery in Kew.

The December 1934 issue of the Australian Life magazine included a tribute to Nuttall, written by W. A. Somerset Shum.

== Exhibitions ==
- June 1916, 'The Story of the War in Cartoon' exhibition by Nuttall and George Dancey (both working for Melbourne's Punch newspaper), held at the Athenaeum Hall.
- 1931 (3 November - 17 December): Group show with John Shirlow, Esther Paterson and Allan Jordan. Fine Art Galleries, Melbourne. Nuttall contributed a number of etchings to the exhibition, mostly of images originating from the artist's travels in Europe (including portraits such as 'A Peasant of Tyrol' and 'A Fisherman of Volendam').
- 1934 (during September): group show of etchings with sixteen other exhibitors at the Newman Art Gallery in Collins Street; other artists included John Shirlow, Victor Cobb, Oscar Binder, J. C. Goodhart, Sydney Ure Smith, Jessie C. Traill, Harold Herbert, John C. Goodchild, Cyril Dillon and Allan Jordan.
- 1934 (during October): exhibition of Nuttall's etching and drawings at the Newman Art Gallery.
- 1935 (6 November): A posthumous exhibition of Nuttall's artwork at Hogan's Gallery, 340 Little Collins Street.

== Gallery ==
A selection of images by Charles Nuttall
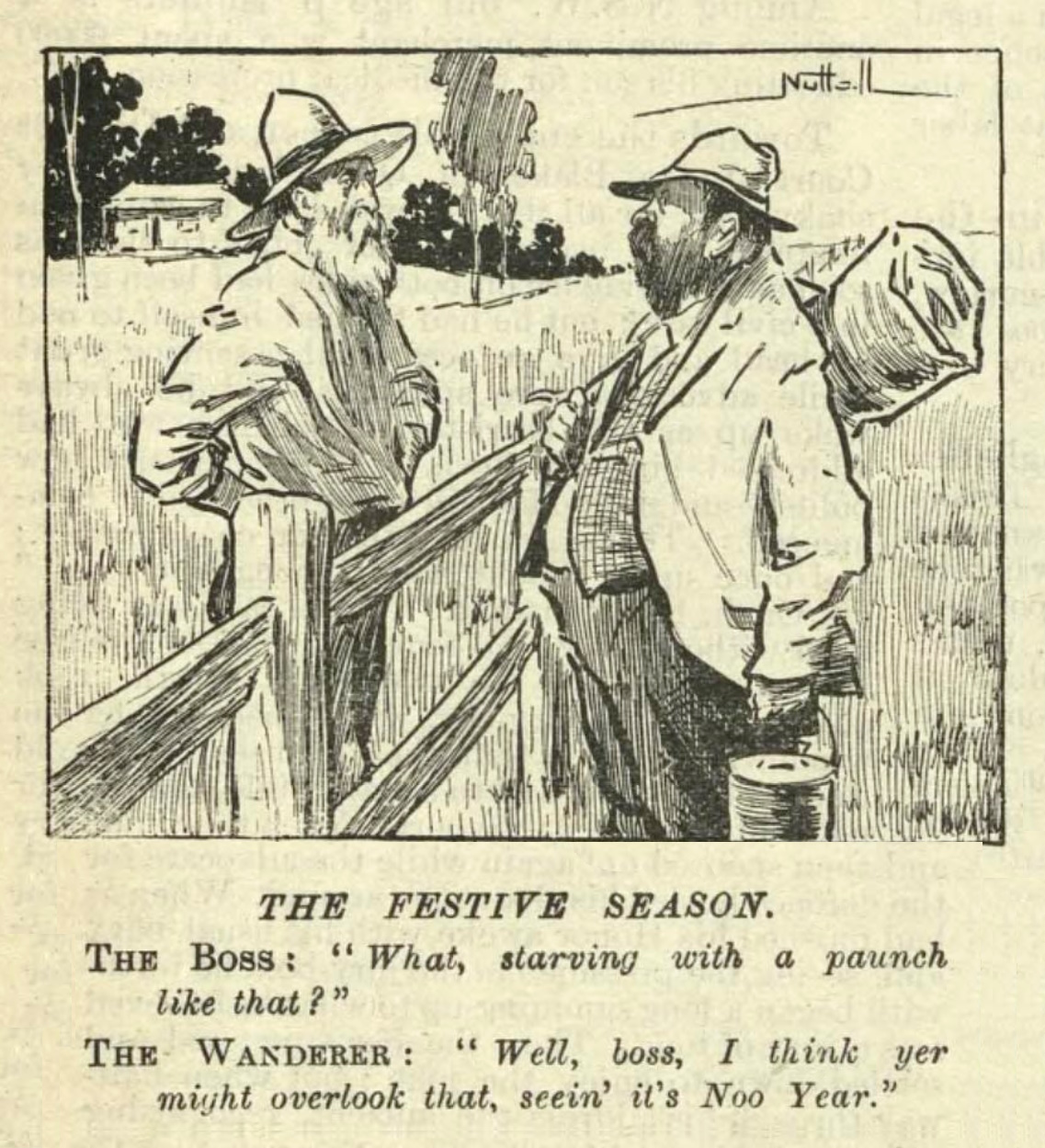
'The Festive Season', cartoon published in The Bulletin, 25 January 1902.

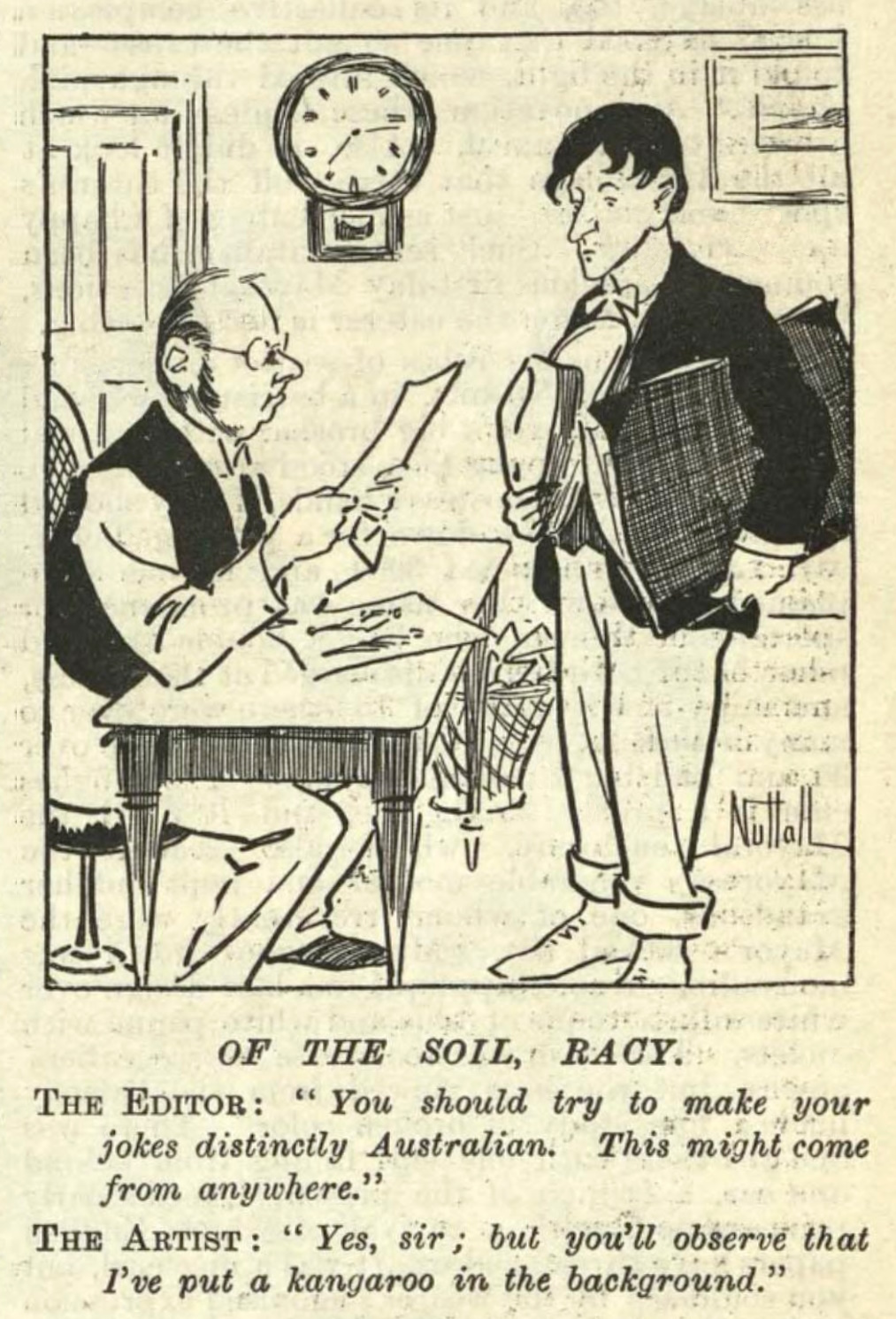
'Of the Soil, Racy', cartoon published in The Bulletin, 12 April 1902.

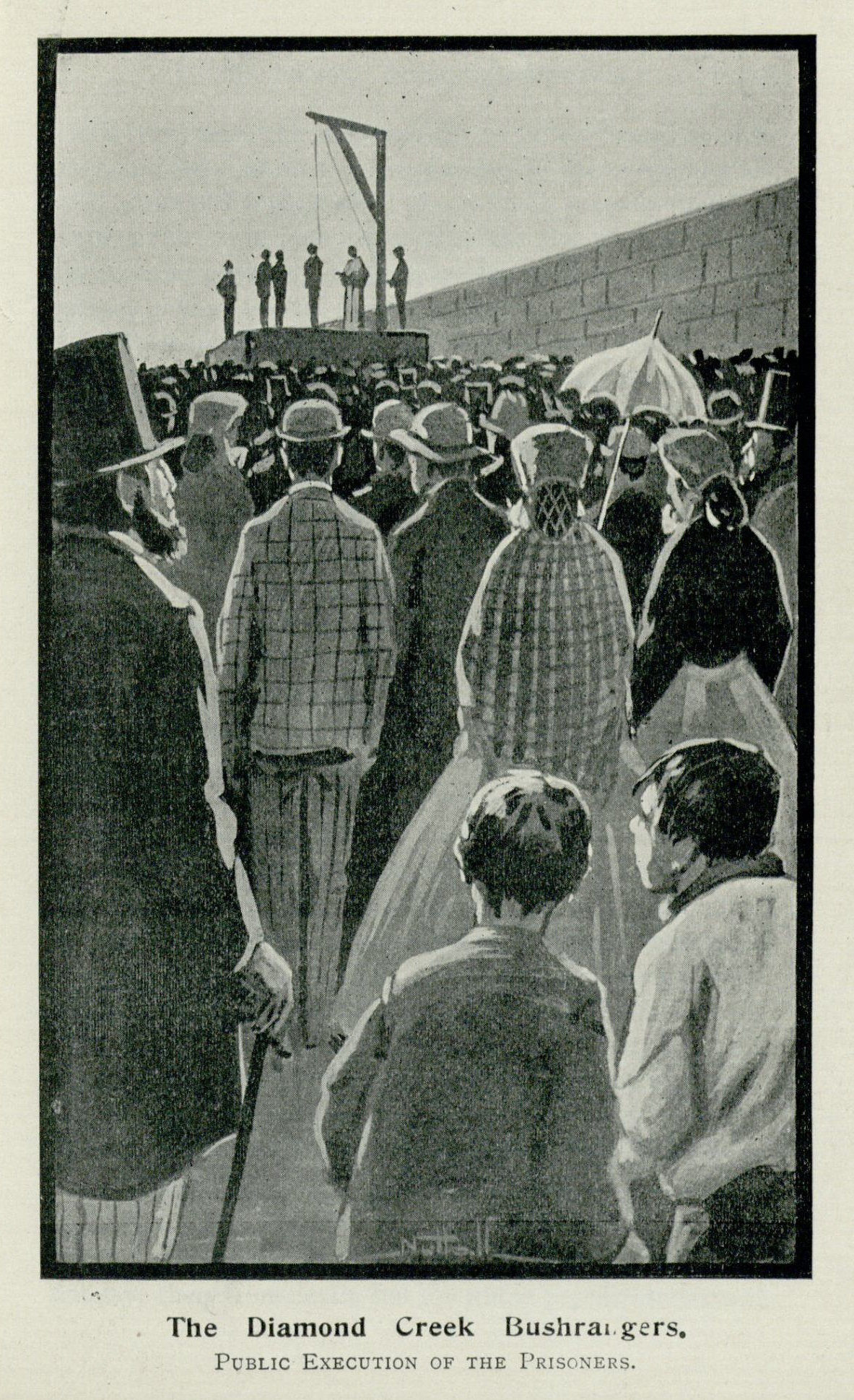
'The Diamond Creek Bushrangers: Public Execution of the Prisoners', from Tales of Old Times: Early Australian Incident and Adventure by C. H. Chomley (1903).

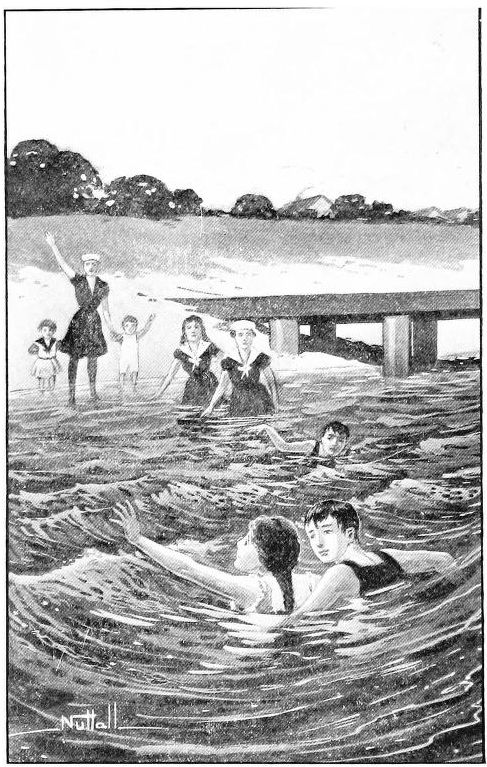
'He had only gone a few strokes when Bert appeared with Nellie under his arm', Bobbsey Twins at the Seashore (frontispiece), Grosset & Dunlap, 1907.

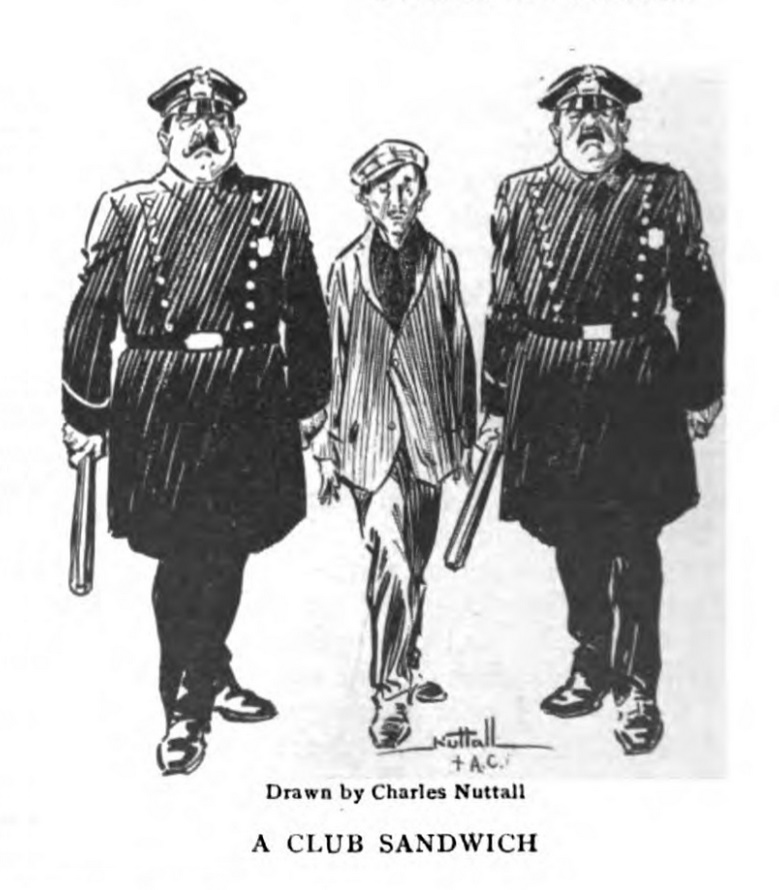
'A Club Sandwich', published in The Century Magazine, June 1910.

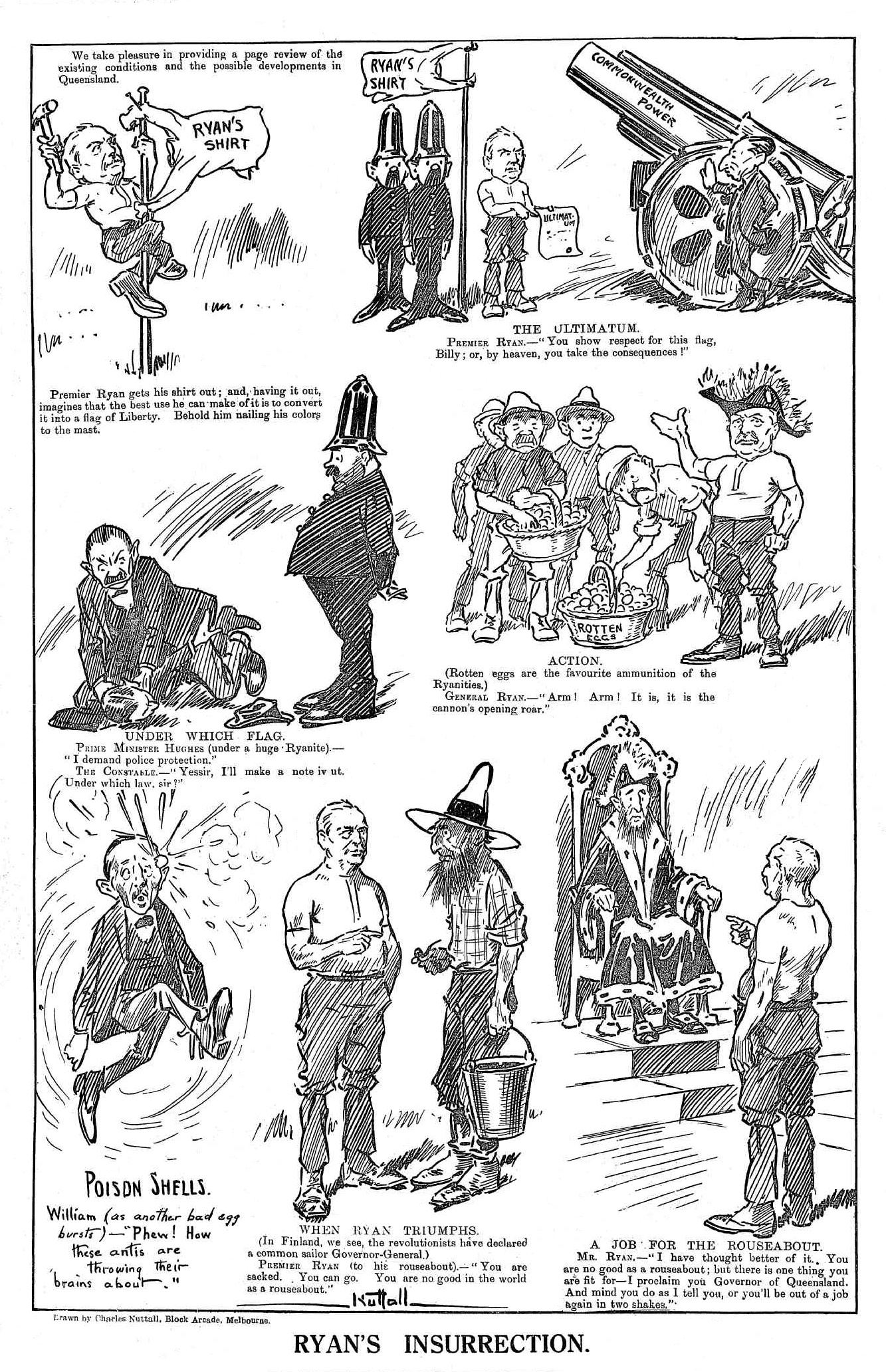
'Ryan's Insurrection' featuring caricatures of Queensland premier T. J. Ryan and prime minister Billy Hughes (Melbourne's Punch, 6 December 1917).

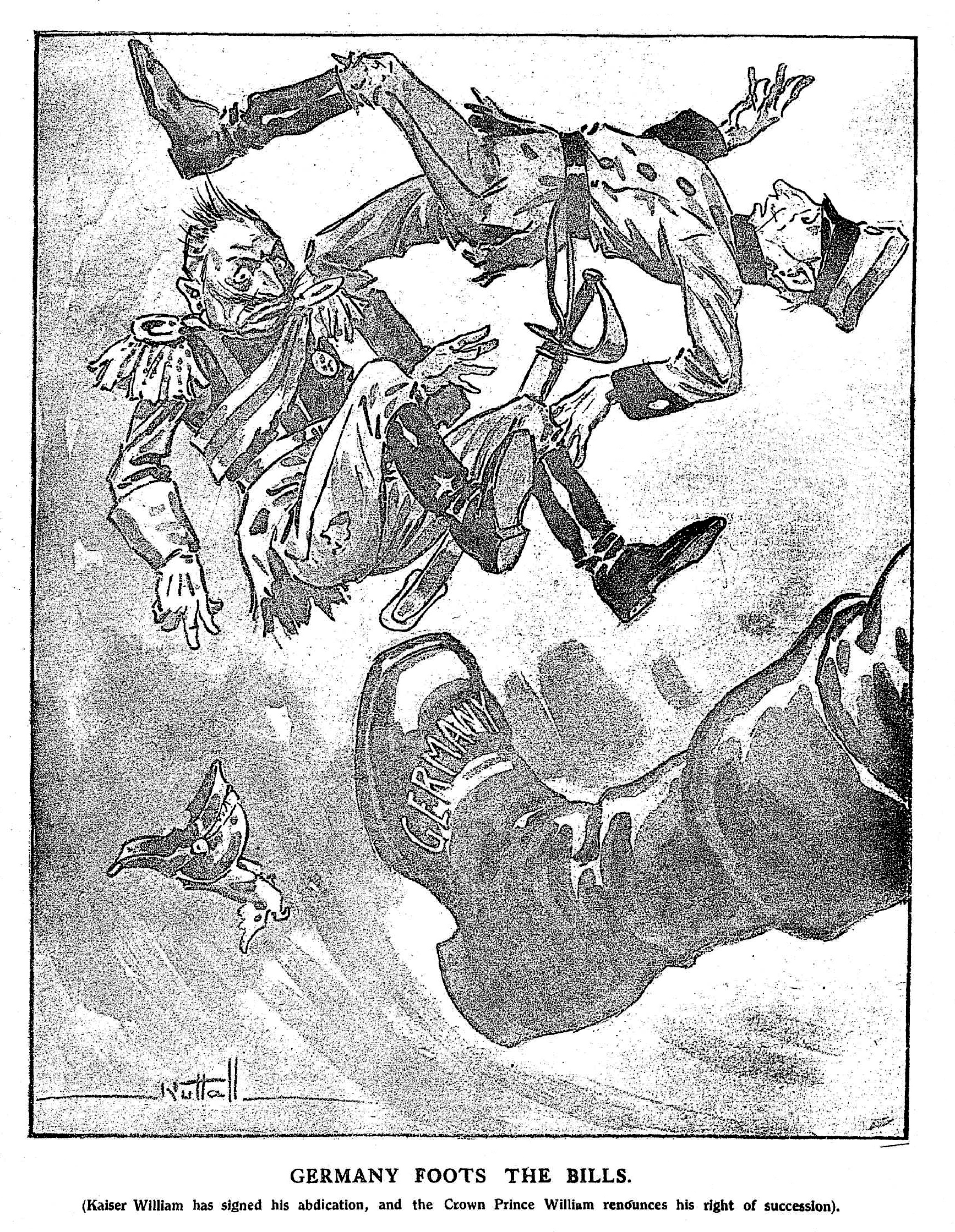
'Germany Foots the Bills' on the subject of the defeat of Germany in World War I and the abdication of Wilhelm II, published in Punch (Melbourne), 14 November 1918.

== Publications ==
- Charles Nuttall (1902), Representative Australians: A Series of Portraits from Original Sketches by Charles Nuttall, Melbourne: McCarron, Bird & Co.
- Charles Nuttall (1903), Peter Wayback Visits the Melbourne Cup: Fifteen Humourous Sketches by Charles Nuttall, Melbourne : Edgerton & Moore.
- Charles Nuttall (1910), The British Lion: An Australian Artist's Impressions of London, article published in Life, 1 November 1910.
- 'One Crowded Hour' (short story), written and illustrated by Charles Nuttall; published in The Weekly Times Annual (Melbourne), 30 December 1911, page 18.
- 'The Dingo' (short story), written and illustrated by Charles Nuttall; published in The Weekly Times Annual (Melbourne), 28 December 1912, page 47.
- Charles Nuttall (1927), 'White Man's Waterloo: Will the Coloured Races Eventually Gain Supremacy of the World?' (article), Muswellbrook Chronicle, 18 March 1927, pages 4, 11 (originally published in Life magazine).
- Charles Nuttall (1933), Melbourne Town: Text and Pictures, Melbourne: Peacock Bros.

== Book illustrations ==
=== Stratemeyer Syndicate ===
- Motor Boys series, Clarence Young (pseudonym), published by Cupples & Leon Co. (New York): The Motor Boys; or, Chums Through Thick and Thin (1906); The Motor Boys Overland; or, A Long Trip for Fun and Fortune (1906); The Motor Boys in Mexico; or, The Secret of the Buried City (1906); The Motor Boys Across the Plains; or, The Hermit of Lost Lake (1907); The Motor Boys Afloat; or, The Stirring Cruise of the Dartaway (1908); The Motor Boys on the Atlantic or, The Mystery of the Lighthouse (1908); The Motor Boys in Strange Waters; or, Lost in a Floating Forest (1909); The Motor Boys on the Pacific or, The Young Derelict Hunters (1909); The Motor Boys in the Clouds; or, A Trip for Fame and Fortune (1910).
- Boy Hunters series, Captain Ralph Bonehill (pseudonym), published by Cupples & Leon Co. (New York): Four Boy Hunters; or, The Outing of the Gun Club (1906); Guns and Snowshoes; or, The Winter Outing of the Young Hunters (1907); Young Hunters of the Lake; or, Out with Rod and Gun (1908).
- Great Marvel series, Roy Rockwood (pseudonym), published by Cupples & Leon Co. (New York): Through the Air to the North Pole; or, The Wonderful Cruise of the Electric Monarch (1906); Jack North's Treasure Hunt; or, Daring Adventures in South America (1907); Under the Ocean to the South Pole; or, The Strange Cruise of the Submarine Wonder (1907); Five Thousand Miles Underground; or, The Mystery of the Centre of the Earth (1908).
- Boys of Business series, Allen Chapman (pseudonym), published by Cupples & Leon Co. (New York): Two Boy Publishers; or, From Typecase to Editor's Chair (1906); Mail Order Frank; or, A Smart Boy and His Chances (1907); Bart Stirling's Road to Success; or, The Young Express Agent (1908).
- Dave Porter series, Edward Stratemeyer, published by Lothrop, Lee & Shepard Co. (Boston): Dave Porter's Return to School; or, Winning the Medal of Honor (1907); Dave Porter in the Far North; or, The Pluck of an American Schoolboy (1908); Dave Porter and His Classmates; or, For the Honor of Oak Hall (1909).
- Pan-American series, Edward Stratemeyer, published by Lothrop, Lee & Shepard Co. (Boston): Treasure Seekers of the Andes; or, American Boys in Peru (1907).
- Jack Ranger series, Clarence Young (pseudonym), published by Cupples & Leon Co. (New York): Jack Ranger's Schooldays; or, The Rivals of Washington Hall (1907); Jack Ranger's Western Trip; or, From Boarding School to Ranch and Range (1908); Jack Ranger's School Victories; or, Track, Gridiron, and Diamond (1908); Jack Ranger's Gun Club; or, From Schoolroom to Camp and Trail (1910); Jack Ranger's Ocean Cruise; or, The Wreck of the Polly Ann (1909).
- Bobbsey Twins series, Laura Lee Hope (pseudonym), published by Grosset & Dunlap (New York): The Bobbsey Twins in the Country (1907); The Bobbsey Twins at the Seashore (1907).
- Rover Boys series, Arthur M. Winfield (Edward Stratemeyer), published by Grosset & Dunlap (New York): The Rover Boys in Southern Waters; or, The Deserted Steam Yacht (1907); The Rover Boys on the Farm; or, Last Days at Putnam Hall (1908); The Rover Boys on Treasure Isle; or, The Strange Cruise of the Steam Yacht (1909); The Rover Boys at College; or, The Right Roads and the Wrong (1910).
- Edward Stratemeyer (1908), First at the North Pole; or, Two Boys in the Arctic Circle, published by Grosset & Dunlap (New York).
- Putnam Hall series, Edward Stratemeyer, published by Grosset & Dunlap (New York): The Putnam Hall Champions; or, Bound to Win Out (1908); The Putnam Hall Rebellion; or, The Rival Runaways (1908); The Putnam Hall Encampment; or, The Secret of the Old Mill (1910).
- Lakeport series, Edward Stratemeyer, published by Lothrop, Lee & Shepard Co. (Boston): The Gun Club Boys of Lakeport (1908); The Boat Club Boys of Lakeport (1908).
- Dorothy Dale series, Margaret Penrose (pseudonym), published by Cupples & Leon Co. (New York): Dorothy Dale: A Girl of Today (1908); Dorothy Dale at Glenwood School (1908); Dorothy Dale's Great Secret (1909); Dorothy Dale and Her Chums (1909); Dorothy Dale's Queer Holidays (1910).
- Darewell Chums series, Allen Chapman (pseudonym), published by Cupples & Leon Co. (New York): Frank Roscoe's Secret; or The Darewell Chums in the Woods (1908); Ned Wilding's Disappearance; or, The Darewell Chums in the City (1908); Fenn Masterson's Discovery; or The Darewell Chums on a Cruise (1909).
- Dave Fearless series, Roy Rockwood (pseudonym), published by Grosset & Dunlap (New York): Dave Fearless and the Cave of Mystery; or, Adrift on the Pacific (1908).
- Webster series, Frank V. Webster (Weldon J. Cobb), published by Cupples & Leon Co. (New York): Only a Farm Boy; or, Dan Hardy's Rise in Life (1909); The Boy From the Ranch; or, Roy Bradner's City Experiences (1909); Bob the Castaway; or, The Wreck of the Eagle (1909); The Newsboy Partners; or, Who was Dick Box? (1909); Two Boy Gold Miners; or, Lost in the Mountains (1909); Comrades of the Saddle; or, The Young Rough Riders of the Plain (1910).
- Dick Hamilton series, Howard Roger Garis, published by Grosset & Dunlap (New York): Larry Dexter's Great Search; or, The Hunt for the Missing Millionaire (1909); Dick Hamilton's Cadet Days; or, The Handicap of a Millionaire's Son (1910).
- Musket Boys series, George A. Warren (pseudonym), published by Cupples & Leon Co. (New York): The Musket Boys of Old Boston; or, The First Blow for Liberty (1909); The Musket Boys under Washington; or, The Tories of Old New York (1909); The Musket Boys on the Delaware; or, A Stirring Victory at Trenton (1910).
- Motor Girls series, Margaret Penrose (pseudonym), published by Cupples & Leon Co. (New York): The Motor Girls on a Tour (1910).
- Ralph (of the Railroad) series, Allen Chapman (pseudonym), published by Grosset & Dunlap (New York): Ralph on the Overland Express; or, The Trials and Triumphs of a Young Engineer (1910).
- College Sports series, Lester Chadwick (pseudonym), published by Cupples & Leon Co. (New York): The Rival Pitchers: A Story of College Baseball (1910); A Quarterback's Pluck: A Story of College Football (1910).

=== Other ===
- C. H. Chomley (1903), Tales of Old Times: Early Australian Incident and Adventure, Melbourne: W. T. Pater & Co., illustrated by Charles Nuttall.
- Thomas Hughes (1913), Tom Brown's Schooldays: A Tale of School Life, Melbourne: George Robertson (abridged and edited for Victorian schools by W. A. Shum; illustrated by Charles Nuttall).
- Evelyn Temple Emmett (c. 1913), Tommy's Trip to Tasmania, Hobart: H.H. Pimblett (Government Printer), illustrated by Charles Nuttall.
- Edith Willard (1915), Maxims of the Corset, Wise and Otherwise, illustrated by Charles Nuttall.
- Sir Walter Scott (1916), Kenilworth, Melbourne: A.H. Massina and Macmillan (abridged and edited for schools; four illustrations by Charles Nuttall).
- J. Fenimore Cooper (1916), The Last of the Mohicans: A Narrative of 1757, Melbourne: Macmillan (abridged and edited for schools; four illustrations by Charles Nuttall).
- R. M. Ballantyne, The Coral Island, Melbourne: George Robertson (abridged and edited for Victorian schools by Dugald McLachlan; illustrated by Charles Nuttall).

== Notes ==
A.Nuttall's image was one of eight medallion portraits bordering Percival Lindsay's 1906 illustration 'Smoke Night, Victorian Artists' Society 1906'.

B.Nuttall's original painting of the opening of the first federal parliament was acquired by the trustees of Melbourne's Exhibition Building. In September 1991 the ownership of the painting was transferred from the Royal Exhibition Building trustees to Museums Victoria (as part of their Royal Exhibition Building collection). The painting was exhibited in the Royal Exhibition Building in 2001 to celebrate the centenary of Federation.

C.From about July 1903 Abraham S. Gordon, trading as the Historical Picture Association of Australia, began to write to local councils and travelled extensively in an effort to sell framed prints of Nuttall's painting of the opening of the first federal parliament, to be hung in public buildings, schools, places of business and private homes. His method of dealing was to collect five shilling subscriptions as a down-payment for pictures to be supplied at a later date. In August 1908 Gordon was taken to court on an unsatisfied judgement summons and the evidence brought forth indicated he had collected about seven hundred pounds in Victoria and South Australia without having supplied any of the promised framed prints. By 1910 Gordon was travelling in Western Australia taking money for promised prints, but attracting press attention to his activities. Kalgoorlie's The Sun newspaper commented that "this particular operator seems to trade as much on the gullibility of his victims as on his appeal to patriotism and Australian national sentiment". The same article reported that prints of Nuttall's painting "had slumped from two guineas to five bob [in Queensland], and there is little market for them at that, even in the second-hand dealers' shops". In November 1912 Gordon's wife Lizzie, living in St. Kilda with two children, initiated proceedings against her husband "for leaving her without adequate means of support".

D.During the period when he lived in America Nuttall continued to contribute illustrated articles to the Australian edition of Life about his observations of New York City (for example 'When the Crowd Goes Home' in the September 1908 edition).
