= Stratemeyer =

Stratemeyer may refer to:

- Edward Stratemeyer (1862–1930), American publisher and writer of children's fiction
  - Stratemeyer Syndicate, producer of a number of children's mystery series
- George E. Stratemeyer (1890–1969), United States Army Air Forces general
