= Clarence Young =

American novelist

Clarence Young was a house pseudonym used by the Stratemeyer Syndicate for series of books for boys, the most well-known being the "Motor Boys" series.

The following series were published under the name Clarence Young:

- Jack Ranger—6 volumes (1907–1911)
- Motor Boys—22 volumes (1906–1924)--The first ten were illustrated by Charles Nuttall—Volumes 1, 2, and 8 ghostwritten by Howard R. Garis
- Racer Boys—6 volumes (1912–1914)

The pseudonym "Clarence Young" was also used by Edward Stratemeyer for a few football stories published in turn of the century boys magazines.
