= Chester K. Steele =

American novelist

Chester K. Steele was a house pseudonym used by the Stratemeyer Syndicate for a series of mystery books.

These were aimed at an older audience than most of the other syndicate books.

The first title, The Mansion of Mystery, was written by Edward Stratemeyer, and the rest were ghostwritten.

== Chester K. Steele Books ==
- The Mansion of Mystery (1911)
- The Diamond Cross Mystery (1918)
- The Golf Course Mystery (1919)
- The Crime at Red Towers (1927)
- The House of Disappearances (1927)
- The Great Radio Mystery (1928)
