= Baseball Joe =

Fictional character

Baseball Joe is the fictional hero of a number of children's books written by Howard R. Garis under the name of "Lester Chadwick". The series follows the main character, a star baseball player named Joe Matson, from high school to college (at Yale University) and then to success as a professional.

The "Baseball Joe" series was produced by the Stratemeyer Syndicate and published by Cupples & Leon. Some sources credit Edward Stratemeyer with writing unspecified books in the series Another source cites John W. Duffield as the author of the last nine books in the series.

== Character career ==
Joe Matson began playing baseball when he was just a kid. From then on, baseball was all he cared about. During various school teams he was on, rival players were sore at him but they never gave him any real trouble until he got to high school and college. They tried various things, such as kidnapping and framing. However, the "villains" are usually found out. Meanwhile, his mother wanted Joe to go to college, so he went on to Yale. However, "Momsey" really wanted Joe to be a pastor, but in truth Joe only went to Yale for baseball. He was picked up by a scout and made it to the minors, and after just one year was sent to the majors. Even though rivals still attempted to "lay him up," and they were almost never found out or arrested. When Joe found out who was causing him trouble, he gave them a good thrashing. He eventually became a great pitcher and hitter, as well as the captain of the New York Giants, who are now the San Francisco Giants. [cite]

== Personal life ==
Baseball Joe has one sister, Clara. She falls in love and eventually marries Jim, Joe's best friend. Baseball Joe's mother, who he calls Momsey, wishes Joe had higher hopes than just playing baseball, but she changes her mind after she finds out how well paid Joe is. Joe's father is an inventor of farming machinery. Joe himself is married to Mabel.

== The Baseball Joe Series ==
1. Baseball Joe of the Silver Stars, or The Rivals of Riverside - 1912
2. Baseball Joe on the School Nine, or Pitching for the Blue Banner - 1912
3. Baseball Joe at Yale, or Pitching for the College Championship - 1913
4. Baseball Joe in the Central League, or Making Good as a Professional Pitcher - 1914
5. Baseball Joe in the Big League, or A Young Pitcher's Hardest Struggles - 1915
6. Baseball Joe on the Giants, or Making Good as a Ball Twirler in the Metropolis - 1916
7. Baseball Joe in the World Series, or Pitching for the Championship - 1917
8. Baseball Joe Around the World, or Pitching on a Grand Tour - 1918
9. Baseball Joe, Home Run King, or The Greatest Pitcher and Batter on Record - 1922
10. Baseball Joe Saving the League, or Breaking Up a Great Conspiracy - 1923
11. Baseball Joe Captain of the Team, or Bitter Struggles on the Diamond - 1924
12. Baseball Joe Champion of the League, or The Record that was Worth While - 1925
13. Baseball Joe Club Owner, or Putting the Home Town on the Map - 1926
14. Baseball Joe Pitching Wizard, or Triumphs Off and On the Diamond - 1928
