= Motor Boys =

Front cover of Motor Boys Afloat, 1908 edition.

The Motor Boys were the heroes of a popular series of adventure books for boys at the turn of the 20th century issued by the Stratemeyer Syndicate under the pseudonym of Clarence Young. This series was published by Cupples & Leon and was issued with dustjackets and glossy frontispiece. Howard Garis (author of the Uncle Wiggily stories) wrote many, if not all, of these stories.

== Illustrators ==
- Charles Nuttall - Volumes 1-9
- R. Richards - Volumes 10-15
- Walter S. Rogers - Volumes 16,17,22
- R. Emmett Owen - Volumes 18-21

== The Motor Boys ==
- Bob Baker, son of a rich banker.
- Ned Slade, son of the proprietor of a large department store.
- Jerry Hopkins, son of a well–to–do widow.

== List of titles ==
1. The Motor Boys or, Chums Through Thick and Thin - 1906
2. The Motor Boys Overland or, A Long Trip for Fun and Fortune - 1906
3. The Motor Boys in Mexico or, The Secret of the Buried City - 1906
4. The Motor Boys across the Plains or, The Hermit of Lost Lake - 1907
5. The Motor Boys Afloat or, The Stirring Cruise of the Dartaway - 1908
6. The Motor Boys on the Atlantic or, The Mystery of the Lighthouse - 1908
7. The Motor Boys in Strange Waters or, Lost in a Floating Forest - 1909
8. The Motor Boys on the Pacific or, The Young Derelict Hunters - 1909
9. The Motor Boys in the Clouds or, A Trip for Fame and Fortune - 1910
10. The Motor Boys over the Rockies or, A Mystery of the Air - 1911
11. The Motor Boys over the Ocean or, A Marvelous Rescue in Mid-Air - 1911
12. The Motor Boys on the Wing or, Seeking the Airship Treasure - 1912
13. The Motor Boys after a Fortune or, The Hut on Snake Island - 1912
14. The Motor Boys on the Border or, Sixty Nuggets of Gold - 1913
15. The Motor Boys under the Sea or, From Airship to Submarine - 1914
16. The Motor Boys on Road and River or, Racing to Save a Life - 1915
17. Ned, Bob and Jerry at Boxwood Hall or, The Motor Boys as Freshman - 1916
18. Ned, Bob and Jerry on a Ranch or, The Motor Boys among the Cowboys - 1917
19. Ned, Bob and Jerry in the Army or, The Motor Boys as Volunteers - 1918
20. Ned, Bob and Jerry on the Firing Line or, The Motor Boys Fighting for Uncle Sam - 1919
21. Ned, Bob and Jerry Bound for Home or, The Motor Boys on the Wrecked Troopship - 1920
22. The Motor Boys on Thunder Mountain or, The Treasure Chest of Blue Rock - 1924

== Note ==
The name of the Motor Boys' boat, Dartaway, is also the name of the plane mentioned in The Rover Boys in the Air (1912).
