= Andrew E. Svenson =

American novelist (1910–1975)

Andrew Edward Svenson (May 8, 1910 – August 21, 1975) was an American children's author, publisher, and partner in the Stratemeyer Syndicate. Under a variety of pseudonyms, many shared with other authors, he wrote and cowrote more than 70 books for children, including in the Hardy Boys, Bobbsey Twins, Tom Swift, and Honey Bunch series. He wrote the series The Happy Hollisters using the pseudonym Jerry West and The Tolliver Family as Alan Stone.

== Early life ==
Svenson was born on May 8, 1910, in Belleville, New Jersey to parents Sven Andrew Svenson and Laura (Soleau) Svenson. He was the oldest of three children. His younger brother Arthur grew up to become a professor of business management at New York University, and his younger sister Marjorie became a Registered Nurse.

The family moved to Newark, New Jersey, where Svenson attended Barringer High School. He competed as a sprinter in high school, and later in college.

== College ==
Svenson began to study engineering at Carnegie Institute of Technology (now Carnegie Mellon University), before transferring to the University of Pittsburgh where he focused on his writing, and graduated in 1932.

== Marriage ==
Svenson met his wife while attending college. Marian Stewart was the adopted daughter of wealthy parents; the young couple eloped in 1932.

== Early career ==
Svenson began his career as a copy boy at the Newark Evening News, where he stayed until 1948. He later became a writer and was given his column about pet care and health. During World War II, he was promoted to the War Desk and was the overnight editor for its Sunday Edition. At the News, Svenson became a very close friend of writer Howard R. Garis, author of the Uncle Wiggily children's book series.

== Stratemeyer Syndicate ==
Garis introduced Svenson to Stratemeyer Syndicate partner Harriet Adams in 1947. Svenson began at the Syndicate as a ghostwriter in 1948. By his death in 1975, he had become a full partner in the Syndicate and had shaped the course of multiple children's book series during three challenging decades.

Svenson began by writing Hardy Boys volumes #’s 28, 29, and 30, based on outlines by Harriet Adams. His first Hardy Boys book was “The Sign of the Crooked Arrow," published in 1949. He quickly advanced to work on other series, and on all aspects of production — providing plot outlines, writing complete manuscripts, editing, and rewriting works produced by other Syndicate authors. By 1961, Svenson had become such a key component to the ongoing success of the Syndicate, that he was made a full partner.

In addition to The Hardy Boys, Svenson wrote 20 volumes of The Bobbsey Twins, as well as volumes for Honey Bunch and Norman.

Svenson originated and wrote three children's book series, The Happy Hollisters, The Tolliver Family, and Brett King. The Tolliver Family was the first series about African-American children. The Happy Hollisters series was based on Svenson's own family. After his death, the Stratemeyer Syndicate assigned the rights to The Happy Hollisters to his widow, Marian Svenson. Following her death the series was owned by The Hollister Family Properties Trust.

=== Hardy Boys ===
Svenson's best-known contribution to children's literature is the Hardy Boys series. The series was originally started by Harriet Adams’ father in 1927 and was written by several ghostwriters until 1948. The early books written in the 1920s and 1930s reflected the social era in which they were created; by today's standards, they have many racial stereotypes. The books also portrayed police officers in a less than flattering light, and the brothers themselves were somewhat rebellious against authority.

The Hardy Boys began to evolve in the late 1940s. Adams chose Svenson for this series based on his family life, and his contributions to the community; she wanted an author who could create more modern, wholesome Hardy Boys. Previously rebellious, the Hardy Boys would be adventurous yet respectful, resourceful, and accomplished.

The Hardy Boys evolved again, beginning in 1959. Many readers had complained about racial stereotypes in the older volumes, and under pressure from the publishing company, Harriet Adams agreed to a massive re-writing project to update the series. Svenson oversaw the project, eventually re-writing some of his early books. The new books were shorter, free of negative racial stereotypes, and included more action and exotic locations. Svenson continued his mission to engage and teach children with his stories. He continued to write Hardy Boys books until his death in 1975.

== Death ==
A resident of West Caldwell, New Jersey, Svenson died of cancer at Saint Barnabas Medical Center (Livingston, New Jersey) in 1975. He was 65 years old.

== Sources ==
- http://www.TheHappyHollisters.com
- https://web.archive.org/web/20191104074639/http://www.keeline.com/Hardy_Boys.pdf,
- “Girl Sleuth: Nancy Drew and The Women Who Created Her” by Melanie Rehak.
- Interview with Jane (Svenson) Kossmann, June 24, 2009.
- http://www.lib.usm.edu/legacy/degrum/public_html/html/research/findaids/DG0959f.html (Andrew Svenson papers at the University of Southern Mississippi
- https://web.archive.org/web/20090118022928/http://happy-hollisters.com/memoriesofandrew.html (Happy Hollisters.com)
- http://www.fantasticfiction.co.uk/s/andrew-e-svenson/
- https://web.archive.org/web/20091025064209/http://www.win.net/bayport/canon.html
- https://web.archive.org/web/20150413025234/http://stratemeyer.org/BobbseyWriters.html
- bbc.co.uk
