= Laura Lee Hope =

House pseudonym used by the Stratemeyer Syndicate

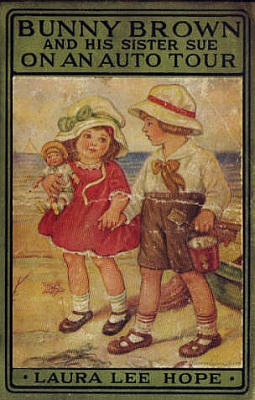
Cover of Bunny Brown and His Sister Sue on an Auto Tour

Laura Lee Hope is a pseudonym used by the Stratemeyer Syndicate for the Bobbsey Twins and several other series of children's novels. Actual writers taking up the pen of Laura Lee Hope include Edward Stratemeyer, Howard and Lilian Garis, Elizabeth Ward, Harriet (Stratemeyer) Adams, Andrew E. Svenson, June M. Dunn, Grace Grote and Nancy Axelrad.

Laura Lee Hope was first used as a pseudonym in 1904 for the debut of the Bobbsey Twins.

== Series ==
- The Bobbsey Twins (1904–1979)
- The Outdoor Girls (23 vols. 1913–1933)
- The Moving Picture Girls (7 vols. 1914–1916)
- Bunny Brown (20 vols. 1916–1931)
- Six Little Bunkers (14 vols. 1918–1930)
- Make Believe Stories (12 vols. c. 1920–1923)
- Blythe Girls (12 vols. 1925–1932)
