= The Colonial Series =

Book series by Edward Stratemeyer

The Colonial Series is a series of books written by Edward Stratemeyer from 1901 to 1906.

== Summary ==
The Colonial Series books are historical fiction that are set in the colonial period of the United States. It follows the story of a young man, David Morris, through a number of conflicts, starting with the French and Indian War.

== Historical accuracy ==
Stratemeyer consulted many reliable sources, including the writings of George Washington, in the preparation of this work.

== Books in the series ==
The series consists of six books. The series commences at the beginning of the French and Indian War and ends prior to the American Revolution.

1. With Washington in the West
2. Marching on Niagara
3. At the Fall of Montreal
4. On the Trail of Pontiac
5. The fort in the Wilderness
6. Trail and Trading-Post

=== With Washington in the West ===
Washington in the West tells something of George Washington’s youthful experience as a surveyor and his leadership of colonial forces in the French and Indian War. The hero, David Morris, is several years younger than Washington, with whom he becomes intimately associated. The book covers the adventures of David Morris in battles of the early French and Indian War, as well as in general pioneer life and his time surveying with Washington. The story relates the battles of Great Meadows and Braddock's defeat.
