= The Happy Hollisters =

Children's book series by Andrew E. Svenson

The Happy Hollisters is a book series about a family who loves to solve mysteries. The series was published by the Stratemeyer Syndicate and written entirely by Andrew E. Svenson (1910–1975) under the pseudonym Jerry West. Helen S. Hamilton (1921–2014) illustrated the books.

== Description ==
This series recounts the adventures of a young American middle-class family solving mysteries from their home on Pine Lake, in the city of Shoreham (The Hollisters' state is not known). The Hollister family includes five children, their parents, a family of cats, a dog, and a burro. Pete, the oldest of the Hollister children, is 12 years old. Pam, or Pamela, is 10 years old and very adventurous. Ricky is a red-headed, rambunctious 7-year-old, and Holly is a 6-year-old tomboy. The youngest is Sue, age 4.

Their father, Mr. John Hollister, owns a general store named The Trading Post, where he sells hardware, sporting goods, and toys. Mrs. Elaine Hollister tries to help her children solve mysteries and is always ready with handy tips for solving cases.

Joey Brill and Will Wilson appear as rivals of the Hollister family's in most books. While not actually villains, they appear as obstacles and annoyances to the Hollisters' mystery-solving efforts in most plots. Usually, Joey and Will's disruptive actions are shown to be the result of a lack of awareness, apathy, or indifference, rather than malicious motives.

== List of titles ==
- # 1 The Happy Hollisters
- # 2 The Happy Hollisters on a River Trip
- # 3 The Happy Hollisters at Sea Gull Beach
- # 4 The Happy Hollisters and the Indian Treasure
- # 5 The Happy Hollisters at Mystery Mountain
- # 6 The Happy Hollisters at Snowflake Camp
- # 7 The Happy Hollisters and the Trading Post Mystery
- # 8 The Happy Hollisters at Circus Island
- # 9 The Happy Hollisters and the Secret Fort
- #10 The Happy Hollisters at the Merry-Go-Round Mystery*
- #11 The Happy Hollisters and Pony Hill Farm*
- #12 The Happy Hollisters and the Old Clipper Ship
- #13 The Happy Hollisters at Lizard Cove
- #14 The Happy Hollisters and the Scarecrow Mystery
- #15 The Happy Hollisters and the Mystery of the Totem Faces
- #16 The Happy Hollisters and the Ice Carnival Mystery
- #17 The Happy Hollisters and the Mystery in Skyscraper City
- #18 The Happy Hollisters and the Mystery of the Little Mermaid
- #19 The Happy Hollisters and the Mystery at Missile Town
- #20 The Happy Hollisters and the Cowboy Mystery
- #21 The Happy Hollisters and the Haunted House Mystery
- #22 The Happy Hollisters and the Secret of the Lucky Coins
- #23 The Happy Hollisters and the Castle Rock Mystery
- #24 The Happy Hollisters and the Cuckoo Clock Mystery
- #25 The Happy Hollisters and the Swiss Echo Mystery
- #26 The Happy Hollisters and the Sea Turtle Mystery
- #27 The Happy Hollisters and the Punch and Judy Mystery
- #28 The Happy Hollisters and the Whistle Pig Mystery
- #29 The Happy Hollisters and the Ghost Horse Mystery
- #30 The Happy Hollisters and the Mystery of the Golden Witch
- #31 The Happy Hollisters and the Mystery of the Mexican Idol
- #32 The Happy Hollisters and the Monster Mystery
- #33 The Happy Hollisters and the Mystery of the Midnight Trolls
- * Numbers 10 and 11 have also been published as 11 and 10. Pony Hill Farm clearly references their prior mystery about the Merry-Go-Round, so Pony Hill Farm is definitely #11.

== Publishing history ==
The series was published between 1953 and 1970. Volumes 1-4 were published by Doubleday. Volumes 5-19 were published by Garden City, a Doubleday imprint. Volumes 20-33 were published by Doubleday. All subsequent reprints during this time period were done by Doubleday. New books were also made available as part of a subscription series with prices ranging from $1.00 to $1.50 per title.

The series was translated into over ten languages worldwide. English publication was discontinued at the end of 1983, but since 2010 it has been reissued in both trade paperback and eBook formats.

== Influences ==
This series is unique in that many of the characters are based on real-life entities, such as Svenson's family from Bloomfield, New Jersey. In the series, Pete represents Svenson's real-life son Andrew Jr., Pam represents his daughter Laura, Ricky represents Eric, Holly represents Jane, and Sue is a composite of Svenson's two youngest daughters, Eileen and Ingrid. Even the dog and cat have real-life counterparts: "White Nose" is really the family cat, Mickey, and the collie "Zip" is the real-life Border Collie Lassie.

Joey Brill is based on a real person as well, although everyone claims to have forgotten his real name.

Jane (Svenson) Kossmann recounts that her father placed other real characters in this series, including her social studies teacher, Mrs. Farber. She also relates that some of the stories in the books are based on stories from her Girl Scout Camp and her brother's Boy Scout Camp escapades.

== Writing and editing ==
Svenson had his children, and later his grandchildren, review and "edit" his books. Jane remembers getting to the end of a chapter in an early rough draft of one book and realizing she could not read on since the book was unfinished. After begging her father to tell her how the book ended, she was irritated by his response: that he didn't know how it ended since he hadn't written it yet!

Jane also recalls that while her friends at school knew The Happy Hollisters were based on her family, no one thought it was "any kind of a big deal. It was just another job to them — although they thought it was strange that my father worked from home sometimes, and sometimes all night and weekend." She reports that he tended to write in concentrated sessions, sometimes for what seemed like three days straight. When he "locked himself in his office to write", no one was allowed to disturb him. She reports that he took breaks from writing to swim at the local YMCA, ride his racing bicycle, or punch a boxer's punching bag he had set up at home.

== Cultural reference ==
In the cartoon series Arthur, Arthur and Francine, in an attempt to get their friend Buster Baxter to read, suggest several simple books, including The Jolly Jollisters.

Rick Barba pays homage to The Happy Hollisters in his Spy Gear Adventures book series by naming his two neighborhood bullies "Brill Joseph" (reminiscent of Joey Brill) and "Wilson Wills" (for Will Wilson). He also has his sibling protagonists Jake and Luke Bixby utter, "Crickets!" and "Yikes!", the favorite exclamations of Pete and Ricky Hollister's, respectively.

== Translations ==
Twelve of the books have been translated into Swedish. The whole series was translated into Spanish and sold in Spain and several Latin American countries under the title "Los Hollister". The whole series was also translated into Norwegian, as Lykkebarna. At least 11 of their adventures were published in a German adaptation as Die fröhlichen Falkenbergs under the name of "Gerhart West". Eighteen of their adventures were also published in France by Hachette in its "Bibliothèque Rose" imprint under the name "Les Joyeux Jolivet".
