= Harriet Adams =

American novelist (1892–1982)

- Born: Harriet Stratemeyer; December 12, 1892; Newark, New Jersey, U.S.
- Died: March 27, 1982 (aged 89); Tewksbury Township, New Jersey, U.S.
- Occupations: Novelist, publisher
- Spouse: Russell Vroom Adams (m. 1915)
- Children: 4
- Parent(s): Edward Stratemeyer; Magdalena Van Camp
- Writing career
- Pen name: Carolyn Keene
- Genre: Young adult mystery fiction
- Notable work: Nancy Drew series

Harriet Stratemeyer Adams (December 12, 1892 – March 27, 1982) was an American juvenile book packager, children's novelist, and publisher who was responsible for some 200 books over her literary career. She wrote the plot outlines for many books in the Nancy Drew series, using characters invented by her father, Edward Stratemeyer. Adams also oversaw other ghostwriters who wrote for these and many other series as a part of the Stratemeyer Syndicate, and oversaw the rewriting of many of the novels to update them starting in the late 1950s.

== Stratemeyer Syndicate ==
With her sister, Edna, Adams took over control of the Stratemeyer Syndicate after her father Edward Stratemeyer's death in 1930. Edna ran the daily business operations, while Adams dealt with publishers and wrote; Edna became inactive when she married in 1942, and Adams took over the business. Adams is credited with keeping the Syndicate afloat through the Great Depression, and with revising the two most popular series, Nancy Drew and the Hardy Boys, in the 1950s and 1960s, removing stereotypes and streamlining plots and characters. She ran the Syndicate for 52 years.

== Role in Nancy Drew series ==
The extremely popular Nancy Drew books were the brainchild of Adams's father, who created the characters of a sixteen-year-old sleuth, her lawyer father, and their housekeeper. Later, Nancy's age was increased to eighteen to give her more independence. Adams came up with plot ideas and hired ghostwriters to flesh them out. The best-known books were written primarily by Mildred Wirt Benson, though all were published under the pseudonym Carolyn Keene. Adams outlined a few in the Hardy Boys series, which were published under the pseudonym Franklin W. Dixon. Although Adams claimed to write all the Nancy Drew books entirely by herself during her lifetime, it is well established that Wirt and 28 other authors did the actual writing, following Adams's ideas and embellishing on them. Adams touched up the completed manuscripts.

== Personal life ==
Harriet Stratemeyer was born in Newark, New Jersey, on December 12, 1892, the daughter of Edward Stratemeyer and Magdalena Van Camp. At a young age, Adams wanted to break free from being a "proper, young lady who should stay at home". She climbed trees, made friends with local boys, and loved books from an early age. Adams graduated from Wellesley College in 1914. Her father forbade her to work outside the estate, so she edited manuscripts at home. In 1915, she married Russell Vroom Adams, and raised four children, becoming involved in the family business only after her father's death. She resided in Maplewood, New Jersey, and in Pottersville, New Jersey, an area within Tewksbury Township. She lived in Pottersville at her estate, Bird Haven New Jersey and died of a heart attack while watching The Wizard of Oz for the first time.

Adams was interred in the Stratemeyer crypt in Fairmount Cemetery in Newark.
