= Cupples & Leon =

US publisher

- Founded: 1902
- Founder: Victor I. Cupples and Arthur T. Leon
- Defunct: 1956
- Successor: Platt & Munk
- Country of origin: United States
- Headquarters location: New York City
- Publication types: Books
- Fiction genres: juvenile fiction and children's books
- Official website: https://cupplesandleon.com

Cupples & Leon was an American publishing company founded in 1902 by Victor I. Cupples (1864–1941) and Arthur T. Leon (1867–1943). They published juvenile fiction and children's books but are mainly remembered today as the major publisher of books collecting comic strips during the early decades of the 20th century.

In Manhattan, the company was initially located in the Presbyterian building at 156 Fifth Avenue and, during the 1920s, at 449 Fourth Avenue.

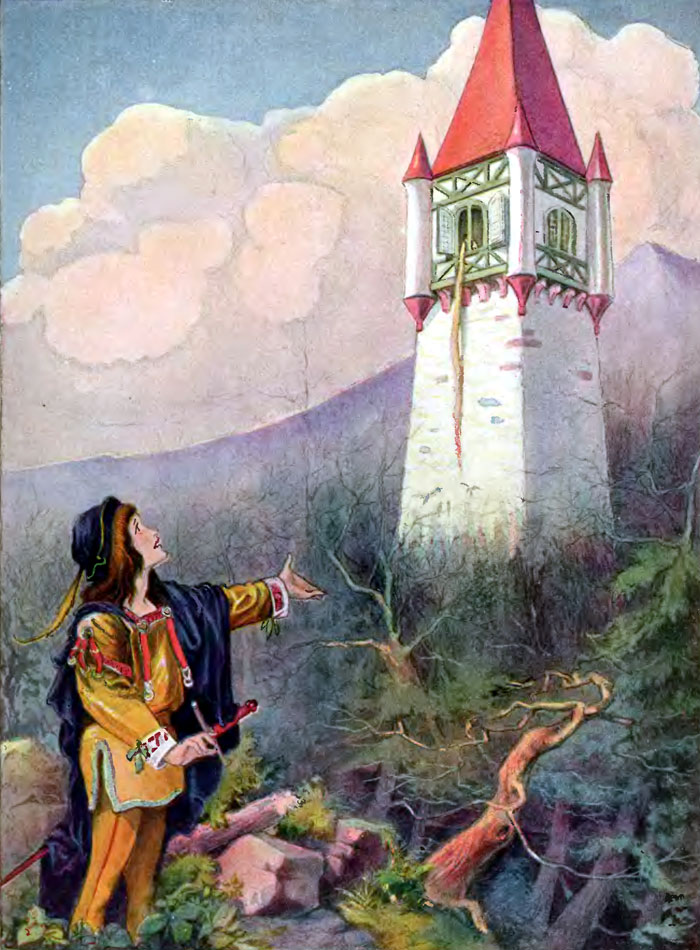
Rapunzel, from the 1914 Cupples & Leon edition of Grimm's Fairy Tales, illustrated by Johnny Gruelle.

== Juvenile adventure books ==
Victor Cupples had previously worked with the publisher Houghton Mifflin, and Arthur Leon had been with Laird & Lee Publishers. In 1902, Cupples and Leon ran the New York agency for the George W. Ogilvie Company and other Chicago firms. They also were the advertising managers for Jamieson-Higgins' Four O'Clock magazine. The duo saw that Grosset & Dunlap and A. L. Burt (New York), Donohue (Chicago) and Altemus (Philadelphia) were selling juveniles at varying prices from $1.25 to 25 cents. After talks with Edward Stratemeyer, the two men published a juvenile that sold for 50 cents but appeared to be worth more. Cupples & Leon published the American editions of the UK children's weekly story paper Chatterbox, founded by John Erskine Clarke, prompting a UK researcher of Chatterbox to comment:

The adolescent public at once decided that here was the place to get your money's worth. It did not take the other publishers long to follow Cupples' lead. Burt and Grosset, who had popular writers on their lists, rose merrily with them to opulence. Doubters like Donohue and Altemus slipped slowly but surely from the juvenile field... Cupples compiled a colossal list of children's names. Included on the jacket of each of its books was a coupon which, when filled out with the names and addresses of ten friends, entitles the whole group to Cupples illustrated catalogue. The catalogue was an insidious narcotic with the habit-forming properties of opium. In it were printed fetching bits from the more popular series. Cupples estimates that all in all 500,000 names have been on that list.

In 1913, they were publishing Roy Rockwood's Dave Dashaway series and other aviation juveniles. Scouting was another focus of their serial novels, along with their Motor Boys series. In 1914, they published Grimm's Fairy Tales, illustrated by Johnny Gruelle.

Bud Fisher's Mutt and Jeff #17 (Cupples & Leon, 1934)

== Comic strips ==
In 1903, Cupples & Leon collected such strips as The Katzenjammer Kids, Alphonse and Gaston, Happy Hooligan, On and Off the Ark, Poor Lil Mose and The Tigers. Their major competitor in books of comic strip reprints was Frederick A. Stokes, who died in 1939.

To reprint comic strips, the company offered, for 25 cents, a square-bound paperback format of 52 pages of black-and-white strips. The flexible, cardboard covers were printed in black and red. Between 1906 and 1934, Cupples & Leon published more than 100 titles in that format. They collected Bringing Up Father, Little Orphan Annie, Mutt and Jeff, Reg'lar Fellers, Smitty, Tillie the Toiler and other leading strips of the 1920s and 1930s. They produced at least 18 reprint collections of Mutt and Jeff daily strips, in 10" × 10" softcover books from 1919 to 1934. In 1921, they negotiated a contract to sell $405,000 worth of these books to magazine distributor American News Company, at the time one of the largest publishing contracts ever signed.

They also published two larger hardcover editions, Mutt and Jeff Big Book (1926) and Mutt and Jeff Big Book No. 2 (1929). They left the comic strip reprint field in 1934, concentrating on their juvenile lines, just as the modern day comic book was introduced that same year with Famous Funnies. Leon estimated the company sold more than 35,000,000 copies of its comics reprints.

Tillie the Toiler (Cupples & Leon, 1925)

== Death of founders and sale ==
Victor Cupples died in Mount Vernon, New York in July 1941. Arthur Leon, who lived in New Rochelle, New York, died in December 1943, and his wife, Louise Heroy Leon, died five years later in February 1948.

The Platt & Munk publishing firm acquired Cupples & Leon in 1956.
