= Book packaging =

Publishing activity involving outsourcing

Book packaging, or book producing, is a publishing activity in which an individual or outside company independently develops and produces a book, performing the creative and production work that is commonly handled by agents and publishing houses. Trade publishers, museums, corporations, and other organizations use the services of book packagers when they do not have the in-house resources to handle a project.

As a bridge between publishing companies and creators, packagers blend the roles of agent, editor, and publisher. They are often engaged for complex books that require specialized coordination and project teams. These include "highly illustrated, elaborately designed, or multi-authored titles, such as how-to books, coffee table books, reference books, textbooks, cookbooks, and more."

Book packaging is also common in the genre fiction market, particularly for books aimed at preteens and teenagers; series books (e.g., Nancy Drew, Sweet Valley High, Goosebumps, and the For Dummies series); and co-editions, where the original publisher licenses the book to publishers in other territorial markets and gains an immediate return on capital invested.

== Publishing model ==
The functions typically handled by book producers might include writing a proposal and pitching a project to publishers, negotiating contracts, commissioning writers, editing the manuscript, acquiring images, designing the book, copyediting, proofreading, and indexing. They often oversee prepress and printing, as well.

While book packagers handle many aspects of the publishing process—from concept through final product, depending on the arrangement—the distribution and marketing of a book are "virtually always" the responsibility of the publisher.

Sometimes a book packager will originate a concept and sell a book project to a publishing company based on a proposal. In this arrangement, the packager will develop and deliver the book to the publisher in the agreed upon form, which may be a "polished manuscript, printer-ready files, or finished books." From there, the publisher will complete the process to bring the book to market.

For some packaged books, writers will be engaged anonymously on a work for hire basis and paid a flat fee or per word rate. For example, a book project may be sold with a celebrity (or someone with a very marketable name) as the credited author, while a professional ghostwriter will be used to draft the manuscript. Sometimes writers or creators are credited as "staff writers" or under a pen name. Most book packaging companies do not pay royalties, which means that even if a ghostwriter's novel becomes a bestseller, the writer will not receive additional payment.

While the book-packaging sector is little-known outside the publishing world, it provides employment to many freelance authors, illustrators, and other creators.

== See also ==
- American Book Producers Association
- Stratemeyer Syndicate
- Alloy Entertainment
- Comics packaging
- Movie packaging
