= Stratemeyer Syndicate =

Book packager in the US responsible for many young adult series

- Founder: Edward Stratemeyer
- Country of origin: United States
- Fiction genres: Mystery and children

The Stratemeyer Syndicate was an American book packaging company that produced a number of book series for children, including Nancy Drew, The Hardy Boys, the various Tom Swift series, the Bobbsey Twins, the Rover Boys, and others. It contracted the many pseudonymous authors who wrote the series from 1899 to 1987, and arranged the publishing by firms such as Grosset & Dunlap. In 1987 it was sold to Simon & Schuster.

== History ==
Created by Edward Stratemeyer, the Stratemeyer Syndicate was the first book packager to aim its books at children rather than adults. The Syndicate was wildly successful; at one time it was believed that the overwhelming majority of books children read in the United States were Stratemeyer Syndicate books, based on a 1922 study of over 36,000 American children.

Stratemeyer's business acumen was in realizing the huge, untapped market for children's books. The Stratemeyer Syndicate specialized in producing books meant primarily to be entertaining. In Stratemeyer's view, it was the thrill of feeling grown-up and the desire for a series of stories that made such reading attractive to children. Stratemeyer believed this desire could be harnessed for profit. He founded the Stratemeyer Syndicate to produce books in an efficient, assembly-line fashion and write them so as to maximize their popularity.

The first series that Stratemeyer created was The Rover Boys, published under the pseudonym Arthur M. Winfield in 30 volumes between 1899 and 1926, which sold over five million copies. The Bobbsey Twins first appeared in 1904 under the pseudonym Laura Lee Hope, and Tom Swift in 1910 under the pseudonym Victor Appleton.

Stratemeyer published a number of books under his own name, but the books published under pseudonyms sold better. Stratemeyer realized that "he could offer more books each year if he dealt with several publishers and had the books published under a number of pseudonyms which he controlled." Stratemeyer explained his strategy to a publisher, writing that "[a] book brought out under another name would, I feel satisfied, do better than another Stratemeyer book. If this was brought out under my own name, the trade on new Stratemeyer books would simply be cut into four parts instead of three."

Some time in the first decade of the twentieth century Stratemeyer realized he could no longer juggle multiple volumes of multiple series, and he began hiring ghostwriters, such as Mildred Benson, Josephine Lawrence, Howard R. Garis and Leslie McFarlane. Stratemeyer continued to write some books, while writing plot outlines for others.

While mystery elements were occasionally present in these early series, the Syndicate later specialized in children's mystery series. This trend began in 1911, when Stratemeyer wrote and published The Mansion of Mystery under the pseudonym Chester K. Steele. Five more books were published in that mystery series, the last in 1928. These books were aimed at a somewhat older audience than his previous series. After that, the Syndicate focused on mystery series aimed at its younger base: The Hardy Boys, which first appeared in 1927, ghostwritten by Leslie McFarlane and others; and Nancy Drew, which first appeared in 1930, ghostwritten by Mildred Wirt Benson, Walter Karig, and others. Both series were immediate financial successes.

In 1930, Stratemeyer died, and the Syndicate was inherited by his two daughters, Harriet Stratemeyer Adams and Edna Stratemeyer Squier. Stratemeyer Squier sold her share to her sister Harriet within a few years. Adams introduced such series as The Dana Girls (1934), Tom Swift Jr., The Happy Hollisters, and many others. In the 1950s, Adams began substantially revising old volumes in The Hardy Boys and Nancy Drew series, updating them to remove references to outdated cultural elements, such as "roadster". Racial slurs and stereotypes were also removed, and in some cases (such as The Secret at Shadow Ranch and The Mystery at the Moss-Covered Mansion) entire plots were cast off and replaced with new ones. In part, these changes were motivated by a desire to make the books more modern. Grosset & Dunlap, the primary publisher of Stratemeyer Syndicate books, requested the books' racism be excised, a project Adams felt was unnecessary. Grosset & Dunlap held firm; it had received an increasing number of letters from parents offended by stereotypes present in the books, particularly in The Hardy Boys publications.

In the late 1970s, Adams decided it was time for Nancy and the Hardys to go into paperback, as the hardcover market was no longer what it had been. Grosset & Dunlap sued, citing "breach of contract, copyright infringement, and unfair competition". The ensuing case let the world know, for the first time, that the Syndicate existed; the Syndicate had always gone to great lengths to hide its existence from the public, and ghostwriters were contractually obliged never to reveal their authorship.

Grosset & Dunlap was awarded the rights to The Hardy Boys and Nancy Drew volumes that it had published, but the Syndicate was judged free to take subsequent volumes elsewhere. Subsequent volumes were published by Simon & Schuster.

Adams died in 1982. In 1984, Simon & Schuster purchased the syndicate from its partners — Edward Stratemeyer Adams, Camilla Adams McClave, Patricia Adams Harr, Nancy Axelrad, Lorraine Rickle, and Lilo Wuenn — and turned to Mega-Books, a book packager, to handle the writing process for new volumes.

== Writing guidelines ==
"They don't have hippies in them," [Adams] said ... "And none of the characters have love affairs or get pregnant or take dope."

All Stratemeyer Syndicate books were written under certain guidelines, based on practices Stratemeyer began with his first series, the Rover Boys.

- All books would be part of a series.
- To establish more quickly if a series was likely to be successful, the first several volumes would be published at once. These first volumes are often called "breeders".
- The books would be written under a pseudonym. This would provide apparent continuity of authorship, even when an author died, and would disguise the fact that series were written by multiple ghostwriters and plot-outliners.
- The books would look as much like contemporary adult books as possible, with similar bindings and typefaces.
- The books would be of a predictable length.
- Chapters and pages should end mid-situation, to increase the reader's desire to keep reading.
- Each book would begin with a quick recap of all previous books in that series, in order to promote those books.
- Books might also end with a preview of the next volume in the series: "Nancy ... could not help but wonder when she might encounter as strange a mystery as the recent one. Such a case was to confront her soon, The Clue of the Whistling Bagpipes".
- The books would be priced at 50 cents, rather than the more common 75 cents, $1.00, or $1.25.
- Certain tropes and narrative elements were disallowed. Leslie McFarlane, for example, was required to revise two of his Hardy Boys characters, Chief Collig and Deputy Smuff, because their portrayal as incompetent police officers "fostered a disrespect for authority." Characters also could not age or marry: protagonists of early series such as the Rover Boys, Tom Swift, and Ruth Fielding grew up and married, and sales dropped afterward, prompting this rule.

== Criticism ==
For decades, many libraries refused to carry Syndicate books, considering them unworthy trash. Series books were considered to "cause 'mental laziness,' induce a 'fatal sluggishness,' and 'intellectual torpor.'" Series books were considered to ruin a child's chances for gaining an appreciation of good literature (which was subsequently shown by one study not to be the case), and to undermine respect for authority: "Much of the contempt for social conventions ... is due to the reading of this poisonous sort of fiction."

Franklin K. Mathiews, chief librarian for the Boy Scouts of America, wrote that series books were a method, according to the title of one of his articles, for "Blowing Out the Boys' Brains", and psychologist G. Stanley Hall articulated one of the most common concerns by asserting that series books would ruin girls in particular by giving them "false views of [life] ... which will cloud her life with discontent in the future".

None of this hurt sales and Stratemeyer was unperturbed, even when his books were banned from the Newark Public Library as early as 1901, writing to a publisher: "Personally it does not matter much to me. ... Taking them out of the Library has more than tripled the sales in Newark."

== Foreign publications ==
Some syndicate series were also reprinted in foreign countries. An early foreign version was a Ted Scott Flying Stories book, published in Germany in 1930 as Ted Scott Der Ozeanflieger. The artwork was generally changed when reprinted in other countries, and sometimes character names and other details were as well. For example, in Norway, translations of the Nancy Drew books were first published in 1941, the first European market to introduce the girl detective. “The translators changed the color of Nancy's car, shortened the text, and made the language easier to read; but they made no substantive changes” to the stories. By the 1970s, Nancy Drew stories had “been translated into Spanish, Swedish, French, German, Dutch, Italian, Danish, Finnish, Norwegian, and Icelandic.

Other series reprinted outside the States include The Dana Girls, The Hardy Boys and the Bobbsey Twins (in Australia, France, Sweden, and the UK). These other series first appeared around the 1950s outside the United States.

The second Stratemeyer Syndicate series to be reprinted outside the United States appears to have been the first two books in the Don Sturdy series, although exact dates of printing are unknown. Those were The Desert of Mystery and The Big Snake Hunters. There are two British versions known of the latter book; both were printed by The Children's Press, one in the 1930s and the second, with different cover art, in the 1950s.

== See also ==
- List of Stratemeyer Syndicate series
