= Edward Stratemeyer =

American book packager, publisher and writer (1862–1930)

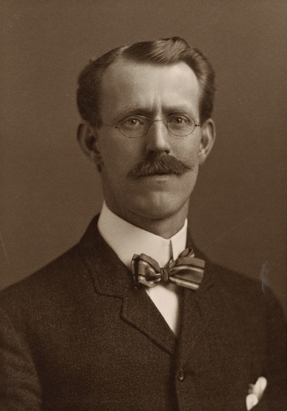
- Born: October 4, 1862; Elizabeth, New Jersey, U.S.
- Died: May 10, 1930 (aged 67); Newark, New Jersey, U.S.
- Occupations: Publisher, writer
- Spouse: Magdalena Van Camp (m. 1891)
- Children: 2, including Harriet Adams
- Writing career
- Pen name: Victor Appleton, Ralph Bonehill, Franklin W. Dixon, Laura Lee Hope, Carolyn Keene, Roy Rockwood and Arthur M. Winfield
- Genres: Adventure, mystery, science fiction
- Notable works: Creator of the book series: • The Bobbsey Twins • Bomba, the Jungle Boy • The Colonial Series • The Dana Girls • Dave Dashaway • Don Sturdy • The Hardy Boys • Jack Ranger • Nancy Drew • The Rover Boys • Tom Swift

Edward Stratemeyer (/ˈstrætəˌmaɪər/) (October 4, 1862 – May 10, 1930) was an American publisher, writer of children's fiction and founder of the Stratemeyer Syndicate.

Stratemeyer created many well-known children's fiction book series, including The Rover Boys, The Bobbsey Twins, Tom Swift, The Hardy Boys, and Nancy Drew, many of which sold millions of copies and remain in publication. On his legacy, Fortune wrote: "As oil had its Rockefeller, literature had its Stratemeyer."

== Early life ==
Stratemeyer was born the youngest of three children in Elizabeth, New Jersey, to tobacconist Henry Julius Stratemeyer and Anna Siegel. They were both from Hanover, Germany, immigrating to the United States in 1837. Anna was first married to Henry's younger brother George Stratemeyer, with whom she had three sons. Following George's death in a cholera outbreak, she married Henry.

The Stratemeyer children were educated in English and spoke it to each other. In his childhood, Stratemeyer read the works of Horatio Alger and William T. Adams, writers who penned rags-to-riches tales of the hardworking young American, which greatly influenced him. He also listened to stories from his father, a former miner in the 1849 California gold rush.

As a teenager, Stratemeyer operated his own printing press in the basement of his father's tobacco shop, distributing flyers and pamphlets among his friends and family. His first story paper was Our American Boys which he published in January 1883. After he graduated from high school, he went to work in his father's store. At the age of 26, he sold his first story, Victor Horton's Idea, to the children's magazine Golden Days for $76, over six times the average 1888 weekly paycheck.

== Career ==
Stratemeyer moved to Newark, New Jersey, in 1890 and opened a paper store. He ran his shop while continuing to write stories under pseudonyms. He was able to write for many genres including detective dime novels, westerns and serials that ran in newspapers. Many of his Westerns included elements from his father's stories, such as the description of Sutter's Mill given to him by his father.

Stratemeyer wrote 59 dime novels between 1892 and 1897. From 1893 to 1895, Stratemeyer was the editor for the Street & Smith boys' story paper Good News.

In 1894, he published his first full-length book, Richard Dare's Venture, which was the first in his Bound to Succeed series. It contained autobiographical content and was similar to Alger's rags-to-riches story formula. He published a romance in the New York Weekly in 1895, writing as Edna Winfield.

He published two historical novels in 1898 as Captain Ralph Bonehill.

Stratemeyer wrote and published the first book in The Rover Boys series in 1899, which became a tremendously popular series in the vein of the classic dime novel. The Rover Boys were published under his pseudonym Arthur M. Winfield. Each volume had a preface from Stratemeyer, thanking his readers and touting the other books. He said this series was his personal favorite.

Stratemeyer formed the Stratemeyer Syndicate in 1905 and hired writers to write stories based on his ideas. He paid them a flat rate for each book and kept the copyrights to the novels.

== Personal life ==
Stratemeyer married Magdalena Van Camp, the daughter of a Newark businessman, on March 25, 1891. The couple had two daughters: Harriet Stratemeyer Adams (1892–1982) and Edna C. Squier (1895–1974), both of whom would take over the Stratemeyer Syndicate after his death.

Stratemeyer enjoyed the outdoors and often took annual summer trips to the Great Lakes, Lake George and Lake Champlain with his family. They traveled as far as the west coast and Yosemite. A humble man, he never sought public attention and preferred living a private and quiet life with his family at their home on N. 7th Street in the Roseville section of Newark. His relationships with his daughters were warm and Harriet recalled a lively atmosphere growing up.

Stratemeyer was a member of the Roseville Athletic Club and the New Jersey Historical Association.

Stratemeyer died at age 67 in Newark, New Jersey on May 10, 1930, of lobar pneumonia and was buried in Evergreen Cemetery in Hillside, New Jersey. On May 12, 1930, two days after his death, the New York Times reported that his Rover Boys series "had sales exceeding 5,000,000 copies".

== Accomplishments ==
Stratemeyer was listed in the first edition of Who's Who in America in 1899.

Stratemeyer pioneered the book-packaging technique of producing a consistent, long-running series of books using a team of freelance writers. All of the books in the series used the same characters in similar situations. All of the freelance writers, including Mildred Wirt, who developed the character of Nancy Drew, were published under a pen name owned by his company. Most of the work was done through correspondence, as writers like Wirt lived far away.

Through his Stratemeyer Syndicate, founded in 1906, Stratemeyer employed a massive number of editors, copy writers, stenographers, cowriters and secretaries. They greatly contributed to a new genre of juvenile fiction and helped launch several series, including

- (1899) The Rover Boys
- (1904) The Bobbsey Twins
- (1905) Dave Porter
- (1910) Tom Swift
- (1912) Baseball Joe
- (1927) The Hardy Boys
- (1930) Nancy Drew
- (1934) The Dana Girls

== Fictional depictions ==
A fictionalized version of Stratemeyer appears in the television series The Young Indiana Jones Chronicles, portrayed by character actor Lee Lively. In the series, Stratemeyer is the father of the fictional Nancy Stratemeyer, who dates Indiana Jones in high school. Indiana is a fan of Tom Swift and gives Stratemeyer advice for one of his stories.

== See also ==
- List of children's literature authors
- List of people from New Jersey
- List of people from New York City
- List of publishers
