= List of Tom Swift books =

All books in the various Tom Swift book series. All books are credited to the pseudonym Victor Appleton (or, in the case of the Tom Swift Jr. series, Victor Appleton II), while the character was created by Edward Stratemeyer for his book packaging house, the Stratemeyer Syndicate. Counterparts to the Tom Swift character and series are later Stratemeyer creations, The Hardy Boys and Nancy Drew, the former of which Swift crossed over with in the fourth series.

== The original Tom Swift series ==
The first novels to feature the Tom Swift character were released in 1910 by Grosset & Dunlap. The series was created by Edward Stratemeyer, and written by several ghostwriters in its duration.

The first 38 titles were published by Grosset & Dunlap, with two ghostwriters: Howard Garis wrote the first thirty-five titles, while Harriet Adams wrote the final three. Two more titles were published as a part of the Big Little Book series (by rival Western Publishing), and were ghostwritten by Thomas Moyston Mitchell.

Title, authorship, publication date, and source text (when available)
#	Title	Public domain source	Pub.	Ghostwriter
1	Tom Swift and His Motor Cycle; Or, Fun and Adventure on the Road	Wikisource; Project Gutenberg	1910	Howard Garis
2	Tom Swift and His Motor Boat; Or, The Rivals of Lake Carlopa	Wikisource; Project Gutenberg	1910	Howard Garis
3	Tom Swift and His Airship; Or, The Stirring Cruise of the Red Cloud	Wikisource; Project Gutenberg	1910	Howard Garis
4	Tom Swift and His Submarine Boat; Or, Under the Ocean for Sunken Treasure	Wikisource; Project Gutenberg	1910	Howard Garis
5	Tom Swift and His Electric Runabout; Or, The Speediest Car on the Road	Wikisource; Project Gutenberg	1910	Howard Garis
6	Tom Swift and His Wireless Message; Or, The Castaways of Earthquake Island	Wikisource; Project Gutenberg	1911	Howard Garis
7	Tom Swift Among the Diamond Makers; Or, The Secret of Phantom Mountain	Wikisource; Project Gutenberg	1911	Howard Garis
8	Tom Swift in the Caves of Ice; Or, The Wreck of the Airship	Wikisource; Project Gutenberg	1911	Howard Garis
9	Tom Swift and His Sky Racer; Or, The Quickest Flight on Record	Wikisource; Project Gutenberg	1911	Howard Garis
10	Tom Swift and His Electric Rifle; Or, Daring Adventures on Elephant Island	Wikisource; Project Gutenberg	1911	Howard Garis
11	Tom Swift in the City of Gold; Or, Marvelous Adventures Underground	Wikisource; Project Gutenberg	1912	Howard Garis
12	Tom Swift and His Air Glider; Or, Seeking the Platinum Treasure	Wikisource; Project Gutenberg	1912	Howard Garis
13	Tom Swift in Captivity; Or, A Daring Escape by Airship	Wikisource; Project Gutenberg	1912	Howard Garis
14	Tom Swift and His Wizard Camera; Or, Thrilling Adventures While Taking Moving Pictures	Wikisource; Project Gutenberg	1912	Howard Garis
15	Tom Swift and His Great Searchlight; Or, On the Border for Uncle Sam	Wikisource; Project Gutenberg	1912	Howard Garis
16	Tom Swift and His Giant Cannon; Or, The Longest Shots on Record	Wikisource; Project Gutenberg	1913	Howard Garis
17	Tom Swift and His Photo Telephone; Or, The Picture That Saved a Fortune	Wikisource; Project Gutenberg	1914	Howard Garis
18	Tom Swift and His Aerial Warship; Or, The Naval Terror of the Seas	Project Gutenberg	1915	Howard Garis
19	Tom Swift and His Big Tunnel; Or, The Hidden City of the Andes	Project Gutenberg	1916	Howard Garis
20	Tom Swift in the Land of Wonders; Or, The Underground Search for the Idol of Gold	Project Gutenberg	1917	Howard Garis
21	Tom Swift and His War Tank; Or, Doing His Bit for Uncle Sam	Project Gutenberg	1918	Howard Garis
22	Tom Swift and His Air Scout; Or, Uncle Sam's Mastery of the Sky	Project Gutenberg	1919	Howard Garis
23	Tom Swift and His Undersea Search; Or, The Treasure on the Floor of the Atlantic	Project Gutenberg	1920	Howard Garis
24	Tom Swift Among the Fire Fighters; Or, Battling with Flames in the Air	Project Gutenberg	1921	Howard Garis
25	Tom Swift and His Electric Locomotive; Or, Two Miles a Minute on the Rails	Project Gutenberg	1922	Howard Garis
26	Tom Swift and His Flying Boat; Or, Castaways of the Giant Iceberg	Project Gutenberg; Faded Page	1923	Howard Garis
27	Tom Swift and His Great Oil Gusher; Or, The Treasure of Goby Farm	Project Gutenberg; Faded Page	1924	Howard Garis
28	Tom Swift and His Chest of Secrets; Or, Tracing the Stolen Inventions	Project Gutenberg; Faded Page	1925	Howard Garis
29	Tom Swift and His Airline Express; Or, From Ocean to Ocean by Daylight	Project Gutenberg; Faded Page	1926	Howard Garis
30	Tom Swift Circling the Globe; Or, The Daring Cruise of the Air Monarch	Project Gutenberg; Faded Page	1927	Howard Garis
31	Tom Swift and His Talking Pictures; Or, The Greatest Invention on Record	Project Gutenberg; Faded Page	1928	Howard Garis
32	Tom Swift and His House on Wheels; Or, A Trip around the Mountain of Mystery	Project Gutenberg; Faded Page	1929	Howard Garis
33	Tom Swift and His Big Dirigible; Or, Adventures Over the Forest of Fire	Project Gutenberg	1930	Howard Garis
34	Tom Swift and His Sky Train; Or, Overland Through the Clouds		1931	Howard Garis
35	Tom Swift and His Giant Magnet; Or, Bringing Up the Lost Submarine		1932	Howard Garis
36	Tom Swift and His Television Detector; Or, Trailing the Secret Plotters		1933	Harriet Adams
37	Tom Swift and His Ocean Airport; Or, Foiling the Haargolanders		1934	Harriet Adams
38	Tom Swift and His Planet Stone; Or, Discovering the Secret of Another World		1935	Harriet Adams
39	Tom Swift and His Giant Telescope (Note: This title was published by Better Little Book.)	Wikisource; Project Gutenberg	1939	Thomas Moyston Mitchell
40	Tom Swift and His Magnetic Silencer		1941	Thomas Moyston Mitchell

== Tom Swift Jr. ==
Officially titled Tom Swift Jr., the second series was published by Grosset & Dunlap from 1954 to 1971. Tom Swift and the Visitor from Planet X and Tom Swift and the Electronic Hydrolung are in the public domain, and are available as downloadable texts from Project Gutenberg.

Titles, authorship, and publication dates
#	Title	Pub.	Ghostwriter
1	Tom Swift and His Flying Lab	1954	William Dougherty
2	Tom Swift and His Jetmarine	1954	John Almquist
3	Tom Swift and His Rocket Ship	1954	John Almquist
4	Tom Swift and His Giant Robot	1954	Richard Sklar
5	Tom Swift and His Atomic Earth Blaster	1954	James Duncan Lawrence
6	Tom Swift and His Outpost in Space	1955	James Duncan Lawrence
7	Tom Swift and His Diving Seacopter	1956	James Duncan Lawrence
8	Tom Swift in the Caves of Nuclear Fire	1956	Thomas Mulvey
9	Tom Swift on the Phantom Satellite	1956	James Duncan Lawrence
10	Tom Swift and His Ultrasonic Cycloplane	1957	James Duncan Lawrence
11	Tom Swift and His Deep-Sea Hydrodome	1958	James Duncan Lawrence
12	Tom Swift in the Race to the Moon	1958	James Duncan Lawrence
13	Tom Swift and His Space Solartron	1958	James Duncan Lawrence
14	Tom Swift and His Electronic Retroscope	1959	James Duncan Lawrence
15	Tom Swift and His Spectromarine Selector	1960	James Duncan Lawrence
16	Tom Swift and the Cosmic Astronauts	1960	James Duncan Lawrence
17	Tom Swift and the Visitor from Planet X	1961	James Duncan Lawrence
18	Tom Swift and the Electronic Hydrolung	1961	James Duncan Lawrence
19	Tom Swift and His Triphibian Atomicar	1962	James Duncan Lawrence
20	Tom Swift and His Megascope Space Prober	1962	James Duncan Lawrence
21	Tom Swift and the Asteroid Pirates	1963	James Duncan Lawrence
22	Tom Swift and His Repelatron Skyway	1963	James Duncan Lawrence
23	Tom Swift and His Aquatomic Tracker	1964	James Duncan Lawrence
24	Tom Swift and His 3-D Telejector	1964	James Duncan Lawrence
25	Tom Swift and His Polar-Ray Dynasphere	1965	James Duncan Lawrence
26	Tom Swift and His Sonic Boom Trap	1965	James Duncan Lawrence
27	Tom Swift and His Subocean Geotron	1966	James Duncan Lawrence
28	Tom Swift and the Mystery Comet	1966	James Duncan Lawrence
29	Tom Swift and the Captive Planetoid	1967	James Duncan Lawrence
30	Tom Swift and His G-Force Inverter	1968	Thomas Mulvey
31	Tom Swift and His Dyna-4 Capsule	1969	Richard McKenna
32	Tom Swift and His Cosmotron Express	1970	Richard McKenna
33	Tom Swift and the Galaxy Ghosts	1971	Vincent Buranelli

== Tom Swift (1981) ==
The third Tom Swift series was launched following the Stratemeyer Syndicate moving publishers to Simon & Schuster. The series was published under the publisher's Wanderer imprint (as were the Nancy Drew and Hardy Boys books at the time), and lasted from 1981 to 1984. This series took place in outer space and featured fan-favorite character Aristotle the Robot, who was introduced in the second volume.

The series was cancelled in 1984, when Simon & Schuster bought the Syndicate. Two titles — Chaos on Earth and The Micro World — were written by Neal Barrett, but not published before its cancellation. The manuscripts of the two titles are in the Syndicate's archives, which are held at the New York Public Library.

Titles, authorship, and publication dates
#	Title	Pub.	Ghostwriter
1	The City in the Stars	1981	William Rotsler & Sharmon Divono
2	Terror on the Moons of Jupiter	1981	William Rotsler & Sharmon Divono
3	The Alien Probe	1981	William Rotsler & Sharmon Divono
4	The War in Outer Space	1981	William Rotsler & Sharmon Divono
5	The Astral Fortress	1981	William Rotsler & Sharmon Divono
6	The Rescue Mission	1982	William Rotsler & Sharmon Divono
7	Ark Two	1982	Neal Barrett, Jr.
8	Crater of Mystery	1983	Mike McQuay
9	Gateway to Doom	1983	Bob Vardeman
10	The Invisible Force	1983	Neal Barrett, Jr.
11	Planet of Nightmares	1984	Mike MacQuay

== Tom Swift (1991) ==
The fourth Tom Swift series was created as a counterpart to The Nancy Drew Files and The Hardy Boys Casefiles spin-offs, and was published by Archway from 1991 to 1993. The series had two books which crossed over with the Hardy Boys, a sub-series titled Hardy Boys and Tom Swift Ultra Thrillers — Time Bomb (August 1992) and The Alien Factor (June 1993).

Titles, authorship, and publication dates
#	Title	Pub.	Ghostwriter
1	The Black Dragon	April 1991	Bill McCay
2	The Negative Zone	April 1991	Bill McCay
3	Cyborg Kickboxer	June 1991	Steven Grant
4	The DNA Disaster	August 1991	F. Gwynplaine MacIntrye
5	Monster Machine	October 1991	Debra Doyle & James D. Macdonald
6	Aquatech Warriors	December 1991	Debra Doyle & James D. Macdonald
7	Moonstalker	February 1992	
8	The Microbots	April 1992	Robert E. Vardeman
9	Fire Biker	June 1992	
10	Mind Games	October 1992	Bruce Holland Rogers
11	Mutant Beach	December 1992	Robert E. Vardeman
12	Death Quake	February 1993	Bridget McKenna
13	Quantum Force	April 1993	

== Tom Swift: Young Inventor ==
The fifth series to feature the Tom Swift character was published by Aladdin from 2006 to 2007. The series served as a counterpart to Nancy Drew: Girl Detective and The Hardy Boys: Undercover Brothers series, both of which were reboots of their original series. Like its counterparts, a big part of the reboot was that titles were now written in first-person narration.

The series was cancelled in late 2007, while its counterparts were rebooted into trilogies. A seventh title, Extraterrestrial Highway, was planned for publication in February 2008; however, it ultimately remained unpublished. There are ISBN's registered for volumes 8-11 in this series, but the titles and status of the manuscripts are unknown.

Titles and publication dates
#	Title	Released	Ghostwriter
1	Into the Abyss	June 1, 2006	
2	The Robot Olympics	June 1, 2006	Greg Cox
3	The Space Hotel	October 10, 2006	
4	Rocket Racers	January 23, 2007	
5	On Top of the World	May 22, 2007	
6	Under the Radar	October 2, 2007	

== Tom Swift Inventors' Academy ==
The sixth series to feature the Tom Swift character was launched by Aladdin in July 2019. It features a young Swift, age is around thirteen, who attends a school for young inventors and scientists. This series, a counterpart to the Hardy Boys Adventures and Nancy Drew Diaries series, is told in first-person narration, and published in eBook, paperback, and hardcover. Audiobooks of the first five titles released on CD narrated by Timothy Andres Pabon. A boxed set of the first four paperbacks was also published using cover art from the first book.

Titles and publication dates
#	Title	Released	Ghostwriter
1	The Drone Pursuit	July 2, 2019	Michael Anthony Steele
2	The Sonic Breach	July 2, 2019	Michael Anthony Steele
3	Restricted Access	October 22, 2019	Michael Anthony Steele
4	The Virtual Vandal	March 17, 2020	Michael Anthony Steele
5	The Spybot Invasion	July 28, 2020	Michael Anthony Steele
6	Augmented Reality	March 16, 2021	Michael Anthony Steele
7	The Blurred Blogger	June 15, 2021	Michael Anthony Steele
8	Depth Perception	March 15, 2022	Michael Anthony Steele
