= Tom Swift and His Electric Rifle =

Young adult novel in the "Tom Swift" series of the early 1900's

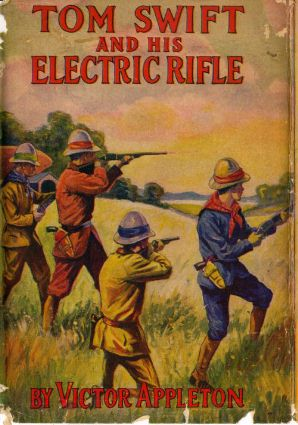
- Author: Victor Appleton
- Original title: Tom Swift and His Electric Rifle, or, Daring Adventures in Elephant Land
- Language: English
- Series: Tom Swift
- Genre: Young adult novel; Adventure novel
- Publisher: Grosset & Dunlap
- Publication date: 1911
- Publication place: United States
- Media type: Print (hardback & paperback)
- Pages: 200+ pp
- Preceded by: Tom Swift and His Sky Racer
- Followed by: Tom Swift in the City of Gold
- Text: Tom Swift and His Electric Rifle at Wikisource

Tom Swift and His Electric Rifle; or, Daring Adventures in Elephant Land is a young adult novel published in 1911, written by Stratemeyer Syndicate writers using the pen name Victor Appleton. It is Volume 10 in the original Tom Swift novel series published by Grosset & Dunlap. The novel is notable for inspiring the name of the Taser.

== Plot ==
While Tom Swift is working on his latest new invention, the electric rifle, he meets an African safari master whose stories of elephant hunting sends the group off to deepest, darkest Africa. Hunting for ivory is the least of their worries, as they find out some old friends are being held hostage by the fearsome tribes of the red pygmies.

Swift builds two major inventions in this volume. The first is a replacement airship, known as The Black Hawk. This new airship is to replace The Red Cloud, which was destroyed during his adventures in Tom Swift in the Caves of Ice. This airship is of the same general construction as The Red Cloud, but is smaller and more maneuverable.

Of foremost notice is Swift's invention of the electric rifle, a gun which fires bolts of electricity. The electric rifle can be calibrated to different levels of range, intensity, and lethality; it can shoot through solid walls without leaving a hole, and is powerful enough to kill a rampaging whale, as in their steamer trek to Africa. With the electric rifle, Tom and friends bring down elephants, rhinoceroses, and buffalo, and save their lives several times in pitched battle with the red pygmies. It also can discharge a globe of light that was described as being able to maintain itself, like ball lightning, making hunting at night much safer in the dark of Africa. In appearance, the rifle looked very much like contemporary conventional rifles.

== Racist content ==
The Thomas Swift series included racist depictions of its non-white characters:

In the book, the black people are rendered as either passive, simple and childlike, or animalistic and capable of unimaginable violence. They are described in the book at various points as “hideous in their savagery, wearing only the loin cloth, and with their kinky hair stuck full of sticks”, and as “wild, savage and ferocious ... like little red apes."

— Jamiles Lartey

== Homages ==
Sixty years later a non-lethal weapon delivering an electric shock was developed by Jack Cover and marketed by Taser International under the name "Taser", an acronym for Thomas A. Swift's Electric Rifle. The middle initial 'A' is used to produce a word more pronounceable than "TSER", as no other name than "Tom Swift" is used for the book's hero.

== See also ==
- Tom Swift
- List of Tom Swift books
