= Tom Swift and His Undersea Search =

1920 novel by Victor Appleton

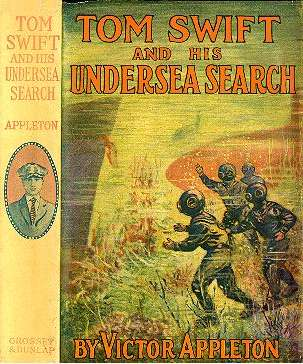
- Author: Victor Appleton
- Original title: Tom Swift and His Undersea Search, or, The Treasure on the Floor of the Atlantic
- Language: English
- Series: Tom Swift
- Genre: Young adult novel Adventure novel
- Publisher: Grosset & Dunlap
- Publication date: 1920
- Publication place: United States
- Media type: Print (Hardback & Paperback)
- Pages: 200+ pp
- Preceded by: Tom Swift and His Air Scout
- Followed by: Tom Swift Among the Fire Fighters

Tom Swift and His Undersea Search, Or, The Treasure on the Floor of the Atlantic, is Volume 23 in the original Tom Swift novel series published by Grosset & Dunlap by Victor Appleton

== Plot summary ==
A Mr. Dixwell Hardley approaches Tom with a proposition to help recover sunken treasure. Mr. Hardley was on board a ship which was carrying gold to help finance an illegal revolution. When the ship sank, Mr. Hardley overheard the captain recording the coordinates. Now he wants Tom's help to recover the gold, under the guise of both financing the expedition as well as rewarding Tom with a portion of the recovered treasure.

Unfortunately for Tom, after agreeing to the expedition, he learns that Mr. Hardley is a con-artist, who recently scammed someone out of the oil well rights. Making matters worse, the victim is Barton Keith, a relative of Mary Nestor. Rather than cancel the expedition, Tom decides to carry on in the hopes of restoring Mr. Keith's claims to the oil wells.

== Inventions & Innovation ==
Invention is almost irrelevant to this story. Tom retrofits his submarine, which he built in Volume #4, Tom Swift and His Submarine Boat. The redesign makes use of electric- and gasoline-powered engines. The hull is doubly strengthened, as the sunken ship is at a greater depth. An exterior version of the great searchlight is affixed to the newly remodeled submarine; and finally, newly strengthened diving suits and a special type of diving bell have been built for the expedition.

== In popular culture ==
In the episode entitled "Home" of the HBO TV series Boardwalk Empire, the character Jimmy Darmody is given a copy of Tom Swift and His Undersea Search by a fellow veteran Richard Harrow.
