= Tom Swift and His War Tank =

Book by Victor Appleton

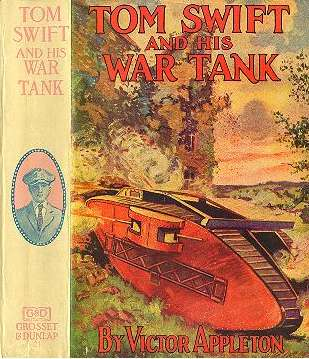
- Author: Victor Appleton
- Original title: Tom Swift and His War Tank, Or, Doing His Bit for Uncle Sam
- Language: English
- Series: Tom Swift
- Genre: Young adult novel Adventure novel
- Publisher: Grosset & Dunlap
- Publication date: 1918
- Publication place: United States
- Media type: Print (Hardback & Paperback)
- Pages: 200+ pp
- Preceded by: Tom Swift in the Land of Wonders
- Followed by: Tom Swift and His Air Scout

Tom Swift and His War Tank, Or, Doing His Bit for Uncle Sam, is Volume 21 in the original Tom Swift novel series published by Grosset & Dunlap and written by Victor Appleton.

== Plot summary ==
When the United States joins in The Great War, it seems that everyone has war fever. A military base close to Shopton is training soldiers in the art of trench warfare, while pilots are learning aerial combat. Ned Newton has quit his job to sell liberty bonds full-time. Many of the young men have enlisted, or even hoping for the draft. Everyone seems to be doing their bit, except for Tom Swift, which raises many concerns that Tom is a slacker.

Tom does not let his country down; the reason he appears to be idle is that he has secretly been developing a new tank for use in combat. The project is so secret that Tom does not even let his close friends know, which causes the concerns being raised about Tom's patriotism. Even though the development is in secret, that does not stop German nationals from trying to steal his tank.

== Inventions & Innovation ==
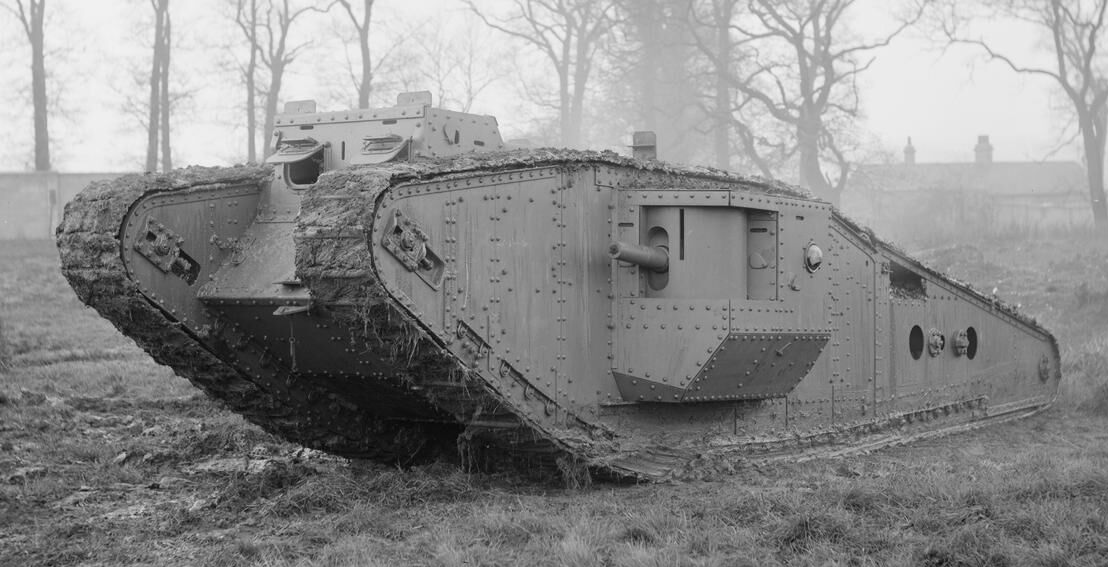
Image of a British tank used in World War I

Tanks are a new wartime technology, and the British Army has deployed them for use on the western front. Tom's tank is bigger, and able to travel at twice the speed of current models, with a max of 12 miles per hour (19 km/h). At the expense of limited firepower with four unspecified machine guns, the tank has heavier armor plating than the British tanks.

Tom further refines the tank with an innovative built-in bridging mechanism, which will allow the tank to roll over wider trenches than the existing models.

== See also ==
- Tom Swift and His Electric Rifle – Young adult novel in the "Tom Swift" series of the early 1900's
