= Tom Swift and His Big Tunnel =

1916 novel by Victor Appleton

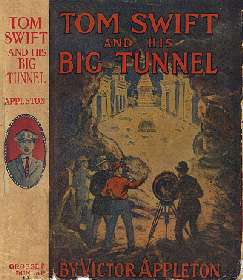
- Author: Victor Appleton
- Original title: Tom Swift and His Big Tunnel, or, the Hidden City of the Andes
- Language: English
- Series: Tom Swift
- Genre: Young adult novel Adventure novel
- Publisher: Grosset & Dunlap
- Publication date: 1916
- Publication place: United States
- Media type: Print (Hardback & Paperback)
- Pages: 200+ pp
- ISBN: 978-1515136699
- Preceded by: Tom Swift and His Aerial Warship
- Followed by: Tom Swift in the Land of Wonders

Tom Swift and His Big Tunnel, or, the Hidden City of the Andes, is Volume 19 in the original Tom Swift novel series published by Grosset & Dunlap.

== Plot summary ==
The Titus Brothers Contractors company have won a government contract in Peru to blast a tunnel through a mountain and connect two isolated railroad lines. The deadline is approaching, and the contractors have hit a literal wall: excessively hard rock which defies conventional blasting techniques. The company is under pressure to finish, or else the contract will default to their rivals, Blakeson & Grinder. Mr. Job Titus has heard of Tom Swift and Tom's giant cannon, which is used in protecting the Panama Canal, and wants to hire Tom to develop a special blasting powder to help them finish the excavation.

Mr. Damon, Tom's very good friend, arrives in the middle of this conversation, and is unaware of the situation. By coincidence, Mr. Damon is invested in a business which procures cinchona bark from Peru, but production has all but ceased, prompting Mr. Damon to invite Tom to accompany him to Peru and discover the source of the problem.

Tom, Mr. Damon and Mr. Titus (along with Koku, Tom's giant) embark for Peru. On the way, they encounter Professor Swyington Bumper, who is on a lifelong quest to locate the lost city of Pelone. Professor Bumper returns to Peru each season, and has thus far been unsuccessful. When Professor Bumper discovers that Tom is headed to the same general area, Rimac, Professor Bumper decides to join the company.

== Inventions and innovations ==
Early in the book, Tom is working a new gyroscope, but events soon overtake that project, and Tom puts that aside for the time being.

In Tom Swift and His Giant Cannon, Tom has developed a new propellant to launch the projectiles from his giant cannon, and when Mr. Titus requests Tom's help, Tom begins to develop a new blasting powder. Ultimately Tom finds a suitable solution which can blast through heavy rock with ease. While on the job site, several blasts into the mountain, the rock changes into an even harder substance. Tom needs to modify his formula from a "quick burn" into a "slow burn" blast; rather than blasting the rock via concussion alone, the new formula first builds high pressure in the fissures of the rock, before the concussion splits the rock.

== References in modern culture ==
In the 1990s TV series The Young Indiana Jones Chronicles, Indiana Jones is dating Tom Swift's author's daughter, and in one scene assists Mr. Stratemeyer in forwarding the plot of Tom Swift and His Big Tunnel.
