= Tom Swift and His Aerial Warship =

1915 novel by Victor Appleton

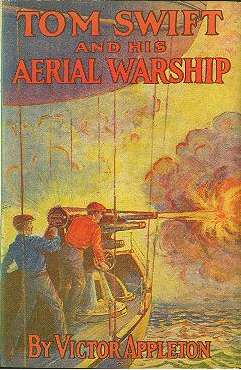
- Author: Victor Appleton
- Original title: Tom Swift and His Aerial Warship, or, The Naval Terror of the Seas
- Language: English
- Series: Tom Swift
- Genre: Young adult novel Adventure novel
- Publisher: Grosset & Dunlap
- Publication date: 1915
- Publication place: United States
- Media type: Print (Hardback & Paperback)
- Pages: 200+ pp
- Preceded by: Tom Swift and His Photo Telephone
- Followed by: Tom Swift and His Big Tunnel

Tom Swift and His Aerial Warship, or, The Naval Terror of the Seas, is Volume 18 in the original Tom Swift novel series published by Grosset & Dunlap.

== Plot summary ==
The story was written in 1915, and World War I, also known as The Great War, was already in progress. As the story opens, Tom is explaining his newest invention to his friend, Ned Newton. Just as Tom is in the middle of explaining the problems he is having, a fire erupts in one of the sheds, where explosives are stored. After the fire has been put out, careful investigation shows that the fire was set deliberately.

In preparation for presenting his new airship to the United States Government, Tom has invited a Lieutenant Marbury, from the Navy, to review his ship. Marbury informs Tom of a possible plot against Tom and his inventions, past and present. Tom scoffs at the idea, but soon finds out otherwise, as his new airship is hijacked by foreign spies with an unknown agenda.

== Inventions & Innovation ==
Tom creates two new inventions for this story: a huge airship for military use, and a method of dealing with recoil on the weapons to be used.

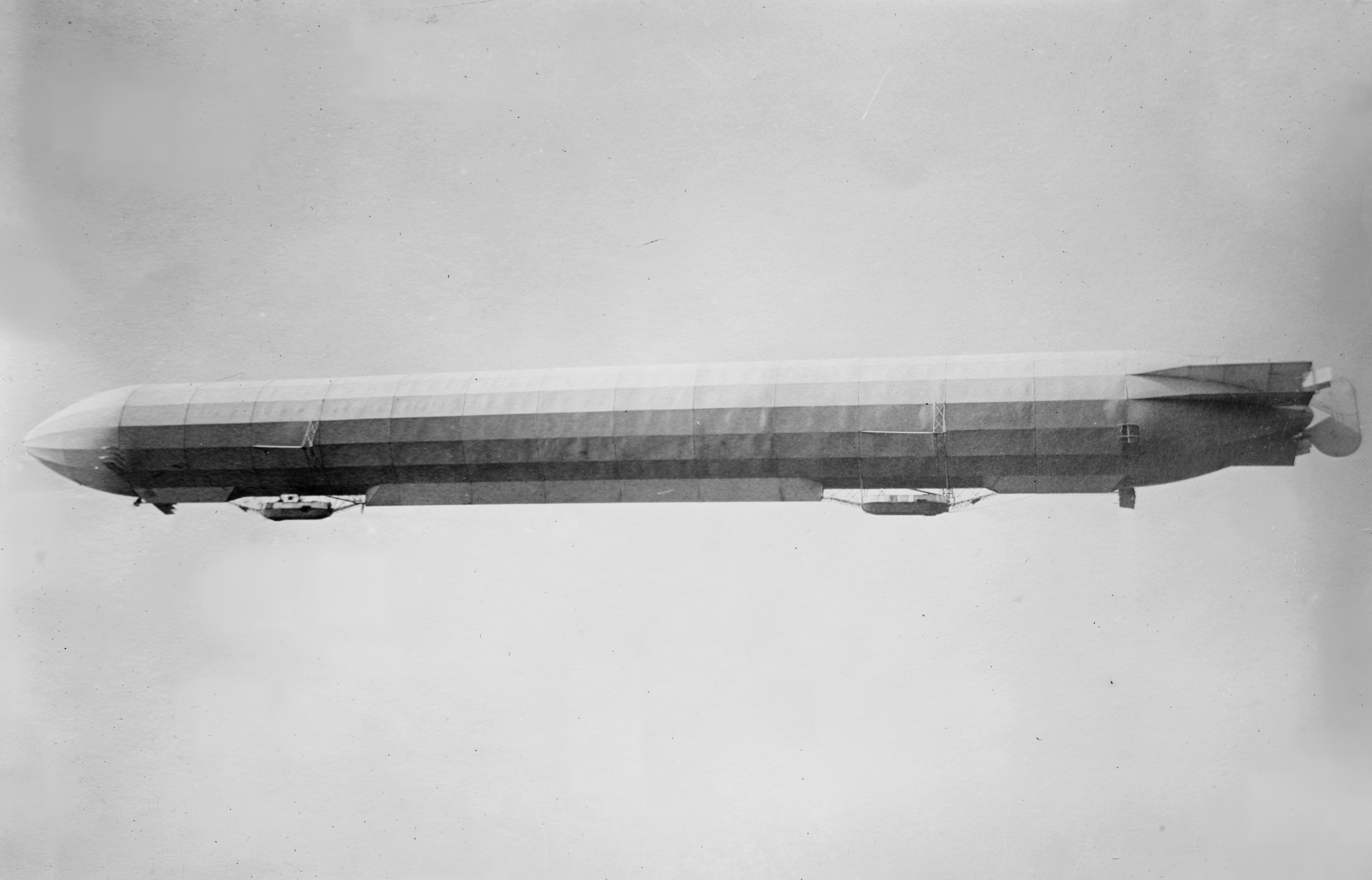
Image of a Zeppelin in flight.

The airship is built on a similar model as the German-built zeppelins. These are huge craft, Tom's measuring at 600 feet in length and 60 feet in diameter. It is built of a semi-rigid airbag with several separated gas compartments, which would permit lift even if one or more of the gas compartments was damaged. Three cabins are hung below the airship: at the front is the pilot house, in the middle is the general quarters, and at the rear is the engine. A non-flammable gas is used for lift, and a single gas-powered engine provides forward momentum. Storage batteries, coupled with an electric motor, are used as backup power in the event of main engine failure. Tom hoped to sell this to the United States government, with an eye on the hostilities occurring in Europe at the time of the story.

Secondary to the airship, Tom needs to conceive of a way to neutralize recoil from the guns which he plans to mount: two 4-inch cannon, and several unspecified machine-guns. When fired, the cannon would generate enough recoil to rip the ship apart, but Tom is inspired by Ned's observation of how an automatic door closer operates. Tom's invention is similar to the recoil system used in the French 75mm field gun.
