= Tom Swift and His Air Scout =

1919 novel by Victor Appleton

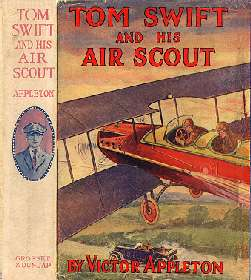
- Author: Victor Appleton
- Original title: Tom Swift and His Air Scout, or, Uncle Sam's Mastery of the Sky
- Language: English
- Series: Tom Swift
- Genre: Young adult novel Adventure novel
- Publisher: Grosset & Dunlap
- Publication date: 1919
- Publication place: United States
- Media type: Print (Hardback & Paperback)
- Pages: 200+ pp
- ISBN: 978-1515122449
- Preceded by: Tom Swift and His War Tank
- Followed by: Tom Swift and His Undersea Search

Tom Swift and His Air Scout, Or, Uncle Sam's Mastery of the Sky, is Volume 22 in the original Tom Swift novel series published by Grosset & Dunlap.

== Plot summary ==
World War I still rages on in Europe, and Tom Swift is still inventing wartime technology, but inspiration comes in the form of infatuation: while taking Mary Nestor for a brief flight, he is unable to communicate due to the noise of the engine, which sets Tom onto the track of developing a totally silent airship. While Mary Nestor was the spark, Tom intends to offer this to the United States government for use on the western front.

While this is still a germ of an idea, Tom is approached by Mr. Gale and Mr. Ware, representatives of the Universal Flying Machine Company, a competing airship manufacturer. Tom is offered a lucrative salary to join the firm, but Tom is uninterested in the money. Tom's refusal infuriates the men, and events are set in motion, which include the (accidental) kidnapping of Mr. Nestor, Mary's father.

== Inventions & Innovation ==
Tom builds a special silencer for airship engines. The silencer consists of several components: a new type of propeller, retooling the engine compression, but most importantly, a new type of muffler. The muffler system is simply described as a series of baffles. The end result is an airship which produces no discernible noise, to be used on scouting missions in the war.
