= Tom Swift and His Wizard Camera =

1912 novel by Victor Appleton

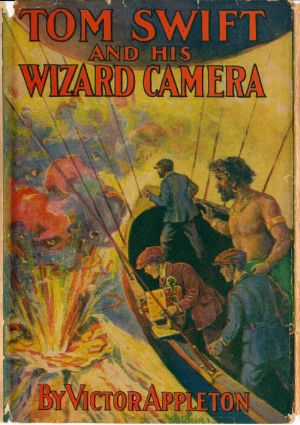
- Author: Victor Appleton
- Original title: Tom Swift and His Wizard Camera, or, Thrilling Adventures While Taking Moving Pictures
- Language: English
- Series: Tom Swift
- Genre: Young adult novel Adventure novel
- Publisher: Grosset & Dunlap
- Publication date: 1912
- Publication place: United States
- Media type: Print (hardback & paperback)
- Pages: 200+ pp
- ISBN: 978-1515136590
- Preceded by: Tom Swift in Captivity
- Followed by: Tom Swift and His Great Searchlight
- Text: Tom Swift and His Wizard Camera at Wikisource

Tom Swift and His Wizard Camera, or, Thrilling Adventures While Taking Moving Pictures, is Volume 14 in the original Tom Swift novel series published by Grosset & Dunlap.

== Plot summary ==
Tom Swift is still working on his long-term project, a noiseless airship, when he is approached by James Period, the owner of a motion picture company. Mr. Period wants to hire Tom to travel around the world and take motion pictures of strange and exotic places. These films will be shown in theaters, hoping that the exciting content will draw crowds. At first Tom declines, but eventually his adventurous streak wins out, and Tom sets out with friends for some old-time reality motion pictures.

== Inventions and innovation ==
Mentioned in a previous volume, Tom continues to work on his noiseless airship. When Tom finally takes up Mr. Period's proposal, a new motion picture camera must be designed and built. This is a camera that can run on battery power or from a dynamo, being fully automatic. It can also be operated by a hand-crank.

Built especially for this trip is a new airship, The Flyer. With a longer range, and accommodations for long-term trips, this is probably the biggest airship Tom has built to date.

- Tom Swift and His Wizard Camera
- Tom Swift and His Wizard Camera e-text at Project Gutenberg
