= Croak =

Croak may refer to:

- Croak, the sound that frogs make
- "Croak" (Yellowjackets), an episode of the American TV series Yellowjackets

== People with the surname ==
- Alex Croak (born 1984), Australian athlete
- James Croak (born 1951), American visual artist
- John Croak (1892–1918), Canadian soldier
- Marian Croak (born 1955), American engineer

== See also ==
- Croaker (disambiguation)
- Ribbit (disambiguation)
