= Tom Swift and His Air Glider =

1912 novel by Victor Appleton

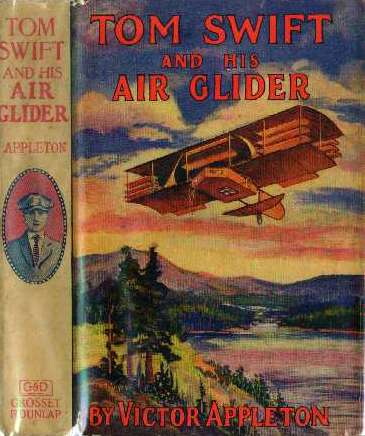
- Author: Victor Appleton
- Original title: Tom Swift and His Air Glider, or, Seeking the Platinum Treasure
- Language: English
- Series: Tom Swift
- Genre: Young adult novel Adventure novel
- Publisher: Grosset & Dunlap
- Publication date: 1912
- Publication place: United States
- Media type: Print (hardback & paperback)
- Pages: 200+ pp
- Preceded by: Tom Swift in the City of Gold
- Followed by: Tom Swift in Captivity
- Text: Tom Swift and His Air Glider at Wikisource

Tom Swift and His Air Glider, or, Seeking the Platinum Treasure, is Volume 12 in the original Tom Swift novel series published by Grosset & Dunlap.

== Plot summary ==
While testing out one of his many airships, Tom needs to make emergency landing for repairs. He complains of the poor quality platinum used for his magneto, and is overheard by an escaped Russian exile. The man tells Tom of a secret platinum mine, deep in Siberia. The man also explains that his brother is still in exile, and will be more useful in locating the mine. Tom organizes an expedition to save the exile and find the platinum mine.

It is to note that the Russian revolutionaries in the book are referred to as the Nihilist movement. However, given the time in which the book takes place, the author would more likely have been referring to Bolsheviks.

== Inventions & Innovation ==
For this adventure, Tom needs to build the Vulture, a special glider that can withstand the high-velocity winds in the vicinity of the mine.

Also, to transport the glider and his friends over the Atlantic, across Europe, and into Siberia, Tom builds his largest airship yet, the Falcon.
