= Tom Swift Among the Fire Fighters =

Book by Victor Appleton

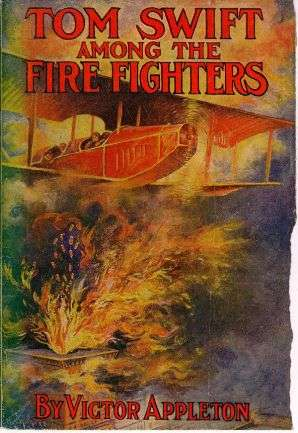
- Author: Victor Appleton
- Original title: Tom Swift Among the Fire Fighters, or, Battling Flames From the Air
- Language: English
- Series: Tom Swift
- Genre: Young adult novel Adventure novel
- Publisher: Grosset & Dunlap
- Publication date: 1921
- Publication place: United States
- Media type: Print (Hardback & Paperback)
- Pages: 200+ pp
- ISBN: 978-1515136682
- Preceded by: Tom Swift and His Undersea Search
- Followed by: Tom Swift and His Electric Locomotive

Tom Swift Among the Fire Fighters, Or, Battling Flames From the Air, is Volume 24 in the original Tom Swift novel series published by Grosset & Dunlap.

== Plot summary ==
While Tom and Ned Newton are reviewing financial records, a fire breaks out at the fireworks factory in town. Assisting the firemen, they rescue Josephus Baxter, Mr. Baxter is developing a new dye formula and has hired out laboratory space at the factory. During the mayhem created by the fire and the rescue, Mr. Baxter loses the formula, but he is positive that the owners of the factory have stolen it. Tom feels pity for the man and allows him the use the labs at the Swift Construction Company.

While observing the blaze, Tom wonders if there is not a more efficient way to fight the fire, especially having troubles with multi-storied buildings or skyscrapers. These thoughts lead him to develop a new fire suppressant chemical, and an air-borne system to deliver the new chemicals to the upper stories of skyscrapers.

Tom also rescues a small boat in distress, with the aid of a naphtha launch.

== Inventions & Innovation ==
The bulk of inventions are centered on various chemical compounds which will be used to suppress the fire. Tom has several iterations of a promising chemical, which basically delivers carbon dioxide into the blaze in such quantity as to suffocate the fire in a very short period of time. The formula is contained in special carboys which Tom terms grenades, designed to be dropped (either manually or automatically) from the air.

When the formula is considered ideal, the next step will be to develop a delivery system using airships. A four-passenger airship is built, with sufficient storage to carry an unspecified amount of the fire-fighting grenades. To aid in dropping grenades, Tom builds a bombsight, which, when mechanically adjusted for altitude, air speed, wind, and the weight of the grenades, will permit accurate placement of the grenades over the target.
