= Tom Swift IV =

Series of science fiction novels

Tom Swift IV is the unofficial name of a series of juvenile science fiction adventure novels, the fourth to feature a protagonist named Tom Swift. The series ran for thirteen titles from 1991 to 1993, and were published by Simon & Schuster imprint Archway Paperbacks; like the previous three series, the series was written under the pseudonym Victor Appleton. Unlike the previous series, it was not created by the Stratemeyer Syndicate; by this time, the Syndicate had been sold to Simon & Schuster, who created the series in response to the successful, more mature spin-offs of Syndicate properties Nancy Drew and The Hardy Boys.

== Background ==
=== Premise ===
Daring, resourceful Tom Swift Jr. is the teenage son of gifted scientist Tom Swift Sr. and Mary Nestor. However, Tom is also gifted scientist and inventor in his own right, as is his sister Sandra. Tom Sr. is the head of Swift Enterprises located in the Silicon Valley town of Jefferson, California (a departure from previous series, which were set in upstate New York), which is also where the Swifts live. Like the third series, an ethnically diverse cast of characters is featured, though the Swifts themselves are still White.

Akin to the Files and Casefiles series, this series uses more violence and action. For example, in The Negative Zone, Tom blows up a motel room to escape the authorities. Also unlike previous series, this series shows that Tom's genius can sometimes be problematic and dangerous; many of his inventions have unintended and negative consequences. In The DNA Disaster, Tom inadvertently causes Devolution (biology) with his latest invention.

=== Production ===
In 1985, the Stratemeyer Syndicate was sold to Simon & Schuster after the death of Harriet Adams three years earlier. Shortly afterwards, the publishers launched spin-offs of mainstays Nancy Drew and The Hardy Boys with The Nancy Drew Files in 1986 and The Hardy Boys Casefiles in 1987. These series were aimed towards a more mature audience, and were successful; at their height, the series published a new title every month.

In 1990, Simon & Schuster decided to launch a fourth Tom Swift series, to capitalize on the success of the more mature spin-offs. However, unlike the Files and Casefiles series - which were handled by book packager Mega-Books, the new Tom Swift series was handled by Byron Preiss Visual Publications. Like the previous two Tom Swift series, this series' protagonist is Tom Swift Jr., the son of Tom Swift Sr. and Mary Nestor. However, this series combined elements from both Tom Swift Jr. and the 1980s Tom Swift series in making their new Tom Swift.

Ultimately, the new Tom Swift series struggled to match the success of its counterparts, even when a crossover spin-off of its own with the Casefiles series was launched. The series ended in 1993, with thirteen titles and two cross-over books being printed.

== List of titles ==
Titles, authorship, and publication dates
| # | Title | Pub. | Ghostwriter |
|---|---|---|---|
| 1 | The Black Dragon | April 1991 | Bill McCay |
| 2 | The Negative Zone | April 1991 | Bill McCay |
| 3 | Cyborg Kickboxer | June 1991 | Steven Grant |
| 4 | The DNA Disaster | August 1991 | F. Gwynplaine MacIntyre |
| 5 | Monster Machine | October 1991 | Debra Doyle & James D. Macdonald |
| 6 | Aquatech Warriors | December 1991 | Debra Doyle & James D. Macdonald |
| 7 | Moonstalker | February 1992 | |
| 8 | The Microbots | April 1992 | Robert E. Vardeman |
| 9 | Fire Biker | June 1992 | |
| 10 | Mind Games | October 1992 | Bruce Holland Rogers |
| 11 | Mutant Beach | December 1992 | Robert E. Vardeman |
| 12 | Death Quake | February 1993 | Bridget McKenna |
| 13 | Quantum Force | April 1993 | |

=== The Hardy Boys/Tom Swift Ultra Thrillers ===
This was a spin-off crossover series with The Hardy Boys Casefiles, similar to the Supermystery series (which was a crossover The Hardy Boys had with Nancy Drew). The Hardy Boys' Franklin W. Dixon pseudonym was the only one attributed to this series, though it was produced by Bryon Preiss.

1. Time Bomb (August 1992)
2. The Alien Factor (June 1993)
