= Tom Swift and His Sky Racer =

1911 novel by Victor Appleton

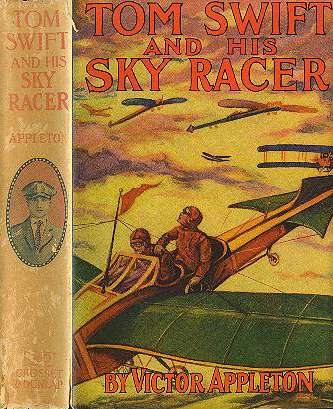
- Author: Victor Appleton
- Original title: Tom Swift and His Sky Racer, or, The Speediest Flight on Record
- Language: English
- Series: Tom Swift
- Genre: Young adult novel Adventure novel
- Publisher: Grosset & Dunlap
- Publication date: 1911
- Publication place: United States
- Media type: Print (hardback & paperback)
- Pages: 200+ pp
- Preceded by: Tom Swift in the Caves of Ice
- Followed by: Tom Swift and His Electric Rifle
- Text: Tom Swift and His Sky Racer at Wikisource

Tom Swift and His Sky Racer, or, The Speediest Flight on Record, is Volume 9 in the original Tom Swift novel series published by Grosset & Dunlap.

== Plot summary ==
A $10,000 prize lures Tom into competing at a local aviation meet at Eagle Park. Tom is determined to build the fastest plane around, but his plans mysteriously disappear, which means Tom must redesign his new airplane from the beginning. A side-plot through the story is Mr. Swift's failing health.

== Inventions & Innovation ==
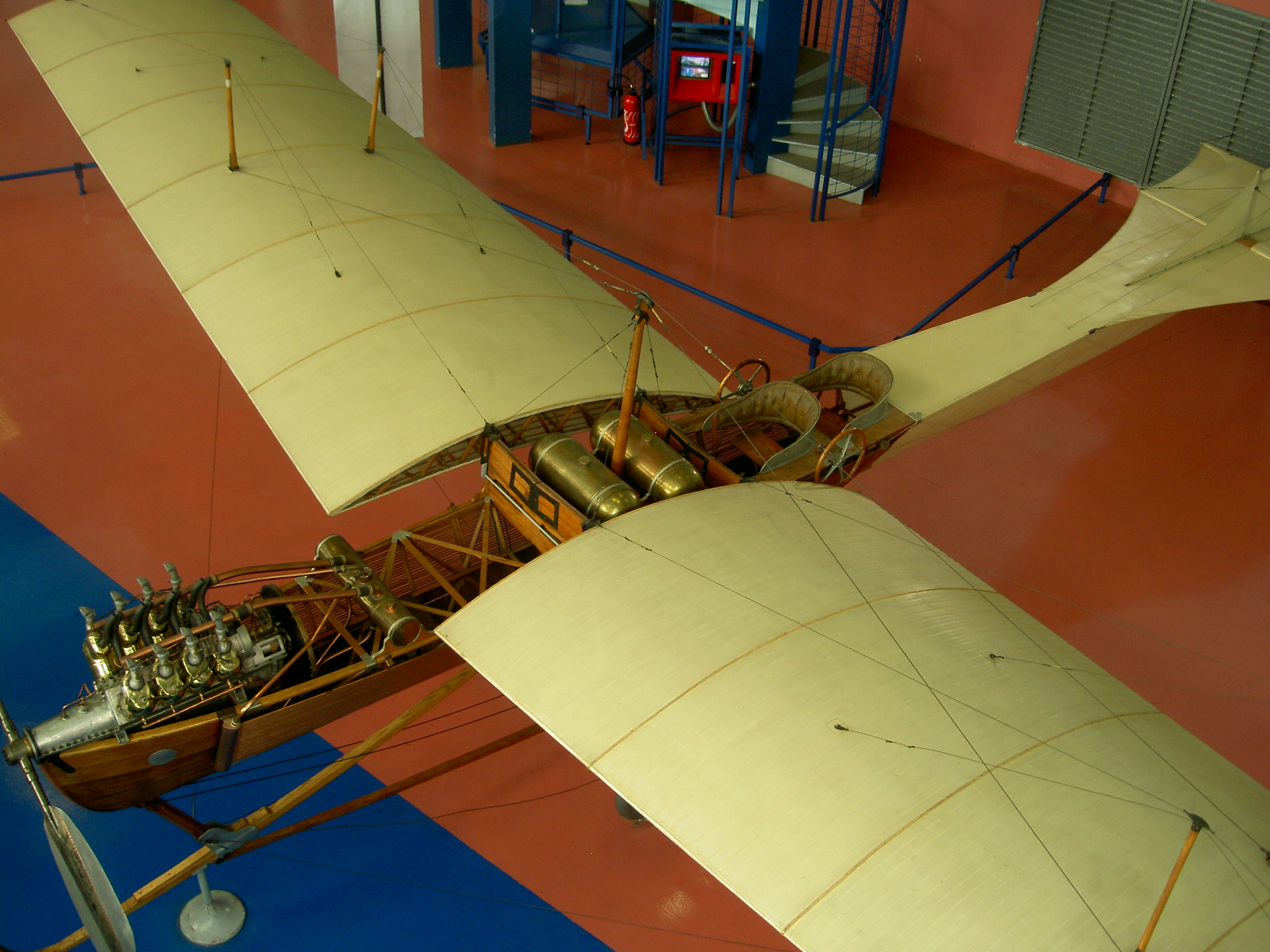
1909 era monoplane similar in form to Tom's Sky Racer.

Tom's Sky Racer, known as the Humming-Bird, is a two-seater monoplane, like his previous monoplane the Butterfly. However, the Sky Racer, is smaller and faster — making it ideal for air racing. It uses a single gasoline, air-cooled engine, which can attain air speeds of well over 100 mph with a minimum thrust of 1000 lbs at 2000rpm. Tom also invented an automated stabilizing unit which allowed the Sky Racer to handle adverse weather conditions without loss of control. The Sky Racer's design was compared to that of the Blériot XI and the Antoinette VII, however its wings were patterned after that of the hummingbird, rather than standard rectangular wings.
