= Tom Swift and His Electric Runabout =

1910 book by Victor Appleton

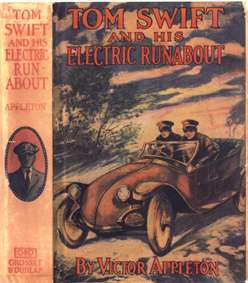
- Author: Victor Appleton
- Original title: Tom Swift and His Electric Runabout, or, The Speediest Car on the Road
- Language: English
- Series: Tom Swift
- Genre: Young adult novel Adventure novel
- Publisher: Grosset & Dunlap
- Publication date: 1910
- Publication place: United States
- Media type: Print (hardback & paperback)
- Pages: 200+ pp
- Preceded by: Tom Swift and His Submarine Boat
- Followed by: Tom Swift and His Wireless Message
- Text: Tom Swift and His Electric Runabout at Wikisource

Tom Swift and His Electric Runabout, or, The Speediest Car on the Road, is Volume 5 in the original Tom Swift novel series published by Grosset & Dunlap.

== Plot summary ==
Tom Swift enters an upcoming race with his specially designed prototype electric race car. But as he makes the final preparations and adjustments, days before the race, he discovers a plot that would bankrupt not only his family, but also everyone else that relies on the local bank (which is the target of a nefarious bank run scheme). Tom must solve the mystery and stop the criminals behind the plot before he will test himself on a 500-mile race against some of the best cars and skilled drivers in the United States.

== Inventions & innovation ==
Tom Swift invents a groundbreaking, powerful new rechargeable battery with half the recharge time (allowing Tom to leave other battery-powered race cars far behind while at the track).

Tom has taken electric vehicles to a new level with his convertible sports car. His custom vehicle was designed from the ground up for performance and speed, with a top rate of 100 mph and a range of 400 miles (on a single charge). Over 100 years later, electric cars can finally exceed what Tom designed in his spare time. His aerodynamic convertible was painted a glossy purple, a color that would not to be overlooked when caught sight of on the speedway.
