= Tom Swift III =

Series of science fiction novels

Tom Swift III is the unofficial name of this series of juvenile science fiction adventure novels, the third to feature a protagonist named Tom Swift. Unlike the previous series, it was not published by the Grosset & Dunlap, but was published by Wanderer Books, a division of Simon & Schuster, which, at the tail-end of the series bought and obtained the rights of the Stratemeyer Syndicate's series. However, all gave the author as Victor Appleton, as with the previous series.

This series is primarily set in outer space, with various missions to solar system locales.

This series was released in paperback format, although one hardback edition was released of the first nine volumes.

Books in the series:

1. The City in the Stars (1981)
2. Terror on the Moons of Jupiter (1981)
3. The Alien Probe (1981)
4. The War in Outer Space (1981)
5. The Astral Fortress (1981)
6. The Rescue Mission (1981)
7. Ark Two (1982)
8. Crater of Mystery (1983)
9. The Gateway to Doom (1983)
10. The Invisible Force (1983)
11. Planet of Nightmares (1984)
12. Chaos on Earth (1984, Unpublished)
13. Microworld (1985, Unpublished)
