= Tom Swift in the City of Gold =

1912 novel by Victor Appleton

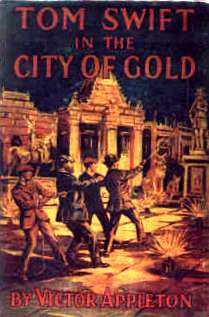
- Author: Victor Appleton
- Original title: Tom Swift in the City of Gold, or, Marvelous Adventures Underground
- Language: English
- Series: Tom Swift
- Genre: Young adult novel Adventure novel
- Publisher: Grosset & Dunlap
- Publication date: 1912
- Publication place: United States
- Media type: Print (hardback & paperback)
- Pages: 216
- Preceded by: Tom Swift and His Electric Rifle
- Followed by: Tom Swift and His Air Glider
- Text: Tom Swift in the City of Gold at Wikisource

Tom Swift in the City of Gold, or, Marvelous Adventures Underground, is Volume 11 in the original Tom Swift novel series published by Grosset & Dunlap.

== Plot summary ==
Tom receives a message from his missionary friend whom he saved from captivity in Africa during the adventures of the preceding volume. The message describes a wonderful underground city, filled with treasures of gold, somewhere deep in the heart of Mexico. Not one to turn down adventure, Tom accepts the challenge to find the lost city.

Around this time, Andy Foger and his father had lost their fortunes and are off after Tom's trail in order to steal the treasures from him. In order to make the trip possible, Tom must remodel his previous airship- a hot air balloon with an enclosed cabin. Accompanying him on the journey is Ned Newton, Mr. Damon, and Eradicate. They set off on a tramp steamer to Mexico. On this steamer, they uncover two mysterious passengers who they confirm to be the Fogers.

In Mexico, they hire a team of Mexicans who catch onto the city of gold plot and chase after it in competition with Tom as well as the Fogers. To make things worse, Tom had been warned about "Head Hunters" by his missionary friend.

After finding the underground city and losing the trail of the two competing parties, Tom's gang end up accidentally sealing themselves into the city for about a week. They finally escape when their enemies release them unintentionally. The Fogers and the Mexican team show up at the entrance with the escort of the Head Hunters. By trying to get in, they let Tom and his team out. Before the others can explore the city, an underground river floods it and they make off with a huge wealth of salvaged gold.

== Characters ==
- Tom Swift. The protagonist of the book. Leader of the group searching for the city.
- Ned Newton. Tom's chum who is accompanying him on his quest.
- Mr. Swift. Tom's father. He has fallen ill in this book and cannot make the trip.
- Mr. Damon. Eccentric man who calls blessings on everything. Also accompanying Tom.
- Eradicate Sampson. A friend of Tom's. A black man who is hired as cook and worker for the trip.
- Andy Foger. Tom's rival, who is seeking to reclaim his fathers fortune in the city.
- Mr. Foger. Andy's father. Recently lost all his money and is looking to remake some from the golden city.
- Delazes. Nefarious Mexican out to foil Tom's plot and steal the gold for himself.
- Mary Nester. Tom's girlfriend whom he promises to bring gold back for.
- The Head Hunters. Legendary guards of the city known for hunting heads.

== Inventions & Innovation ==
Tom continues to improve on his airship designs, which are combined biplane and dirigibles. This time, a much smaller version of the Blackhawk is designed, with many of the same features.

The central gold statue has a warning carved on the pedestal it sits on in "the ancient Greek or Persian language". How this got into an underground Aztec city is never explained.

The temple on top of the entrance is also described as being rounded, instead of stepped.
