= Tom Swift and His Motor Boat =

1910 novel by Victor Appleton

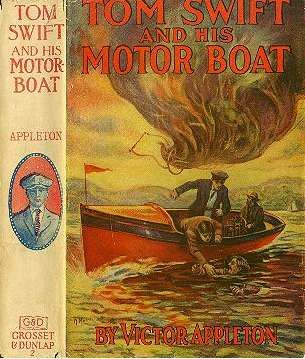
- Author: Victor Appleton
- Original title: Tom Swift and His Motor Boat, or, The Rivals of Lake Carlopa
- Language: English
- Series: Tom Swift
- Genre: Young adult novel Adventure novel
- Publisher: Grosset & Dunlap
- Publication date: 1910
- Publication place: United States
- Media type: Print (hardback & paperback)
- Pages: 200+ pp
- Preceded by: Tom Swift and His Motor Cycle
- Followed by: Tom Swift and His Airship
- Text: Tom Swift and His Motor Boat at Wikisource

Tom Swift and His Motor Boat, or, The Rivals of Lake Carlopa, is Volume 2 in the original Tom Swift novel series published by Grosset & Dunlap.

== Plot summary ==
Tom Swift's father, a world-famous scientist, has been robbed of one of his greatest inventions, and it's up to Tom to bring the criminals to justice without getting himself killed in the process. Unfortunately, Tom himself quickly becomes a target of the rogues' anger when he unknowingly buys a boat in which they had hidden a stolen diamond. Tom must use every bit of his wit to keep himself ahead of the gang of hardened felons.

== Inventions and innovation ==
- Tom purchased a used two-cylinder "family cruiser" lake boat at auction with the intention of customizing it. The model he purchased would have been from between the years 1900 and 1910 and was twenty-one feet in length. Among his modifications were: ignition system, water pump, oil system, spark plugs, and fuel tank. In the end, the cruiser's two-stroke engine was able to outpace the three-cylinder engine of his nemesis, Andy Foger.
- Barton Smith, Tom's father, was perfecting his latest invention: an electric gyroscope to be used in airplanes.
