= Neal Barrett Jr. =

American author (1929–2014)

- Born: November 3, 1929; San Antonio, Texas, U.S.
- Died: January 12, 2014 (aged 84); Austin, Texas, U.S.
- Occupation: Author
- Writing career
- Genres: Fantasy, suspense, mystery, science fiction, historical fiction

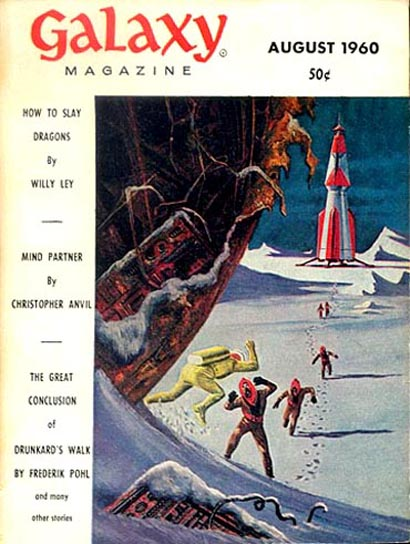
Barrett's first sf story, "To Tell the Truth" was originally published in the August 1960 issue of Galaxy Science Fiction

Neal Barrett Jr. (November 3, 1929 – January 12, 2014) was an American writer of fantasy, science fiction, mystery/suspense, and historical fiction. He also worked under the pseudonyms Victor Appleton, Chad Calhoun, Franklin W. Dixon (Stratemeyer Syndicate house names), Rebecca Drury, and J. D. Hardin.

== Biography ==
Barrett was born in San Antonio, Texas, but grew up in Oklahoma City, Oklahoma after his family relocated there in his infancy. His first published science fiction story was "To Tell the Truth" in the August, 1960 issue of Galaxy Science Fiction. After that he contributed short work to science fiction magazines with some regularity, but he was better known for his novels. His reputation was made in the late 1980s with the publication of his novel Through Darkest America and its sequel, Dawn's Uncertain Light. Beginning in the 1990s and continuing into his later years, Barrett focused less on science fiction and more on crime thrillers, though he continued to work in both genres, often in the screwball comedy style such as in his short story "Perpetuity Blues". He died in 2014 at the age of 84.

== Awards and honors ==
Barrett's story "Ginny Sweethips' Flying Circus" was nominated for both the 1988 Nebula Award for Best Novelette and the 1989 Hugo Award for Best Novelette. In 1997, he was the toastmaster at the 55th World Science Fiction Convention held in San Antonio. In 2010, he was named Author Emeritus by the Science Fiction and Fantasy Writers of America.

== Bibliography ==
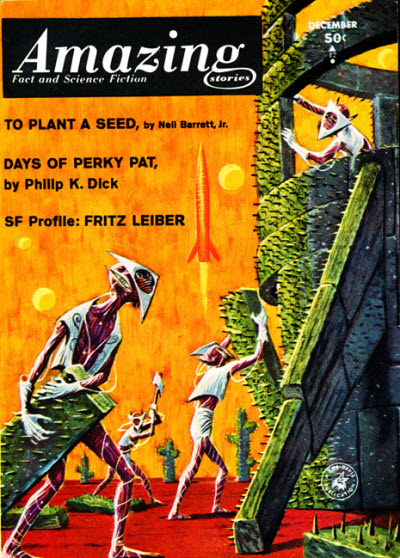
Barrett's novella "To Plant a Seed" was the cover story on the December 1963 issue of Amazing Stories

=== Non-fiction ===
Long Days and Short Nights, A Century of Texas Ranching on the YO 1880-1980

=== Novels ===
- Kelwin. Lancer Books. 1970.
- The Gates of Time. Ace Books, 1970.
- The Leaves of Time. Lancer Books, 1971.
- Highwood. Ace Books, 1972.
- Stress Pattern. DAW Books, 1974.
- Aldair in Albion. DAW Books, 1976.
- Aldair, Master of Ships. DAW Books, 1977.
- Aldair, Across the Misty Sea. DAW Books, 1980.
- Aldair: The Legion of Beasts. DAW Books, 1982.
- Ark Two. Simon & Schuster, 1982. Tom Swift book
- The Invisible Force. Simon & Schuster, 1983. Tom Swift book
- The Karma Corps. DAW Books, 1984.
- Through Darkest America. Congdon & Weed, 1987.
- Dawn's Uncertain Light. New American Library, 1989.
- The Hereafter Gang. Mark V. Ziesing, 1991.
- Pink Vodka Blues. St. Martin's Press, 1992.
- Dead Dog Blues. St. Martin's Press, 1994.
- Judge Dredd. Boxtree, 1995.
- Skinny Annie Blues. Kensington Books, 1996.
- Bad Eye Blues. Kensington Books, 1997.
- Interstate Dreams. Mojo Press, 1999.
- Dungeons & Dragons: The Movie. Wizards of the Coast, 2000.
- The Prophecy Machine. Bantam Books, 2000.
- The Treachery of Kings. Bantam Books, 2001.
- PIGGS. Subterranean Press, 2001.
- Prince Of Christler-Coke. Golden Gryphon Press, 2004.

=== Short fiction ===
Collections

- Slightly Off Center. SWAN Press, 1992.
- The Day the Decorators Came. Subterranean Press, 2000.
- Perpetuity Blues and Other Stories. Golden Gryphon Press, 2000.
- A Different Vintage. Subterranean Press, 2001.
- Way Out There. Subterranean Press, 2004.
- Other Seasons: The Best of Neal Barrett Jr.. Subterranean Press, 2012.
- A Pair of Aces Co-written with Joe R. Lansdale Amazon Kindle e-book 2014

Stories

Title	Year	First published	Reprinted/collected	Notes
The Graybes of Raath	1961	"The Graybes of Raath". Galaxy Science Fiction. 19 (5). June 1961.		
The Stentorii luggage	1960	"The Stentorii luggage". Galaxy Science Fiction. 19 (1). October 1960.		
To tell the truth	1960	"To tell the truth". Galaxy Science Fiction. 18 (6). August 1960.		

=== Critical studies and reviews of Barrett's work ===
Other seasons

- Heck, Peter (September 2013). "On Books". Asimov's Science Fiction. 37 (9): 107–111.

Perpetuity blues and other stories

- Sallis, James (Dec 2000). "Books". F&SF. 99 (6): 32–37. Archived from the original on December 27, 2004.
