= Tom Swift in the Land of Wonders =

1917 novel by Victor Appleton

Tom Swift In The Land of Wonders
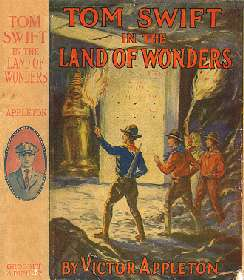
- Author: Victor Appleton
- Original title: Tom Swift In The Land of Wonders, Or, The Underground Search For the Idol of Gold
- Language: English
- Series: Tom Swift
- Genre: Young adult novel Adventure novel
- Publisher: Grosset & Dunlap
- Publication date: 1917
- Publication place: United States
- Media type: Print (Hardback & Paperback)
- Pages: 200+ pp
- Preceded by: Tom Swift and His Big Tunnel
- Followed by: Tom Swift and His War Tank

Tom Swift In The Land of Wonders, or, The Underground Search For the Idol of Gold, is Volume 20 in the original Tom Swift novel series published by Grosset & Dunlap.

== Plot summary ==
Professor Bumper, introduced in the previous volume, is on the trail of another lost city, this time the lost city of Kurzon, somewhere deep in Honduras. The Professor has come into some documents which he thinks will help him locate the city, and the documents make mention of a huge idol made of solid gold. Professor Bumper would very much like Tom Swift to accompany the expedition.

As circumstances would have it, Professor Bumpers rival, in the form of Professor Fenimore Beecher, is also on the trail of Kurzon. Unfortunately for Tom Swift, Professor Beecher is also trying to win the heart of Mary Nestor, Tom Swift's sweetheart! Envy, rather than fame or fortune, drive Tom to finally accompany the expedition to Honduras, as Tom hopes to prevent Professor Beecher from discovering the idol and presenting some of the gold to Mary Nestor as a betrothal gift.

== Inventions & Innovation ==
Inventions take a back-seat in this story. Prior to Professor Bumper's arrival, Tom Swift is working on a new gyroscope, which was also briefly introduced in the previous volume. In Europe, World War I continues to rage, and several European governments have expressed an interest in Tom Swift's new gyroscope, as safety devices for use in the aerial aspect of the war. When envy drives Tom to join the expedition, Tom hands the gyroscope project over to his father, Barton Swift, and it is not heard of for the rest of the story.
