= Tom Swift Among the Diamond Makers =

1911 novel by Victor Appleton

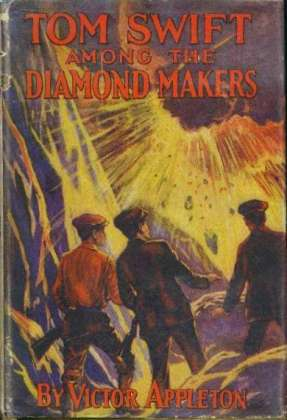
- Author: Victor Appleton
- Original title: Tom Swift Among the Diamond Makers, Or, The Secret of Phantom Mountain
- Language: English
- Series: Tom Swift
- Genre: Young adult novel Adventure novel
- Publisher: Grosset & Dunlap
- Publication date: 1911
- Publication place: United States
- Media type: Print (hardback & paperback)
- Pages: 200+ pp
- Preceded by: Tom Swift and His Wireless Message
- Followed by: Tom Swift in the Caves of Ice
- Text: Tom Swift Among the Diamond Makers at Wikisource

Tom Swift Among the Diamond Makers, Or, The Secret of Phantom Mountain, is Volume 7 in the original Tom Swift novel series published by Grosset & Dunlap.

== Plot summary ==
Tom Swift flies his airship to the mountain tops of Colorado to seek for the secret of the Diamond Makers: criminal scientists who have figured out the formula of manufacturing a limitless fortune in diamonds. But these rogues will stop at nothing to keep their secret. Tom & friends are soon captured and left to die in a collapsing mountain.

== Inventions & innovation ==
Although the story still revolves around invention, Tom did not have any part in the invention. In this story, the major invention, and plot device, is a diamond-making machine, utilizing the power of harnessed lightning. Unfortunately for Tom and friends, they were never able to get close enough to the machinery to determine the secret to making diamonds.
