= Tom Swift in Captivity =

1912 novel by Victor Appleton

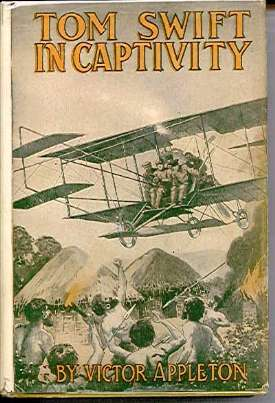
- Author: Victor Appleton
- Original title: Tom Swift in Captivity, or, A Daring Escape by Airship
- Language: English
- Series: Tom Swift
- Genre: Young adult novel Adventure novel
- Publisher: Grosset & Dunlap
- Publication date: 1912
- Publication place: United States
- Media type: Print (hardback & paperback)
- Pages: 200+ pp
- Preceded by: Tom Swift and His Air Glider
- Followed by: Tom Swift and His Wizard Camera
- Text: Tom Swift in Captivity at Wikisource

Tom Swift in Captivity, or, A Daring Escape by Airship, is Volume 13 in the original Tom Swift novel series published by Grosset & Dunlap. The work was also published under the title Tom Swift in Giant Land or, A Daring Escape From Captivity.

== Plot summary ==
Tom Swift is approached by Mr. Preston, the owner of a circus, and begins to tell the story of Jake Poddington, Mr. Preston's most skilled hunter. As it turns out, Jake went missing just after sending word to Preston that Jake was on the trail of a tribe of giants, somewhere in South America. That was the last Preston has heard of Jake Poddington. Preston would like Tom to use one of his airships to search for Poddington, and if possible, bring back a giant for the circus.

== Inventions & Innovation ==
Inventions are not a major part of the story. Prior to the story opening, Tom has already built The Lark, a new version of his sky racer, The Hummingbird. This is a more traditional prop job than his previous airships. In the background is mentioned that Tom is also working on a new "silent airship". Tom's electric rifle also makes a regular appearance in this adventure.
