= Tom Swift and His Wireless Message =

1911 novel by Victor Appleton

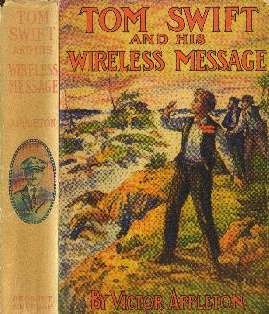
- Author: Victor Appleton
- Original title: Tom Swift and His Wireless Message, or, The Castaways of Earthquake Island
- Language: English
- Series: Tom Swift
- Genre: Young adult novel Adventure novel
- Publisher: Grosset & Dunlap
- Publication date: 1911
- Publication place: United States
- Media type: Print (hardback & paperback)
- Pages: 200+ pp
- ISBN: 978-1515037835
- Preceded by: Tom Swift and His Electric Runabout
- Followed by: Tom Swift Among the Diamond Makers
- Text: Tom Swift and His Wireless Message at Wikisource

Tom Swift and His Wireless Message, or, The Castaways of Earthquake Island, is Volume 6 in the original Tom Swift novel series published by Grosset & Dunlap.

== Plot summary ==
Tom Swift & friends decide to trial an experimental airship near the New Jersey coast, and are unexpectedly swept out to sea by hurricane winds. Unable to steer or navigate without tearing the airship apart, the hapless crew must simply let the storm take them wherever it will. Unfortunately, the storm proves too much for the craft and Tom makes a crash landing on the uninhabited and crumbling Earthquake Island.

== Inventions & innovation ==
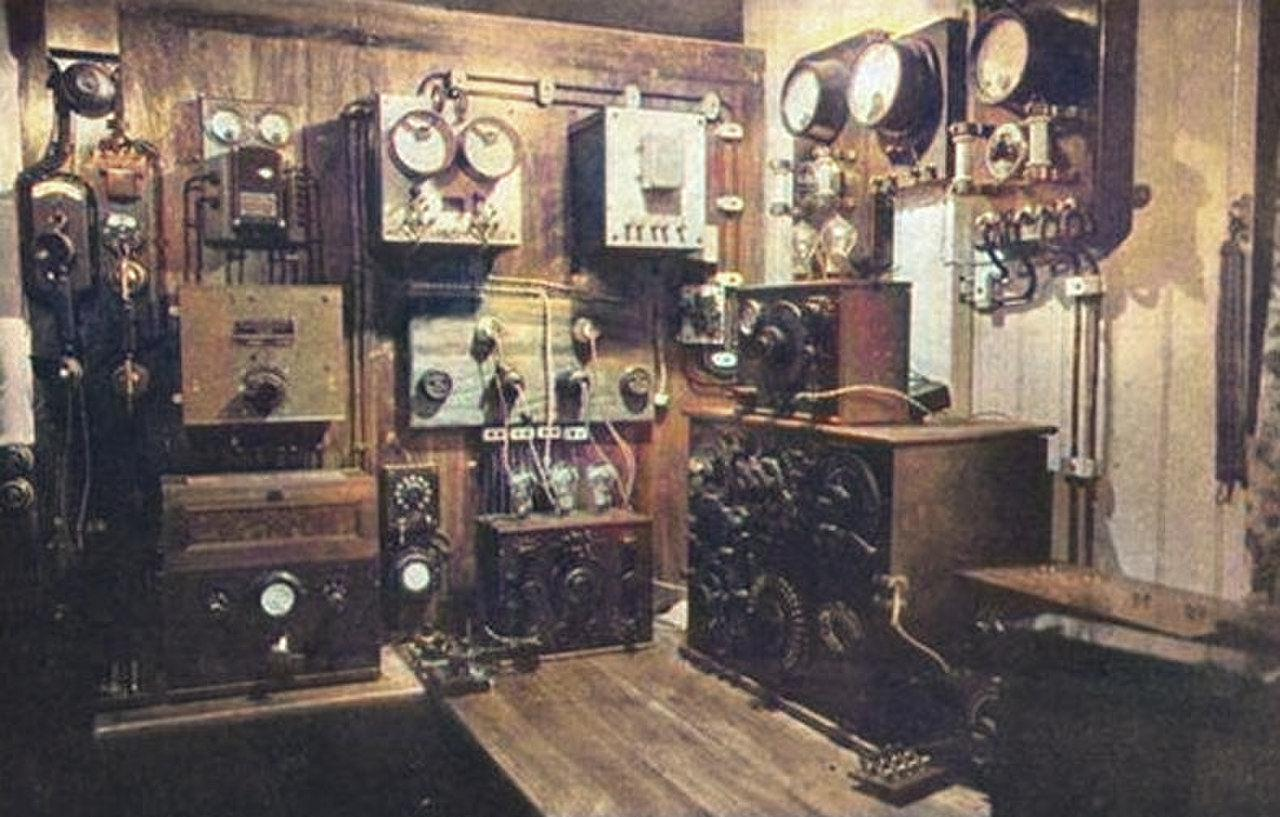
A radio transmitter station from 1922.

The island is not entirely uninhabited, as the survivors of a shipwreck are also stranded on the island. Both groups quickly come upon each other, and working together, they are able to survive as Tom Swift builds a spark-gap transmitter radio from salvaged parts. Tom Swift used the older and more established CQD distress call, which had been in use since 1904. The newer SOS distress call was adopted two years prior the timeframe of the story, in 1908. In contrast, in 1912 when the RMS Titanic sank, the wireless operator transmitted their distress in both CQD and SOS formats.
