= Tom Swift and His Airship =

1910 novel by Victor Appleton

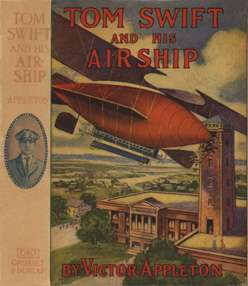
- Author: Victor Appleton
- Original title: Tom Swift and His Airship, or, The Stirring Cruise of the Red Cloud
- Language: English
- Series: Tom Swift
- Genre: Young adult novel Adventure novel
- Publisher: Grosset & Dunlap
- Publication date: 1910
- Publication place: United States
- Media type: Print (hardback & paperback)
- Pages: 200+ pp
- Preceded by: Tom Swift and His Motor Boat
- Followed by: Tom Swift and His Submarine Boat
- Text: Tom Swift and His Airship at Wikisource

Tom Swift and His Airship, or, The Stirring Cruise of the Red Cloud, is Volume 3 in the original Tom Swift novel series published by Grosset & Dunlap.

== Plot summary ==
In Tom Swift and His Airship, Tom Swift has finished his latest invention- the Red Cloud, a fast and innovative airship. Tom is anxious for a cross-country trial, but just before he and his friends take off, the Shopton bank is robbed. No sooner is Tom in the air than he is blamed for the robbery. Suddenly, he's a wanted fugitive but doesn't know why until he's halfway across the country. With no safe harbor or friend on the land below, Tom must race back to Shopton to clear his name before he's shot out of the sky.

== Inventions & innovation ==
- Tom Swift, and his friend (John Sharp - aeronaut extraordinaire), designed and built the Red Cloud: an airship that was half blimp/dirigible and half airplane. In fact, it had two wings (like the World War I biplanes) extending out from a spacious gondola which sat beneath the rather voluminous gas-filled balloon. It was fast, achieving over 80 mph if pressed, and could stay in the air for two weeks at a time, if Tom wanted. Perhaps the most fantastic element of the craft was the gondola, which was luxuriously appointed with multiple rooms; e.g., a kitchen, an engine room, and a first-rate observation room from which Tom would steer the ship, while looking out the surrounding windows.
- Barton Swift, Tom's father, is nearing completion of a submarine design that promises to be the most advanced in the world.
