= Croker (disambiguation) =

Croker may refer to:

== People ==
=== Arts and entertainment ===
- Bithia Mary Croker (née Sheppard, 1849–1920), Anglo-Indian novelist
- Brendan Croker (born 1953), British musician
- Charlie Croker, Michael Caine's character in the British film The Italian Job
- T. F. Dillon Croker (1831–1912), British antiquary and poet
- C. Martin Croker (1962–2016), American voice actor and animator
- Nigel Croker, fictional character in the British TV programme Mile High
- Theo Croker (born 1985), American jazz trumpeter, singer, and bandleader
- Thomas Crofton Croker (1798–1854), Irish antiquary

=== Politics ===
- Bula Croker (1884–1957), Native American activist
- Cyril Croker (1888–1958), member of the New Zealand Legislative Council
- David Croker (1932–2006), British environmental activist
- John Wilson Croker (1780–1857), Irish statesman and author
- Richard Croker (1843–1922), American politician

=== Sport ===
- Garry Croker, Australian Paralympic wheelchair rugby and table tennis player
- Jarrod Croker (born 1990), Australian professional rugby league footballer
- Jason Croker (born 1973), Australian rugby league player
- Norma Croker (1934–2019), Australian former sprinter
- Peter Croker (1921–2011), English footballer
- Robin Croker, British cyclist
- Ted Croker (1924–1992), English football administrator

== Places ==
- Croker Bay, Nunavut, Canada
- Croker Hill, Peak District, England
- Croker Island, Northern Territory, Australia
  - Croker Group, island group that includes Croker Island
- Croker Passage, Antarctica
- Croker River, Nunavut, Canada

== Sport ==
- An informal name for Croke Park, a sports stadium in Ireland
- Croker Oars, Australian manufacturer of rowing oars

== See also ==
- Croaker (disambiguation)
