= Tom Swift and His Photo Telephone =

1914 novel by Victor Appleton

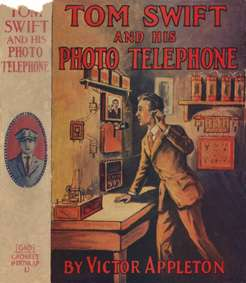
- Author: Victor Appleton
- Original title: Tom Swift and His Photo Telephone, or, The Picture That Saved A Fortune
- Language: English
- Series: Tom Swift
- Genre: Young adult novel Adventure novel
- Publisher: Grosset & Dunlap
- Publication date: 1914
- Publication place: United States
- Media type: Print (Hardback & Paperback)
- Pages: 200+ pp
- Preceded by: Tom Swift and His Giant Cannon
- Followed by: Tom Swift and His Aerial Warship
- Text: Tom Swift and His Photo Telephone at Wikisource

Tom Swift and His Photo Telephone, or, The Picture That Saved A Fortune, is Volume 17 in the original Tom Swift novel series published by Grosset & Dunlap by Victor Appleton

== Plot summary ==
Tom and his father are arguing about Tom's latest idea, a photo telephone. Mr. Swift is adamant that the idea will not work, but Tom has some ideas in mind, and refuses to back down. Tom read about a recent news event where a photograph was transmitted over telegraph lines, and there is no functional difference between the wires used for a telephone to those used in telegraphs.

In the meantime, some shady occurrences are happening in the neighborhood. Tom and Ned are almost run over by a speeding motor boat, operated by a con-artist known as Shallock Peters. The feud between Mr. Peters and Tom begins when Mr. Peters refuses to acknowledge the accident. The animosity between the two only grows deeper as Mr. Peters tries to buy Tom out of some of his inventions, under the guise of making a profit. Tom refuses to allow anyone other than himself permissions to his patents, and this infuriates Mr. Peters. Later, Tom learns that his good friend, Mr. Damon, is having serious financial troubles. As the plot gets thicker and thicker, one of Tom's airships is stolen, and then Mr. Damon unexpectedly disappears. All this while Tom is desperately trying to get his latest invention working.

== Inventions and innovation ==
The photo telephone is a modification to normal telephones. A third wire is used to transmit the image, which is displayed on charged selenium plates. The image is not a live video image, but rather a static one-time image, a photograph, used mainly for identification of the remote end. The plates can be reused, or can be developed to produce a permanent copy. A side-improvement to the whole system is done when Tom attaches a phonograph cylinder recorder to the telephone system, preserving not only a visual image but an audio recording.

- Tom Swift and His Photo Telephone e-text at Project Gutenberg
