= Tom Swifty =

Form of word play

A Tom Swifty (or Tom Swiftie) is a phrase in which a quoted sentence is linked by a pun to the manner in which it is attributed. Tom Swifties may be considered a type of wellerism. The standard syntax is for the quoted sentence to be first, followed by the pun (usually a description of the act of speaking):

"If you want me, I shall be in the attic," said Tom, loftily.

The hypothetical speaker is usually, by convention, called "Tom" (or "he" or "she").

== Origins ==
The name comes from the Tom Swift series of books (1910–present), similar in many ways to the better-known Hardy Boys and Nancy Drew series, and, like them, produced by the Stratemeyer Syndicate.

Written under the house pseudonym of "Victor Appleton", a stylistic idiosyncrasy of the books was that they took great trouble to avoid repetition of the unadorned word "said", instead using a different quotative verb, or modifying adverbial words or phrases in a kind of elegant variation. This led to a parody of the style by incorporation of a pun, called a Tom Swiftly after the archetypal example: "'We must hurry,' said Tom Swiftly." At some point, this kind of humor was called a Tom Swifty, and that name is now more prevalent.

A much earlier example may be found, for example, in Dickens' Our Mutual Friend:

"How Do You Like London?" Mr Podsnap now inquired from his station of host, as if he were administering something in the nature of a powder or potion to the deaf child; "London, Londres, London?"

The foreign gentleman admired it.

"You find it Very Large?" said Mr. Podsnap, spaciously.

== Examples ==
- "I'm freezing!" Tom remarked icily.
- "Don't ask me why I was at the mausoleum," Tom said cryptically.
- "Pass the damn shellfish," said Tom crabbily.
- "Get to the back of the ship!" Tom said sternly.
- "I forgot what I needed at the store," Tom said listlessly.
- "I'd like my money back, and then some," said Tom with interest.
- "I dropped my toothpaste," Tom said, crestfallen. (a reference to Crest toothpaste)
- "I love hot dogs," said Tom with relish.
- "Don't let me add too much water," Tom said, with great concentration.
- "Another martini would be fine," said Tom dryly.
- "I'm wearing a ribbon around my arm," said Tom with abandon.
- "Baa," said Tom sheepishly.
- "There's no more room in the hay barn," said Tom balefully.
- "We're out of flowers," said Tom lackadaisically.
- "I have a split personality," said Tom, being frank.
- "I'm having an affair with my gamekeeper," said the lady, chattily. (a reference to Lady Chatterley's Lover)
- "That's the last time I put my hand in a lion's mouth," the lion-tamer said off-handedly.

Tom Swifties where the pun is applied to the verb form of speech may be termed a croaker:

- "We just struck oil!" Tom gushed.
- "Stay away from that turtle!" Tom snapped.
- "I used to be a gold miner," Tom exclaimed.
- "I decided to come back to the group," Tom rejoined.

== History ==
Tom Swifties first came to prominence in the United States with the 1963 publication of the book Tom Swifties by Paul Pease and Bill McDonough. The spread of Tom Swifties was abetted by an article in the May 31, 1963, edition of Time magazine, which also announced a contest for its readers to submit their own Tom Swifties. Included was a special category, "Time Swifties", which were to contain a reference to Time magazine; however, only a few submissions were made of this nature. Among the submissions that were subsequently printed was "'Someone has stolen my movie camera!' Tom bellowed and howled".

The Time contest caused the popularity of Tom Swifties to grow for a period of some years. Tom Swifties found a large teenage audience in the joke column on the last page of each month's issue of Boys' Life, the magazine for Boy Scouts.

In the late '60s, comedian Stan Freberg created and narrated a series of radio commercials for the Milky Way candy bar with a character named "Tom Sweet", voiced by Walter Tetley, where Tom Swifty puns were frequent, such as, "'Ah, now for some shut-eye,' said Tom, retiringly."

In January 2017 Jack Waley-Cohen appeared on the British BBC Radio 4 program The Museum of Curiosity; his hypothetical donation to this imaginary museum was "A Book of Tom Swifties".
