= Tom Swift Jr. =

Fictional character in boys' adventure books

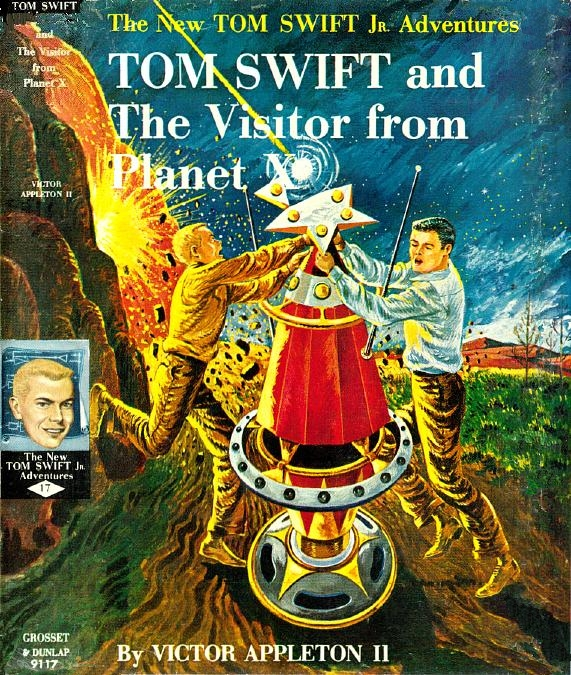
- Front cover of Tom Swift and The Visitor from Planet X (1961)
- Author: Harriet (Stratemeyer) Adams, James Duncan Lawrence
- Illustrator: Graham Kaye
- Country: United States of America
- Language: English
- Genre: Science fiction Adventure
- Publisher: Grosset & Dunlap
- Published: 1954-1971
- Published in English: 1954-1971
- Media type: Print

Tom Swift Jr. is the central character in a series of over thirty science fiction adventure novels for male adolescents, following in the tradition of the earlier Tom Swift ("Senior") novels. The series was titled The New Tom Swift Jr. Adventures. Unlike the Nancy Drew and Hardy Boys titles that were also products of the prolific Stratemeyer Syndicate, the original Tom Swift stories were not rewritten in the 1950s to modernize them. It was decided that the protagonist of the new series would be the son of the earlier Tom Swift and his wife, Mary Nestor Swift; the original hero continued as a series regular, as did his pal Ned Newton. The covers were created by illustrator J. Graham Kaye. Covers in the later half of the series were mostly by Charles Brey. A total of 33 volumes were eventually published.

For the Tom Swift Jr. series the books were outlined mostly by Harriet (Stratemeyer) Adams, head of the Stratemeyer Syndicate, attributed to the pseudonymous Victor Appleton II, and published in hardcover by Grosset & Dunlap. Most of the books (Titles #5-#7 and #9-#30) were written by James Duncan Lawrence, who had an interest in science and technology and was faithful to the canon of the previous Tom Swift series. Title #7, Tom Swift and His Diving Seacopter, has several references to the first series, including a visit with Mrs. Baggert, who was Tom Sr.'s housekeeper, and other volumes feature a rocket named after the old family retainer Eradicate "Rad" Sampson, a radiation-detector (the Damonscope) named after Tom Sr.'s friend Mr. Damon, and a planetoid named in honor of Tom Swift Sr.'s father Barton. As in the original series, the basic locale is the quaint town of Shopton, New York, on Lake Carlopa.

Typical story elements include Tom's loyal and quip-prone friend Bud Barclay, his comic-relief cook "Chow" Winkler, a spy (typically from Soviet stand-ins Brungaria or Kranjovia), use of a wonder-material called Tomasite, the versatile force-ray repelatron that repelled matter, and atomic-powered vehicles, including the atomicar. The first invention of the series and the one making the most frequent appearances in subsequent stories, the Flying Lab (named Sky Queen), was a giant VTOL research airplane the size of a Boeing 747 jumbo jet.

The Tom Swift Jr. stories had stronger science-fiction elements than the earlier series, particularly in the later volumes. One subplot, beginning on the first page of the first volume and running the length of the series, is Tom's communication, via mathematical "space symbols", with beings from "Planet X". This mystery is never completely resolved, despite the beings sending a sample of life forms from their planet in book #7 and an artificial "energy brain" to occupy a robot body built by Tom in book #17 (see illustration above).

The stories offered science that was more intriguing than accurate. Yet the characters and titles are well-remembered and lovingly regarded, and Apple's Steve Wozniak claims to have been inspired onto his career path by Tom Swift Jr.

== Regular characters from The New Tom Swift Jr. Adventures series ==
- Tom Swift Jr. — The son of Tom Swift Sr. (see below). He is 18 years of age throughout the run of the series, and is described as lanky, blond, crew-cut, possessed of deep-set blue eyes, and closely resembling his famous father. Virtuous, brave, and very very smart. Typically depicted in illustrations as wearing a blue-striped T-shirt and slacks, even under the sea.
- Tom Swift Sr. — The protagonist of the previous series, now married to his longtime sweetheart, Mary. Tom Sr., unlike his own father, is still relatively young and vital at the time of Tom Jr.'s adventures and frequently assists his son from behind the scenes while operating the huge family business, Swift Enterprises.
- Mary Nestor Swift — Tom Sr.'s wife and the mother of Tom Jr. and Sandra. An occasionally fretful, attractive homebody, known for her cooking. Never joins the menfolk on their adventures.
- Sandra "Sandy" Swift — Tom's year-younger sister. Sandy is pert and blond, also headstrong and brave. She is not quite as scientifically focused as her famed brother, toward whom she is less than reverent, though she clearly idolizes him. A trained pilot and aircraft demonstrator.
- Bud Barclay — Tom's best friend, who accompanies Tom on all his adventures. Utterly devoted, and a dependable quipster and sometimes prankster, he is a highly qualified pilot in his own right. He is black-haired, the same age as his pal though a bit shorter and huskier, described as a natural athlete who likes to play for fun. Bud's knowledge of science and engineering is rudimentary, prompting many an explanation by Tom (and thus helpful exposition for the reader). By dating Sandy, he keeps his social life within the world of the Swift family.
- "Uncle" Ned Newton — Tom Sr.'s pal from the previous series and father of Phyllis Newton
- Phyllis Newton — Daughter of Ned Newton and Tom Jr.'s customary social date. Facing death, Tom Jr. declares his love for Phyllis in Tom Swift on the Phantom Satellite.
- Charles "Chow" Winkler — A comic relief character, successor to both Mr. Damon and Rad Sampson. A roly-poly "former chuckwagon cook" born in Texas, he is an older man, beloved for his gaudy western shirts, cowboy hats, bizarre culinary concoctions (like armadillo stew), and for such expressions as "Brand my space biscuits!". He accompanies all Swift expeditions — even in outer space — as the Swifts' executive chef.

The series also offers a good many recurring characters of lesser rank, in contrast to the original series. Most are Swift Enterprises employees, such as Harlan Ames, Phil Radnor, Hank Sterling, Arvid Hanson, Slim Davis, George Dilling, Art Wiltessa, and Miss Trent — the two Toms' office secretary and the lone female among recurring Swift Enterprises characters.

== List of titles ==
1. Tom Swift and His Flying Lab (1954)
2. Tom Swift and His Jetmarine (1954)
3. Tom Swift and His Rocket Ship (1954)
4. Tom Swift and His Giant Robot (1954)
5. Tom Swift and His Atomic Earth Blaster (1954)
6. Tom Swift and His Outpost in Space (1955)
7. Tom Swift and His Diving Seacopter (1956)
8. Tom Swift in the Caves of Nuclear Fire (1956)
9. Tom Swift on the Phantom Satellite (1956)
10. Tom Swift and His Ultrasonic Cycloplane (1957)
11. Tom Swift and His Deep Sea Hydrodome (1958)
12. Tom Swift in the Race to the Moon (1958)
13. Tom Swift and His Space Solartron (1958)
14. Tom Swift and His Electronic Retroscope (1959)
15. Tom Swift and His Spectromarine Selector (1960)
16. Tom Swift and the Cosmic Astronauts (1960)
17. Tom Swift and the Visitor from Planet X (1961)
18. Tom Swift and the Electronic Hydrolung (1961)
19. Tom Swift and His Triphibian Atomicar (1962)
20. Tom Swift and His Megascope Space Prober (1962)
21. Tom Swift and the Asteroid Pirates (1963)
22. Tom Swift and His Repelatron Skyway (1963)
23. Tom Swift and His Aquatomic Tracker (1964)
24. Tom Swift and His 3-D Telejector (1964)
25. Tom Swift and His Polar-Ray Dynasphere (1965)
26. Tom Swift and His Sonic Boom Trap (1965)
27. Tom Swift and His Subocean Geotron (1966)
28. Tom Swift and the Mystery Comet (1966)
29. Tom Swift and the Captive Planetoid (1967)
30. Tom Swift and His G-Force Inverter (1968)
31. Tom Swift and His Dyna-4 Capsule (1969)
32. Tom Swift and His Cosmotron Express (1970)
33. Tom Swift and the Galaxy Ghosts (1971)

The first 17 titles were released in a blue tweed cloth cover with a full color paper jacket. Volumes 1–18 were also published in a blue-spined picture cover edition with Tom Swift and the Electronic Hydrolung (in its first printing only) the only title with the picture cover imprinted directly on the "boards" and wrapping around the spine, rather than as a removable dust jacket. The "blue spine" editions lasted about a year and then the entire run of Tom Swift Jr. books was reproduced in yellow spine versions and all later titles were released in this format. The Hardy Boys books (another series from the Stratemeyer Syndicate) was also released in a blue spine version; this may have prompted the change in color.

A few of the early titles of the Tom Swift Jr. series were re-released in the 1970s in paperback with new illustrations. In 1972, four (#14, #15, #16, and #17) were released as trade paperbacks. #14 was retitled Tom Swift in the Jungle of the Mayas and #15 was renamed Tom Swift and the City of Gold. In 1977, six (#1–4, #6, and #8) were released as mass market paperbacks. One of the stories, #6 Tom Swift and His Outpost in Space was renamed Tom Swift and His Sky Wheel and repositioned as #5.

There exist a number of foreign reprints of Tom Swift Jr. titles, including British, Japanese, Icelandic, and Dutch (#1-3, adapted by the Dutch author Willy van der Heide). There is also a Tom Swift Jr. activity/coloring book and a rare Tom Swift Jr. board game. One episode of the Tom Swift/Linda Craig Mystery hour was aired in 1983, the only one of several proposed Tom Swift versions (including an elaborate "road show" movie) to actually appear before the public. The televised "Tom Swift" was unrelated to the character as depicted in any of the published series.

== Reception ==
Criticism similar to that of the Nancy Drew Mysteries was leveled by writers Anthony Boucher and J. Francis McComas, who found the first installments of the series "a most misguided venture, well below juvenile TV or comic book average in crudity of prose, construction, character and ideas." Nonetheless, the series sold a respectable 6 million copies in its 17-year run, and spawned at least four subsequent Tom Swift series.

== See also ==
- Tom Swift main page
