= Tom Swift and His Motor Cycle =

1910 novel by Victor Appleton

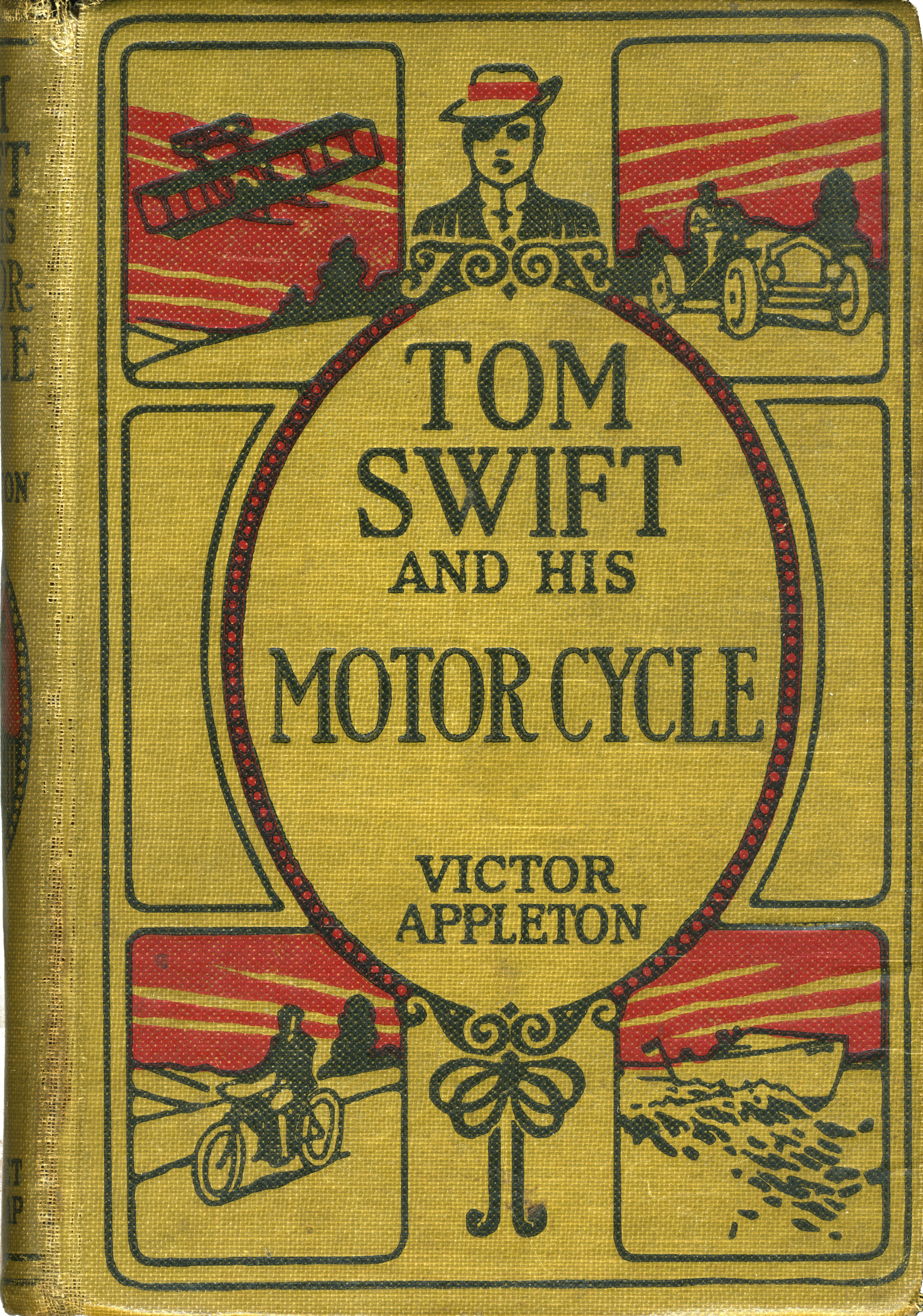
- Author: Victor Appleton
- Original title: Tom Swift and His Motor Cycle, or, Fun and Adventure on the Road
- Language: English
- Series: Tom Swift
- Genre: Young adult novel Adventure novel
- Publisher: Grosset & Dunlap
- Publication date: 1910
- Publication place: United States
- Media type: Print (hardback & paperback)
- Pages: 200+ pp
- Followed by: Tom Swift and His Motor Boat
- Text: Tom Swift and His Motor Cycle at Wikisource

Tom Swift and His Motor Cycle, or, Fun and Adventure on the Road, is Volume 1 in the original Tom Swift novel series published by Grosset & Dunlap.

== Plot summary ==
Tom Swift, in his first adventure, has purchased a motorcycle and immediately gets busy modifying it. Eager to test his enhancements, Tom volunteers to transport his father's revolutionary turbine design plans across the country roads to Albany. Unaware of the evil corporate investors who want to steal the invention for themselves, Tom falls into their trap and finds himself facing the greatest peril of his young life. It is up to Tom not only to retrieve the blueprints and turbine prototype, but also to bring a gang of hired thugs to justice.

== Inventions & innovation ==
A photo of Tesla's own revolutionary turbine.

- Tom purchased a very expensive motorcycle from his new friend, Mr. Damon. The model year would have been 1909 or 1910. Tom tweaked the sprocket ratios, spark levers and overall performance of his machine by 15%, as well as increasing its range.
- Barton Swift, Tom's father, was working on a new turbine design, which would increase performance of motors. Turbines are used all over the world today in the same way. About the same time Barton Swift was working on this design, Nikola Tesla was working to patent his own model - the bladeless turbine, which may have been the basis for Barton's work.

== See also ==
- Curtiss V-8 motorcycle — 1907 record-setter designed and ridden by Glenn Curtiss
