= Tom Swift and His Great Searchlight =

1912 novel by Victor Appleton

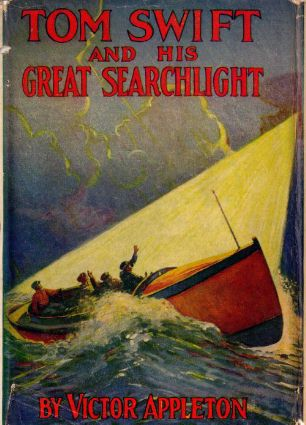
- Author: Victor Appleton
- Original title: Tom Swift and His Great Searchlight, or, On the Border For Uncle Sam
- Language: English
- Series: Tom Swift
- Genre: Young adult novel Adventure novel
- Publisher: Grosset & Dunlap
- Publication date: 1912
- Publication place: United States
- Media type: Print (hardback & paperback)
- Pages: 200+ pp
- ISBN: 978-1515122432
- Preceded by: Tom Swift and His Wizard Camera
- Followed by: Tom Swift and His Giant Cannon
- Text: Tom Swift and His Great Searchlight at Wikisource

Tom Swift and His Great Searchlight, or, On the Border For Uncle Sam, is Volume 15 in the original Tom Swift novel series published by Grosset & Dunlap.

== Plot summary ==
Tom has finally perfected one of his latest inventions, a noiseless airship. This is a project Tom has been working on since the last few volumes, and now that it is finished, it appears that Tom is suddenly under scrutiny by United States border agents, who are tracking smuggling operations which utilize airships to move goods out of Canada, and avoid paying duty tax. Once Tom convinces the agents that he is not involved in smuggling, he is hired to help break up the operations.

== Inventions and innovation ==
In previous volumes, but only mentioned peripherally, Tom has been working on a noiseless airship. These are basically modifications to the engine: a new muffler and sparking device.

Built for use in this adventure is Tom's giant searchlight, as the title of the story suggests. A device utilizing a mixed electric current, the searchlight can be seen for miles and miles, and is used specifically to search for smugglers during the night.

- Tom Swift and His Great Searchlight e-text at Project Gutenberg
