= Croaker =

Croaker may refer to:

- The fish family Sciaenidae
- USS Croaker, a World War II submarine
- Croaker, Virginia, United States, an unincorporated community
- Croaker, a main character in The Black Company science fiction novel series - see The Black Company (novel)
- Croaker, one of Kermit's childhood friends from Kermit's Swamp Years
- Croaker, a type of Tom Swifty pun

== See also ==
- Croker (disambiguation)
