= Tom Swift and His Submarine Boat =

1910 novel by Victor Appleton

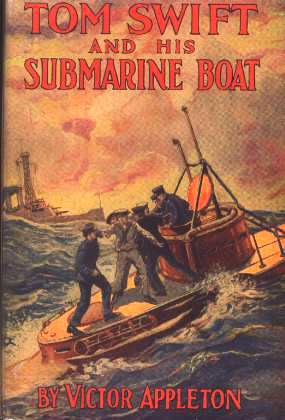
- Author: Victor Appleton
- Original title: Tom Swift and His Submarine Boat, or, Under the Ocean for Sunken Treasure
- Language: English
- Series: Tom Swift
- Genre: Young adult novel Adventure novel
- Publisher: Grosset & Dunlap
- Publication date: 1910
- Publication place: United States
- Media type: Print (hardback & paperback)
- Pages: 200+ pp
- ISBN: 978-1-5148-2567-9
- Preceded by: Tom Swift and His Airship
- Followed by: Tom Swift and His Electric Runabout
- Text: Tom Swift and His Submarine Boat at Wikisource

Tom Swift and His Submarine Boat, or, Under the Ocean for Sunken Treasure, is Volume 4 in the original Tom Swift novel series, written by Victor Appleton and published by Grosset & Dunlap.

== Plot summary ==
Tom Swift's father has been working diligently on a secret project, which he reveals at the beginning of the book as a submarine. With the submarine, named the Advance, he plans to enter a contest for a government prize of $50,000. While in New Jersey to launch the submarine, Tom reads in a newspaper that a ship named the Boldero sank off the coast of Uruguay during a storm, taking down with it the sum of $300,000 in gold bullion.

Tom persuades his father to pursue this treasure as opposed to competing for the government prize. While picking up a hired sea captain, Tom's plans are overheard by a contestant in the government contest, and a rivalry for the treasure begins. The other submarine, named the Wonder, soon sets off to follow Tom and his crew after they embark on their journey.

Tom's crew consists of Tom Swift, his father, Mr. Sharp, Captain West, and Mr. Damon. Each of these take chores on board, including Mr. Damon, who seems to be the cook of the voyage.

The submarines hold up at an island to resupply, and during the night, the Advance tries to slip away from the Wonder. Tom knows that the Wonder and its crew is not certain of the location of the wreck, and is merely following the Advance, hoping to steal the treasure at the last moment.

After the Wonder tries to ram the Advance, Tom and his father take to the heavy underwater cannons, and successfully disable the Wonder, leaving her damaged and immobile. Tom and the Advance seize the opportunity to push ahead.

An engine mishap forces the Advance to surface off the coast of Brazil, where they are soon confronted by the Brazilian battleship São Paulo. Tom and his crew are captured and scheduled to be executed two days later, and the submarine turned over to the Brazilian government. Tom and his friends are held prisoners aboard the battleship.

The night before their execution, a hurricane strikes, and the São Paulo is pushed aground by the winds. The crew take this opportunity to break out and escape, while the battleship's crew are busy trying to save the ship. Using cover from the ship, which is acting as a shield from the waves and winds, Tom's group take to a lifeboat, and escape to the Advance, diving just in time to escape the Brazilian crew of the São Paulo.

It is not long before the Advance arrives at the wreck. They struggle to find it at first, but soon are successful. In their extreme-depth diving suits, Tom and Captain West enter the waters where the wreck is, which is at a depth of over 2 miles—similar to the RMS Titanic. Sharks attack but are fought off.

Gold was found in a secret compartment behind the Captain's safe, and recovered from the Boldero just in time to escape from the now-arriving Wonder. With the $300,000 in gold as a deposit at Tom's local bank in Shopton, the bank considers Tom one of their biggest investors, and with this new power, Tom manages to bring his chum, Ned Newton, a promotion.

== Characters ==
Tom Swift Intrepid inventor and mechanic. Plucky, lively, resourceful, brave and clever. Home-schooled at a college level by his father, Barton Swift. Athlete and hunter. Familiar with how to stalk game and firearms. Loves all things mechanical. Is a decent cook, too.

Barton Swift Widower. Wealthy and conservative. Not flashy or pretentious. Inventor master machinist and holder of numerous patents. In this episode, described as "aged", "nervous", "distracted" and "feeble."

Mrs. Baggert Housekeeper. Kindly, and "loves Tom like a son." Employed by the Swift family since the time Tom's mother died. She is short of stature and has to stand on a soap box to kiss Tom goodbye on one of his voyages.

John Sharp Professional balloonist and trapeze artist. Rescued by Tom when his hot-air balloon gets a bit too hot and burns. Deputy Sheriff as a sideline. Co-designer with Tom, of the Airship, Red Cloud. Tall, thin and 'dark' of complexion, he seems to now have given up speaking in short, choppy sentences, as in the 1st three books. "In residence" with the Swift family, has become sort of hands and feet for Tom's father.

Addison Berg Representative of Bentley & Eagert (B&E), a Philadelphia submarine builder. Industrial spy and all-around bad guy. Hires Andy Foger to cause trouble for Tom.

Garrett Jackson and older (65+ years old) "engineer" who is more handyman/machinist and watchman type. Resides on Swift estate.

Andy Foger Red haired, squinty-eyed bully, who makes great trouble for Tom. "Poor little rich kid", son of wealthy family, born with a chip on his shoulder. Reckless, blustery and angry. Showoff. "Has money, and not much else." Lately has upped ante to attempted murder when he traps Tom in an airtight compartment and leaves him to smother.

Mr. Foger Passing mention that he is on the Board of Directors of B&E.

Eradicate Andrew Jackson Abraham Lincoln Sampson, A.K.A. "Rad" Aged stereotypical Negro journeyman jack-of-all-trades. Chicken-coop cleaner and whitewasher. "Eradicates dirt." Also makes a living mowing grass, and sawing wood. Gives the appearance of being lazy but is actually a hard worker and entrepreneur/wheeler-dealer. Heavy deep-south accent and Uncle Remus attitude. Caretaker of mule Boomerang. In this tome, is limited to acting as estate watchman while the Swifts are voyaging.

Sam Snedecker Cohort of Andy Foger. Voice of reason to Andy's scream of rage. No description given. Could be an OK guy if he were to stop associating with Andy Foger.

Pete Bailey Cohort and willing minion of Andy Foger. No description given. Generic bad guy.

Ned Newton Chum and companion of Tom, currently employed in Shopton National Bank. Ned has only a passing role in this tome.

Mr. Wakefield Damon Elderly and eccentric adventurer whose main purpose in life seems to be blessing everybody and everything near his person. In this episode, he is "fond of good living." He had graduated from cycles to automobiles. In spite of ongoing trouble mastering most any conveyance he tries to control, has successfully piloted an airship.

Mr. Maxwell Minion of Addison Berg.

Mr. Bentley Bentley of Bentley & Eagert Subs Inc. Employer of Addison Berg. Bad guy.

Unnamed Hotel Clerk Walk-on part. Single characteristic noted was a pinkie ring "with a large diamond." Hotels must pay well on the Jersey shore...

Captain Alden Weston Soft-spoken and mild-mannered sea captain hired by Swifts to navigate their sub to the South Atlantic. World traveler and soldier of fortune. Described as smooth of face and with merry blue eyes. Main characteristic is diffident, self-effacing language. Ends nearly every sentence with "if you don't mind" or "if I may say so" or variations of same.

Admiral Fanchetti Commander of Brazilian cruiser San Paulo. Much absorbed with gold braid and bluster. Also able to leap to false conclusions with a single bound. Adept at passing out death sentences.

Lieutenant Drascalo Fanchetti's hatchet-man, possibly XO. His dialogue is largely limited to shouting "Silenceo!" at every opportunity.

== Inventions and innovation ==
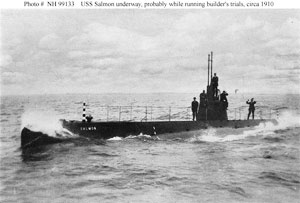
1910 era submarine similar in form - but smaller - than Barton Swift's submarine.

- Barton Swift, Tom's father, has designed an innovative submarine - The Advance - that can outperform anything even the government has in its arsenal. At 100 ft from nose to stern, and 20 ft at the beam, the submarine has a triple layered hull (which can handle depths of more than three miles). It runs normally on gasoline, but also has the advantage of a hydrodynamic drive for auxiliary and silent propulsion. The craft is armed with electric cannons both at the rear and fore of the ship as well as a ram on the prow, should it come to the worst. There are many rooms, both luxurious and well-appointed, including a lounge, bedrooms, and, of course, an airlock through which the crew can exit when exploring the ocean floor in their specially designed deep-water diving suits.
