= Tom Swift in the Caves of Ice =

1911 novel by Victor Appleton

- Author: Victor Appleton
- Original title: Tom Swift in the Caves of Ice, or, The Wreck of the Airship
- Language: English
- Series: Tom Swift
- Genre: Young adult novel Adventure novel
- Publisher: Grosset & Dunlap
- Publication date: 1911
- Publication place: United States
- Media type: Print (hardback & paperback)
- Pages: 200+ pp
- ISBN: 978-1514825693
- Preceded by: Tom Swift Among the Diamond Makers
- Followed by: Tom Swift and His Sky Racer
- Text: Tom Swift in the Caves of Ice at Wikisource

Tom Swift in the Caves of Ice, or, The Wreck of the Airship, is Volume 8 in the original Tom Swift novel series published by Grosset & Dunlap.

== Plot summary ==
Tom Swift & friends journey to the Arctic in his custom airship to seek for the legendary Valley of Gold. When his map is stolen by his longtime nemesis, Andy Foger, who has himself built a competing airship, the race is on across frigid Alaska to see who will be the first to find the limitless fortune.

== Inventions & innovation ==
Another story where no major invention is produced by Tom. He did create a special new lifting gas for his airship, needed to overcome the atmospheric problems they may encounter in the Arctic North. As a side-invention, Tom has been working on a new electric rifle, but it is not properly introduced in this story.
