= Tom Swift and His Giant Cannon =

1913 novel by Victor Appleton

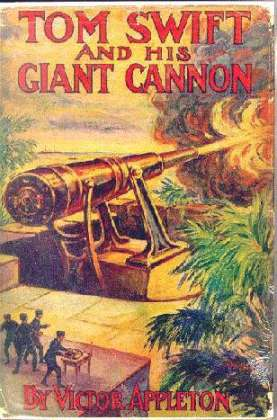
- Author: Victor Appleton
- Original title: Tom Swift and His Giant Cannon, or, The Longest Shots on Record
- Language: English
- Series: Tom Swift
- Genre: Young adult novel Adventure novel
- Publisher: Grosset & Dunlap
- Publication date: 1913
- Publication place: United States
- Media type: Print (hardback & paperback)
- Pages: 200+ pp
- Preceded by: Tom Swift and His Great Searchlight
- Followed by: Tom Swift and His Photo Telephone
- Text: Tom Swift and His Giant Cannon at Wikisource

Tom Swift and His Giant Cannon, or, The Longest Shots on Record, is Volume 16 in the original Tom Swift novel series published by Grosset & Dunlap.

== Plot summary ==
The story opens with a discussion between Barton Swift and an old friend, Alec Peterson. Alec is trying to convince Mr. Swift to finance an expedition to locate a hidden opal mine, but Mr. Swift is reluctant. In the middle of the conversation, Tom is flying one of his airships, but gets tangled up in power lines. Mr. Peterson cuts the wires, saving Tom's life. Tom is so grateful to Mr. Peterson that Tom is willing to finance the expedition himself.

In the meanwhile, the story segues to Tom's next invention, a cannon bigger than any that has been built to date. Tom hopes to sell his invention to the United States government, for use in protecting the Panama Canal, which was still under active construction at the time of the story.

== Inventions & Innovation ==
The cannon Tom invents is the largest gun to date. Measuring 100 feet in length, it has a 30-inch caliber, and Tom estimates he can launch a 2 ton projectile 30 miles.

- Tom Swift and His Giant Cannon e-text at Project Gutenberg
