= Ribbit =

Ribbit may refer to:

- Onomatopoeia for the sound that a frog makes.
- Ribbit (Pillow Pal), a plush toy frog made by Ty, Inc.
- Ribbit (telecommunications company), a telecommunications company based in Mountain View, California, acquired by BT Group in 2008
- Ribbit, 2010 Flash game by Nitrome
- Ribbit (film), a 2014 animated film
- The charging of forbidden loans and interest in Judaism
- Ribbit, a character in The Amazing Digital Circus
- Ribbit (game), a 2004 board game

== See also ==
- Croak (disambiguation)
- Rib (disambiguation)
- Rip It
