= Jack Cover =

American inventor of the Taser (1920–2009)

John Higson Cover Jr.
- Born: John Higson Cover; April 6, 1920; New York City, U.S.
- Died: February 7, 2009 (aged 88); Mission Viejo, California, U.S.
- Other names: Jack Cover
- Known for: Invention of taser
- Spouse: Ginny
- Children: 5

John Higson Cover Jr. (April 6, 1920 – February 7, 2009) was an American aerospace scientist who invented the taser stun gun.

== Biography ==
Jack Cover was born in New York City on April 6, 1920, and grew up in Chicago. His father was a professor of economics. His mother earned a mathematics master's degree at the University of Chicago. Cover earned a bachelor's degree and a doctorate in nuclear physics at the same university, studying under Enrico Fermi. During World War II, he was an Army Air Force test pilot. He later worked at the Naval Air Weapons Station China Lake. He was a scientist at North American Aviation from 1952 until 1964 and also worked for NASA (Apollo program), IBM and Hughes Aircraft.

In 1970, he formed Taser Systems, Inc., named for a Tom Swift novel about the Thomas A. Swift's Electric Rifle. Because the Taser used gunpowder to launch the darts, the federal government considered it a firearm, a classification that ruled out a civilian market and also discouraged police and military sales.

=== Private life ===
Cover was married three times; the first two ended in divorce. His last marriage was to Ginny. He had five children, two sons and three daughters. He had Alzheimer's disease, and died of pneumonia on February 7, 2009, at the Golden West Retirement Home in Mission Viejo, California.

== Patents ==
- U.S. patent 3,803,463 July 10, 1972; Weapon for Immobilization and Capture

== See also ==
- Cattle prod
- Robert J. Kleberg (King Ranch)
