= Tom Swift =

Fictional literary character

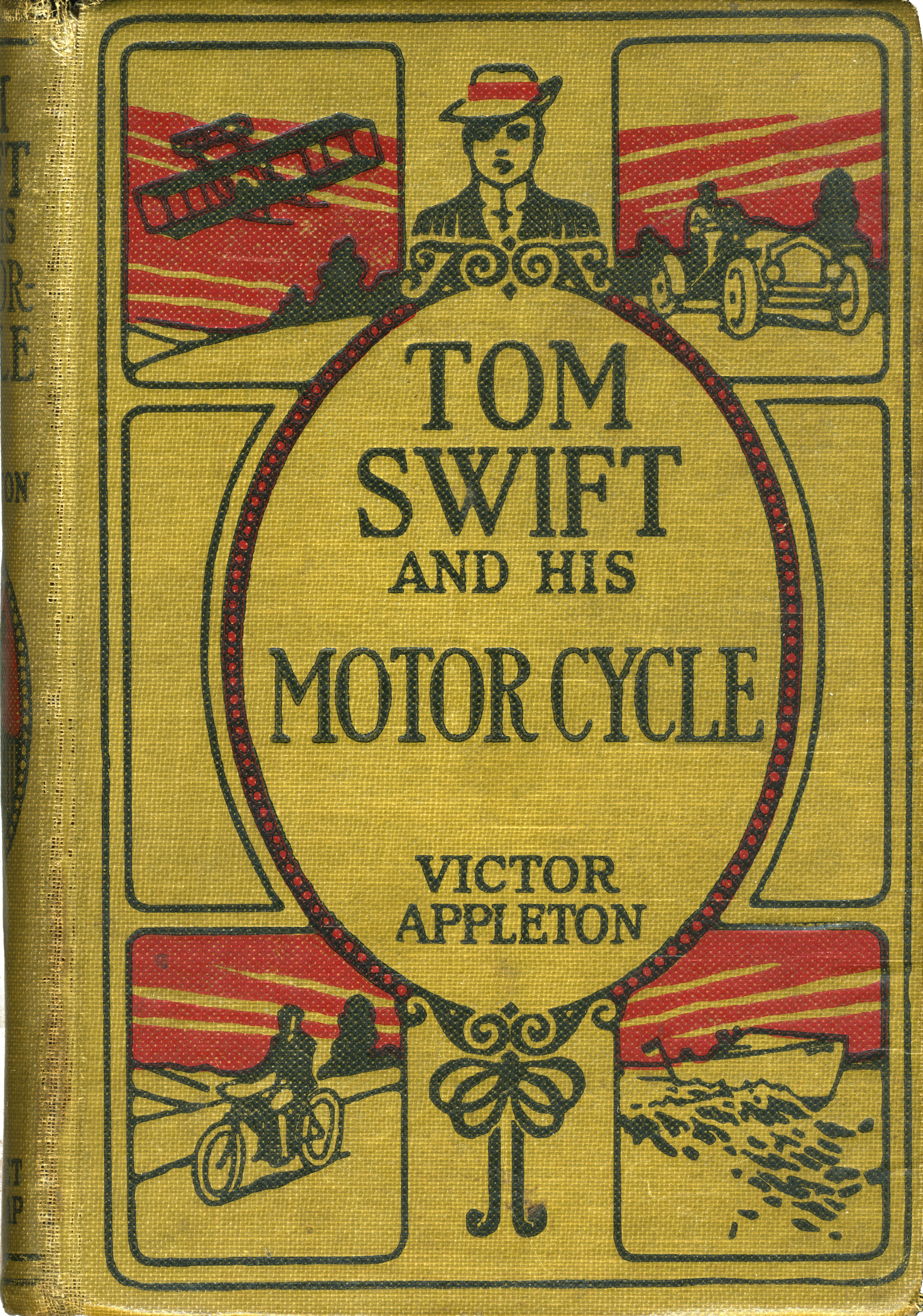
Tom Swift and His Motor Cycle (1910), the first Tom Swift book

Tom Swift is the main character of six series of American juvenile science fiction and adventure novels that emphasize science, invention, and technology. Inaugurated in 1910, the sequence of series comprises more than 100 volumes. The first Tom Swift – later, Tom Swift Sr. – was created by Edward Stratemeyer, the founder of the Stratemeyer Syndicate, a book packaging firm. Tom's adventures have been written by various ghostwriters, beginning with Howard Garis. Most of the books are credited to the collective pseudonym "Victor Appleton". The 33 volumes of the second series use the pseudonym Victor Appleton II for the author. For this series, and some later ones, the main character is "Tom Swift Jr." New titles have been published again from 2019 after a gap of about ten years, roughly the time that has passed before every resumption. Most of the series emphasized Tom's inventions. The books generally describe the effects of science and technology as wholly beneficial, and the role of the inventor in society as admirable and heroic.

Translated into many languages, the books have sold more than 30 million copies worldwide. Tom Swift has also been the subject of a board game and several attempted adaptations into other media.

Tom Swift has been cited as an inspiration by various scientists and inventors, including aircraft designer Kelly Johnson.

== Inventions ==
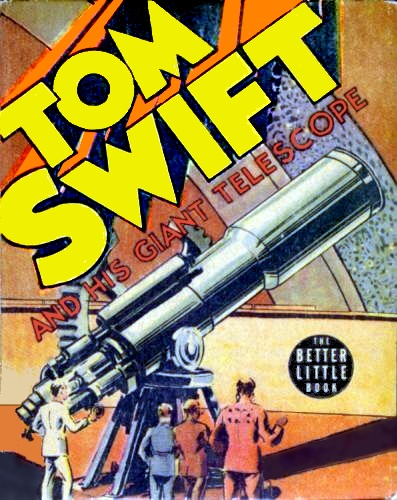
Tom Swift and His Giant Telescope (1939), from the original Tom Swift series

In his various incarnations, Tom Swift, usually a teenager, is inventive and science-minded, "Swift by name and swift by nature." Tom is portrayed as a natural genius. In the earlier series, he is said to have had little formal education, the character modeled originally after such inventors as Henry Ford, Thomas Edison, and aviation pioneers Glenn Curtiss and Alberto Santos-Dumont. For most of the six series, each book concerns Tom's latest invention, and its role either in solving a problem or mystery, or in assisting Tom in feats of exploration or rescue. Often Tom must protect his new invention from villains "intent on stealing Tom's thunder or preventing his success," but Tom is always successful in the end.

Many of Tom Swift's fictional inventions describe actual technological developments or predate technologies now considered commonplace. Tom Swift Among the Diamond Makers (1911) was based on Charles Parsons's attempts to synthesize diamonds using electric current. Tom Swift and His Photo Telephone was published in 1914. Sending photographs by telephone was not fully developed until 1925. Tom Swift and His Wizard Camera (1912) features a portable movie camera, not invented until 1923. Tom Swift and His Electric Locomotive (1922) was published two years before the Central Railroad of New Jersey began using the first diesel electric locomotive. The house on wheels that Tom invents for 1929's Tom Swift and His House on Wheels pre-dated the first house trailer by a year. Tom Swift and His Diving Seacopter (1952) features a flying submarine similar to one planned by the United States Department of Defense four years later in 1956. Other inventions of Tom's have not happened, such as the device for silencing airplane engines that he invents in Tom Swift and His Magnetic Silencer (1941).

== Authorship ==
The character of Tom Swift was conceived about 1910 by Edward Stratemeyer, founder of the Stratemeyer Syndicate, a book-packaging business, although the name "Tom Swift" was first used in 1903 by Stratemeyer in Shorthand Tom the Reporter; Or, the Exploits of a Bright Boy. Stratemeyer invented the series to capitalize on the market for children's science adventures. The Syndicate's authors created the Tom Swift stories by first preparing an outline with the plot elements, followed by drafting and editing the detailed manuscript. The books were published using the house pseudonym "Victor Appleton". Howard Garis wrote most of the volumes of the original series; Stratemeyer's daughter, Harriet Stratemeyer Adams, wrote the last three volumes. The first Tom Swift series ended in 1941.

In 1954, Harriet Adams created the Tom Swift, Jr. series, which was published using the pseudonym "Victor Appleton II" as author. The main character Tom Swift, Junior, was described as the son of the original Tom Swift. Most of the stories were outlined and plotted by Adams. The texts were written by various writers, among them William Dougherty, John Almquist, Richard Sklar, James Duncan Lawrence, Tom Mulvey and Richard McKenna. The Tom Swift, Jr., series ended in 1971.

A third series was begun in 1981 and lasted until 1984. The rights to the Tom Swift character, along with the Stratemeyer Syndicate, were sold in 1984 to publishers Simon & Schuster. They hired New York City book packaging business Mega-Books to produce further series. Simon & Schuster has published three more Tom Swift series: one from 1991 to 1993; Tom Swift, Young Inventor from 2006 to 2007; and Tom Swift Inventors' Academy from 2019 to present—eight volumes as of Depth Perception (March 2022).

== Series ==
The longest-running series of books to feature Tom Swift is the first, which consists of 40 volumes. Tom's son (Tom Swift Jr.) was also the name of the protagonist of the 33 volumes of the Tom Swift Jr. Adventures, the 11 volumes of the third Tom Swift series, the 13 volumes of the fourth, and 6 more for the fifth series, Tom Swift, Young Inventor, and 8 for the most recent series, Tom Swift Inventors' Academy for a total of 111 volumes for all the series. In addition to publication in the United States, Tom Swift books have been published extensively in England, and translated into Norwegian, French, Icelandic, and Finnish.

=== Original series (1910–1941) ===
"All right, Dad. Go ahead, laugh."

"Well, Tom, I'm not exactly laughing at you ... it's more at the idea than anything else. The idea of talking over a wire and, at the same time, having light waves, as well as electrical waves passing over the same conductors!"

"All right, Dad. Go ahead and laugh. I don't mind," said Tom, good-naturedly. "Folks laughed at Bell, when he said he could send a human voice over a copper string ..."

— Tom Swift and His Photo Telephone (1912)

In the original series, Tom Swift lives in fictional Shopton, New York. He is the son of Barton Swift, the founder of the Swift Construction Company. Tom's mother is deceased, but the housekeeper, Mrs. Baggert, functions as a surrogate mother. Tom usually shares his adventures with close friend Ned Newton, who eventually becomes the Swift Construction Company's financial manager. For most of the series, Tom dates Mary Nestor. It has been suggested that his eventual marriage to Mary led to the series' demise, as young boys found a married man harder to identify with than a young, single one; however, after the 1929 marriage the series continued for 12 more years and eight further volumes. Regularly appearing characters include Wakefield Damon, an older man, whose dialogue is characterized by frequent use of such whimsical expressions as "Bless my brakeshoes!" and "Bless my vest buttons!"

The original Tom Swift has been claimed to represent the early 20th-century conception of inventors. Tom has no formal education after high school; according to critic Robert Von der Osten, Tom's ability to invent is presented as "somehow innate". Tom is not a theorist but a tinkerer and, later, an experimenter who, with his research team, finds practical applications for others' research; Tom does not so much methodically develop and perfect inventions as find them by trial and error.

Tom's inventions are not at first innovative. In the first two books of the series, he fixes a motorcycle and a boat, and in the third book he develops an airship, but only with the help of a balloonist. Tom is also at times unsure of himself, asking his elders for help; as Von der Osten puts it, "the early Tom Swift is more dependent on his father and other adults at first and is much more hesitant in his actions. When his airship bangs into a tower, Tom is uncharacteristically nonplussed and needs support." However, as the series progresses, Tom's inventions "show an increasingly independent genius as he develops devices, such as an electric rifle and a photo telephone, further removed from the scientific norm". Some of Tom's inventions are improvements of then-current technologies, while other inventions were not in development at the time the books were published, but have since been developed.

=== Second series (1954–1971) ===
"Did you have time to learn anything?" Bud asked the young inventor.

Tom shrugged. "A little. I was using my new gadget as a wave trap or antenna to capture light of a single wave length from certain stars so I could study their red shift."

— From Tom Swift and His Polar-Ray Dynasphere (1965).

In this series, presented as an extension and continuation of the first, the Tom Swift of the original series is now the CEO of Swift Enterprises, a four-mile-square enclosed facility where inventions are conceived and manufactured. Tom's son, Tom Swift Jr., is now the primary inventive genius of the family. Stratemeyer Syndicate employee Andrew Svenson described the new series as based "on scientific fact and probability, whereas the old Toms were in the main adventure stories mixed with pseudo-science". Three PhDs in science were hired as consultants to the series to ensure scientific accuracy. The younger Tom does not tinker with motorcycles; his inventions and adventures extend from deep within the Earth (in Tom Swift and His Atomic Earth Blaster [1954]) to the bottom of the ocean (in Tom Swift and His Diving Seacopter [1956]) to the Moon (in Tom Swift in the Race to the Moon [1958]) and, eventually, the outer Solar System (in Tom Swift and His Cosmotron Express [1970]). Later volumes of the series increasingly emphasized the extraterrestrial "space friends", as they are termed throughout the series. The beings appear as early as the first volume of the series, Tom Swift and His Flying Lab (1954). The Tom Swift Jr., Adventures were less commercially successful than the first series, selling 6 million copies total, compared with sales of 14 million copies for the first series.

In contrast to the earlier series, many of Tom Jr.'s inventions are designed to operate in space, and his "genius is unequivocally original as he constructs nuclear-powered flying labs, establishes outposts in space, or designs ways to sail in space on cosmic rays". Unlike his father, Tom Jr. is not just a tinkerer; he relies on scientific and mathematical theories, and, according to critic Robert Von der Osten, "science [in the books] is, in fact, understood to be a set of theories that are developed based on experimentation and scientific discussion. Rather than being opposed to technological advances, such a theoretical understanding becomes essential to invention."

Tom Swift Jr.'s Cold War-era adventures and inventions are often motivated by patriotism, as Tom repeatedly defeats the evil agents of the fictional nations "Kranjovia" and "Brungaria", the latter a place that critic Francis Molson describes as "a vaguely Eastern European country, which is strongly opposed to the Swifts and the U.S. Hence, the Swifts' opposition to and competition with the Brungarians is both personal and patriotic."

=== Third series (1981–1984) ===
The third Tom Swift series differs from the first two in that the setting is primarily outer space, although Swift Enterprises (located now in New Mexico) is occasionally mentioned. Tom Swift explores the universe in the starship Exedra, using a faster-than-light drive he has reverse-engineered from an alien space probe. He is aided by Benjamin Franklin Walking Eagle, a Native American who is Tom's co-pilot, best friend, and an expert computer technician, and Anita Thorwald, a former rival of Tom's who now works with him as a technician and whose right leg has been rebuilt to contain a miniature computer.

This series maintains only an occasional and vague continuity with the two previous series. Tom is called the son of "the great Tom Swift" and said to be "already an important and active contributor to the family business, the giant multimillion-dollar scientific-industrial complex known as Swift Enterprises". However, as critic Francis Molson indicates, it is not explained whether this Tom Swift is the grandson of the famous Tom Swift of the first series or still the Tom Swift Jr. of the second.

The Tom Swift of this third series is less of an inventor than his predecessors, and his inventions are rarely the main feature of the plot. Still, according to Molson, "Tom the inventor is not ignored. Perhaps the most impressive of his inventions and the one essential to the series as a whole is the robot he designs and builds, Aristotle, which becomes a winning and likeable character in its own right." The books are slower-paced than the Tom Swift Jr. adventures of the second series, and include realistic, colloquial dialogue. Each volume begins where the last one ended, and the technology is plausible and accurate.

=== Fourth series (1991–1993) ===
The fourth series featuring Tom Swift (again a "Jr.") is set mostly on Earth (with occasional voyages to the Moon); Swift Enterprises is now located in California. In the first book, The Black Dragon, it's mentioned that Tom is the son of Tom Swift Sr. and Mary Nestor. The books deal with what Richard Pyle describes as "modern and futuristic concepts" and, as in the third series, feature an ethnically diverse cast of characters.

Like the Tom Swift Jr. series, the series portrays Tom as a scientist as well as an inventor whose inventions depend on a knowledge of theory. The series differs from previous versions of the character, however, in that Tom's inventive genius is portrayed as problematic and sometimes dangerous. As Robert Von der Osten argues, Tom's inventions for this series often have unexpected and negative repercussions.

a device to create a miniature black hole which casts him into an alternative universe; a device that trains muscles but also distorts the mind of the user; and a genetic process which, combined with the effect of his black hole, results in a terrifying devolution. Genius here begins to recapitulate earlier myths of the mad scientist whose technological and scientific ambitions are so out of harmony with nature and contemporary science that the results are usually unfortunate.

The series features more violence than previous series; in The Negative Zone, Tom blows up a motel room to escape the authorities.

There was a derivative of this series featuring Tom Swift and the Hardy Boys called A Hardy Boys & Tom Swift Ultra Thriller that was published from 1992 to 1993, and only had two volumes released. Both books dealt with science fictional topics (time travel and aliens landing on earth).

=== Fifth series (2006–2007) ===
The fifth series, Tom Swift, Young Inventor, returns Tom Swift to Shopton, New York, with Tom as the son of Tom Swift and Mary Nestor, the names of characters of the original Tom Swift series. The series features inventions that are close to current technology "rather than ultra-futuristic". In several of the books, Tom's antagonist is The Road Back (TRB), an anti-technology terrorist organization. Tom's personal nemesis is Andy Foger, teenage son of his father's former business partner who now owns a competing (and ethically dubious) high-technology company.

=== Sixth series (2019–2022) ===
A sixth series, Tom Swift Inventors' Academy, published by Simon and Schuster, debuted in July 2019 with #1 The Drone Pursuit and #2 The Sonic Breach. A total of eight books were published, concluding with #8 Depth Perception in March 2022.

== Other media ==
Parker Brothers produced a Tom Swift board game in 1966, although it was never widely distributed, and the character has appeared in one television show. Various Tom Swift radio programs, television series, and movies were planned and even written, but were either never produced or not released.

=== Film and television ===
==== Cancelled films ====
As early as 1914, Edward Stratemeyer proposed making a Tom Swift movie, but no such movie was made. A Tom Swift radio series was proposed in 1946. Two scripts were written, but, for unknown reasons, the series was never produced. Twentieth Century Fox planned a Tom Swift feature movie in 1968, to be directed by Gene Kelly. A script was written and approved, and filming was to have begun during 1969. However, the project was canceled owing to the poor reception of the movies Doctor Dolittle and Star!; a $500,000 airship that had been built as a prop was rumored to have been sold to a midwest amusement park. Yet another movie was planned in 1974, but, again, was cancelled.

==== Television ====
Scripts were written for a proposed television series involving both Tom Swift Jr. and his father, the hero of the original book series. A television pilot show for a series to be called The Adventures of Tom Swift was filmed in 1958, featuring Gary Vinson. However, legal problems prevented the pilot's distribution, and it was never broadcast; no copies of the pilot are known to exist, though the pilot script is available. In 1977, Glen A. Larson wrote an unproduced television pilot show entitled "TS, I Love You: The Further Adventures of Tom Swift". This series was to be combined with a Nancy Drew series, a Hardy Boys series, and a Dana Girls series. Nancy Drew and the Hardy Boys were eventually combined into a one-hour program The Hardy Boys/Nancy Drew Mysteries with alternating episodes.

A Tom Swift media project finally came to fruition in 1983 when Willie Aames appeared as Tom Swift along with Lori Loughlin as Linda Craig in a television special, The Tom Swift and Linda Craig Mystery Hour, which was broadcast on July 3. It was a ratings failure. In 2007, digital studio Worldwide Biggies acquired movie rights to Tom Swift and announced plans to release a feature film and video game, followed by a television series. As of 2015, these plans had not come to fruition.

Tom Swift appeared in the episode "The Celestial Visitor" from the second season of The CW's Nancy Drew with Tian Richards portraying the character as a black, gay, billionaire inventor. The episode is a backdoor pilot for a spin-off project titled Tom Swift, in development at The CW. In August 2021, Tom Swift was ordered straight-to-series and premiered on May 31, 2022 on The CW. In February 2022, Ashleigh Murray joined the cast as Zenzi Fullington. Due to poor ratings, the series was cancelled on June 30 that year.

== Depiction of race ==
Tom Swift and His Electric Rifle (published 1911) depicts Africans as brutish, uncivilized animals, and the white protagonist as their paternal savior.

In the book, the black people are rendered as either passive, simple and childlike, or animalistic and capable of unimaginable violence. They are described in the book at various points as "hideous in their savagery, wearing only the loin cloth, and with their kinky hair stuck full of sticks", and as "wild, savage and ferocious ... like little red apes".

— Jamiles Lartey

== Cultural influence ==
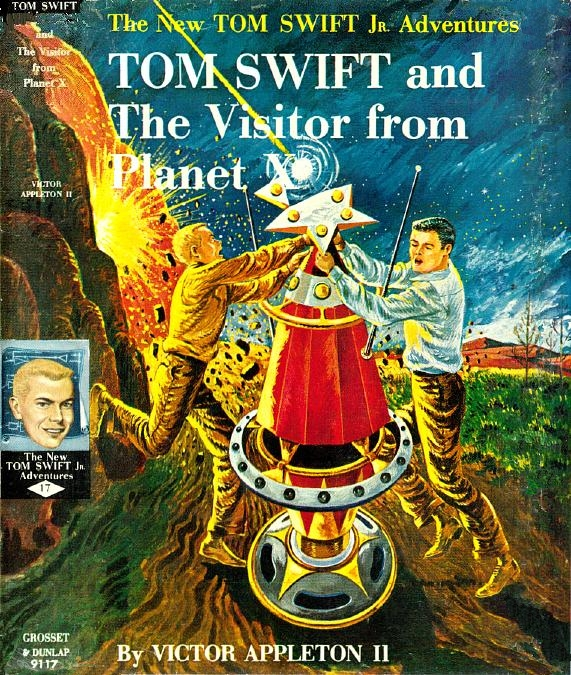
Cover of Tom Swift and the Visitor from Planet X (1961), from the Tom Swift, Jr. Adventure Series

The Tom Swift books have been credited with assisting the success of American science fiction and with establishing the edisonade (stories focusing on brilliant scientists and inventors) as a basic cultural myth. Tom Swift's adventures have been popular since the character's inception in 1910: by 1914, 150,000 copies a year were being sold and a 1929 study found the series to be second in popularity only to the Bible for boys in their early teens. By 2009, Tom Swift books had sold more than 30 million copies worldwide. The success of Tom Swift also paved the way for other Stratemeyer creations, such as The Hardy Boys and Nancy Drew.

The series' writing style, which was sometimes adverb heavy, suggested a name for a type of adverbial pun promulgated during the 1950s and 1960s, a type of wellerism known as "Tom Swifties". Originally this kind of pun was called a "Tom Swiftly" in reference to the adverbial usage. Over time, it has come to be called a "Tom Swifty". Some examples are "'I lost my crutches,' said Tom lamely", and "'I'll take the prisoner downstairs', said Tom condescendingly."

Tom Swift's fictional inventions have apparently inspired several actual inventions, among them Lee Felsenstein's "Tom Swift Terminal", which "drove the creation of an early personal computer known as the Sol", and the taser. The name "taser" was originally "TSER", for "Tom Swift's Electric Rifle". The invention was named for the central device in the story Tom Swift and His Electric Rifle (1911); according to inventor Jack Cover, "an 'A' was added because we got tired of answering the phone 'TSER'."

A number of scientists, inventors, and science fiction writers have also credited Tom Swift with inspiring them, including Ray Kurzweil, Robert A. Heinlein, and Isaac Asimov. Gone with the Wind author Margaret Mitchell was also known to have read the first series as a child. Filmmaker George Lucas shows the 16-year-old Indiana Jones reading a Tom Swift novel — and the author Edward Stratemeyer himself appearing as a character — in the episode Spring Break Adventure of the television series Young Indiana Jones.

The Tom Swift Jr. series was also a source of inspiration to many. Scientist and television presenter Bill Nye said the books helped "make me who I am", and they inspired him to launch his own young adult series. Microsoft founders Paul Allen and Bill Gates also read the books as children, as did co-founder of competing company Apple, Steve Wozniak. Wozniak, who cited the series as his inspiration to become a scientist, said the books made him feel "that engineers can save the world from all sorts of conflict and evil".

== See also ==
- List of Tom Swift books
- Danny Dunn

== Cited sources ==
- Appleton, Victor (1981). The City in the Stars. New York: Simon & Schuster. ISBN 978-0-671-41115-2.
- Appleton II, Victor (1965). Tom Swift and His Polar-Ray Dynasphere. New York: Grosset & Dunlap.
- Bleiler, Everett Franklin; Richard Bleiler (1990). Science-fiction, the early years: a full description of more than 3,000 science-fiction stories from earliest times to the appearance of the genre magazines in 1930 : with author, title, and motif indexes. Ohio: Kent State University Press. ISBN 978-0-87338-416-2.
- Burt, Daniel S (2004). The chronology of American literature: America's literary achievements from the colonial era to modern times. New York: Houghton Mifflin Harcourt. ISBN 978-0-618-16821-7.
- Carter, R.J. (22 June 2006). "Book Review: Into the Abyss (Tom Swift, Young Inventor #1)". The Trades. Burlee LLC. Archived from the original on October 6, 2007.
- "Chip off the Old Block". Time Magazine. January 4, 1954.
- Davis, William A (June 12, 1991). "Boy inventor moves Swiftly into the '90s". The Boston Globe. Boston, MA. p. 73. Archived from the original on March 13, 2016 – via HighBeam Research.
- Disch, Thomas M (December 21, 2007). "Book Review: Tom Swift: The Negative Zone". Entertainment Weekly.
- Dizer, John T (1982). Tom Swift & Company. Jefferson, North Carolina: McFarland Publishing. ISBN 978-0-89950-024-9.
- Erardi, Glenn (13 December 2008). "Porcelains are 'Piano Babies'". The Berkshire Eagle (Pittsfield, MA). Accessed through Access World News on May 23, 2009.
- Fowler, Elizabeth M. (9 September 1962). "Personality: Bookkeeper Now a Publisher". The New York Times, p. 159. Accessed through ProQuest Historical Newspapers on May 23, 2009.
- Hayes, Dade (November 26, 2007). "Worldwide scoops up 'Tom Swift': Hecht's studio nabs rights to entire book series". Variety.
- Hazen, Robert (1999). The Diamond Makers. Cambridge: Cambridge University Press. ISBN 978-0-521-65474-6.
- Johnson, Deidre (1982). Stratemeyer Pseudonyms and Series Books. California: Greenwood Press. ISBN 978-0-313-22632-8.
- Keeline, James D. "Tom Swift on the Silver Screen" (PDF). Archived from the original (PDF) on September 7, 2008.
- Keeline, James D (January 21, 2012). "Tom Swift film attempt of 1966–69 and a few others before and after". Yahoo! Groups: Tom-Swift.
- Kendall, Martha (2000). Steve Wozniak: Inventor of the Apple Computer. California: Highland Publishing Group. ISBN 978-0-945783-08-4.
- Kurzweil, Ray (2005). The singularity is near: when humans transcend biology. New York: Viking. ISBN 978-0-670-03384-3.
- Landon, Brooks (2002). Science fiction after 1900: from the steam man to the stars. New York: Routledge. ISBN 978-0-415-93888-4.
- Linzmayer, Owen (2004). Apple confidential 2.0: the definitive history of the world's most colorful company. California: No Starch Press. ISBN 978-1-59327-010-0.
- Molson, Francis J (1999). Sullivan, Charles William (ed.). "American Technological Fiction for Youth: 1900–1940" in Young Adult Science Fiction. California: Greenwood Press. ISBN 978-0-313-28940-8.
- Molson, Francis J (Summer 1985). "Three Generations of Tom Swift". Children's Literature Association Quarterly. 10 (2): 60–63. doi:10.1353/chq.0.0612. ISSN 0885-0429. S2CID 144296755.
- Nitrozac, Snaggy (2003). The Best of the Joy of Tech. California: O'Reilly. ISBN 978-0-596-00578-8.
- Pilkington, Ed (May 2, 2009). "The future is going to be very exciting". Mail & Guardian Online. p. 32.
- Plunkett-Powell, Karen (1993). The Nancy Drew Scrapbook: 60 years of America's favorite teenage sleuth. New York: St. Martin's Press. ISBN 978-0-312-09881-0.
- Prager, Arthur (December 1976). "Bless my collar button, if it isn't Tom Swift, the world's greatest inventor". American Heritage. 28 (1): 64.
- Prager, Arthur (1971). Rascals at Large, or, The Clue in the Old Nostalgia. New York: Doubleday. ISBN 99974-860-7-2. OCLC 200980.
- Pyle, Richard (16 August 1991). "Tom Swift tries to reinvent appeal". The Tampa Tribune, p. 1. Accessed through Access World News on May 23, 2009.
- "Season for Swifties". Time Magazine. May 31, 1963. Archived from the original on December 22, 2008.
- Sullivan, Charles William (1999). Sullivan, Charles William (ed.). "American Young Adult Science Fiction Since 1947" in Young Adult Science Fiction. California: Greenwood Press. ISBN 978-0-313-28940-8.
- Sun Wire Services (February 14, 2009). "Taser inventor dies at 88". The Toronto Sun. p. 17. Archived from the original on March 12, 2016.
- "Tom Swift, Master Inventor". St. Petersburg Times. March 19, 1956.
- Turner, Fred (2006). From counterculture to cyberculture: Stewart Brand, the Whole Earth Network, and the rise of digital utopianism. Chicago: University of Chicago Press. ISBN 978-0-226-81741-5.
- Von der Osten, Robert (April 2004). "Four Generations of Tom Swift: Ideology in Juvenile Science Fiction". The Lion and the Unicorn. 28 (2): 268–283. doi:10.1353/uni.2004.0023. S2CID 201746322.
