= Victor Appleton =

House pseudonym used by the Stratemeyer Syndicate

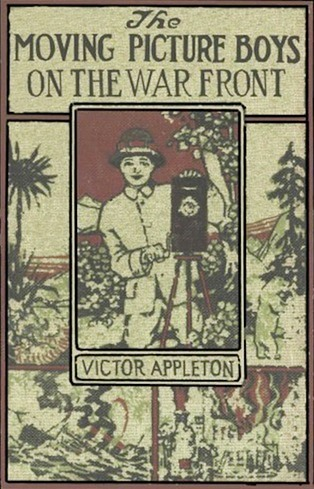
Cover of The Moving Picture Boys on the War Front

Victor Appleton was a house pseudonym used by the Stratemeyer Syndicate and its successors, most famous for being associated with the Tom Swift series of books.

The following series have been published under the Victor Appleton and Victor Appleton II names:

- Tom Swift, 1910–1941
- Motion Picture Chums, 1913–1916
- Moving Picture Boys, 1913–1922
- Movie Boys, 1926–1927
- Don Sturdy, 1925–1935
- Tom Swift, Jr., 1954–1971 (technically, "Victor Appleton II")
- Tom Swift (Third Series), 1981–1984
- Tom Swift (Fourth Series), 1991–1993

Howard R. Garis contributed to the original Tom Swift series. James Duncan Lawrence wrote 23 of the Tom Swift, Jr. novels.

== See also ==
- Roy Rockwood
