= Deadly Messages =

1985 film by Jack Bender

- Genre: Horror; Mystery; Thriller
- Written by: William Bleich
- Directed by: Jack Bender
- Starring: Kathleen Beller; Michael Brandon
- Music by: Brad Fiedel
- Country of origin: United States
- Original language: English

Production
- Producer: Paul Pompian
- Production locations: Los Angeles; Warner Brothers Burbank Studios - 4000 Warner Boulevard, Burbank, California
- Cinematography: Rexford L. Metz
- Editor: Jim Benson
- Running time: 94 minutes
- Production company: Columbia Pictures Television

Original release
- Network: ABC
- Release: February 21, 1985

Deadly Messages is a 1985 made-for-TV horror mystery thriller film directed by Jack Bender. Kathleen Beller stars.

The film is initially set in an apartment in New York City. A woman decides to use her absent roommate's Ouija board to communicate with spirits, and she contacts the spirit of the apartment's previous occupant who was supposedly murdered in 1978. When the roommate returns from a date, she thinks that she witnesses the murder of the original woman. The police can not find any corpse of evidence of murder, and the dead woman is thought to have simply disappeared. The surviving woman's life starts falling apart while she is stalked by an unnamed attacker. While searching for the truth, she discovers that her own identity and memories may be false, and that she may be a known mental patient who disappeared after surviving a failed murder attempt.

== Plot ==
After Laura Daniels, who works at a dating consulting firm, leaves to go out on a date with lawyer Michael Krasnick, her roommate Cindy Matthews uses Laura's newly found Ouija board and gets in touch with 21-year-old "David", who claims to have been murdered in their New York apartment in 1978. Laura returns later to find an assailant strangling Cindy to death. Laura calls the police, but they arrive to find no body nor traces of any crime and cite her for a false alarm. Michael believes Laura but thinks that Cindy is pulling a prank and later discovers that Cindy has a habit of disappearing for long periods. Laura purchases a house alarm at the mall and is chased by Cindy's murderer.

That evening, Laura uses the Ouija board and comes in contact with "Mark", who claims to have murdered Cindy and announces that he is going to kill her as well. Laura faints and visits a doctor the next day for a brain scan, where she receives prescription drugs from Dr. Kelton. Laura is then fired from her job when her boss claims her résumé is filled with lies. Angry, she goes for a swim to calm herself but is attacked again in the pool. Kelton contacts Michael and tells him that Laura has received electroshock therapy in the past, and may have schizophrenia or depression. Michael confronts her, although Laura denies Kelton's claims.

Shortly thereafter, Michael finds out that most of Laura's life stories are also featured in a series of children's books written by another Laura Daniels. After another confrontation, Laura admits to Michael that she might be insane, but he believes that she is a compulsive liar and leaves her. After Laura visits the library and learns that a Mark Banning was once murdered and immolated in her apartment, Cindy's murderer attacks Laura in the apartment with an axe. Laura calls the police, who no longer believe her, and she's forced to hide in the closet before fleeing. A visit to the police station does not help her, and when she investigates Mark's death herself, she finds that his sister, Jennifer, is a mental patient.

When Laura visits Jennifer's mental hospital, the staff recognize Laura as Jennifer. Nurse Crenshaw explains to her that she escaped from the institution over a year ago, following an attack by a man who appears to be Cindy's murderer. In the hospital library, Laura finds Laura Daniels' children's books and realizes she assumed the author's identity after her escape.

Laura checks into a local motel and is met by Michael, who apologizes for his behavior and admits that he wants her back. After Michael leaves for pizza, the murderer attacks Michael in his car and stabs him in the leg before going to the motel and attacking Laura. After she bludgeons him with a lamp and runs off, he chases her, and as he is about to stab her, Michael shoots him to death. Laura suddenly realizes that the murderer is her brother, Mark.

At the police station, Kelton explains that the Ouija board brought out Laura's subconscious fears that Mark would kill her. Laura explains that the man killed in her apartment in 1978 was her ex-boyfriend David, not Mark. Mark was emotionally disturbed and killed David because their father did not approve of David dating Laura. Mark then locked Laura in a closet and set the apartment on fire, hoping she would die as well, but she escaped and fell into a coma. The police assumed the immolated corpse was Mark's because the room was registered to him. Michael points out that this does not explain the messages that Cindy—whose body was found in the trunk of Mark's car in another town—received while using the board alone.

The motel owners later discover the Ouija board that Laura left behind. After a storm causes the power to go out, they hear a noise. Startled, the man asks if anyone is there, and the planchette moves by itself to point to "yes".

== Cast ==
- Kathleen Beller as Laura Daniels
- Michael Brandon as Michael Krasnick
- Dennis Franz as Detective Max Lucas
- Scott Paulin as Dr. Roger Kelton
- Elizabeth Huddle as Nurse Irma Crenshaw
- Charles Tyner as George Clark
- George Wyner as Mr. Lawson
- Raye Birk as Harding
- Kurtwood Smith as Lieutenant Burton
- Sherri Stoner as Cindy Matthews
- Joseph G. Medalis as Kenneth Blatt
- Barbara Collentine as Loretta Clark
- Dennis Redfield as Dick Pizza
- Michael Cassidy as Mark Banning
- Michael Miller as Pawnbroker
- Wally Dalton as Fire Chief Jack Brandt
- Rion Hunter as Lester
- Patricia Gaul as Madge
- Terry Wills as Hal
- Troy Evans as Jessup
- Doris Singleton as Marge
- Henry G. Sanders as Gym Attendant

== Production ==
According to lead actress Kathleen Beller, the film differed from her earlier thrillers—such as Are You in the House Alone? (1978) and No Place to Hide (1981)—by "[not taking] itself too seriously". In an interview, Beller explained that her tendency to portray victims in films was encouraged by "the color and size of [her] big brown eyes", "the way [she interprets] roles" and "the episodic roles [she] did while [she] was growing up". Her casting in the film was an unusual one: according to the actress, she received a call from her agent about a script, read it immediately, and drove to the studio an hour later, expecting a meeting. However, when she arrived, she was asked if she could start working right away. She took the role because of "the whirlwind casting", and the fact that she had not worked for seven months, since a guest spot on Glitter.

== Reception ==
John J. O'Connor of The New York Times said the film "keeps turning quirkily enough to arouse curiosity" and concluded that it "may not be convincing but it is slyly amusing."

In a retrospective review, Hal Erickson of All Movie Guide criticized the film by claiming that the makers found the premise "amusing" and did not have "faith in the project", which, according to the review, showed on film.
