= The Sword and the Sorcerer =

1982 film by Albert Pyun

- Theatrical release poster by Peter Andrew Jones
- Directed by: Albert Pyun
- Written by: Albert Pyun; Tom Karnowski; John V. Stuckmeyer
- Produced by: Robert S. Bremson; Brandon Chase; Marianne Chase
- Starring: Lee Horsley; Kathleen Beller; Simon MacCorkindale; George Maharis; Richard Lynch
- Cinematography: Joseph Margine
- Edited by: Marshall Harvey
- Music by: David Whitaker
- Distributed by: Group 1 International Distribution Organization Ltd.
- Release date: April 23, 1982
- Running time: 99 minutes
- Country: United States
- Language: English
- Budget: $4 million
- Box office: $39.1 million

The Sword and the Sorcerer is a 1982 American sword-and-sorcery film co-written and directed by Albert Pyun, and starring Lee Horsley, Kathleen Beller, Simon MacCorkindale, George Maharis, Richard Lynch, and Richard Moll. The plot concerns a mercenary with a three-bladed projectile sword who rediscovers his royal heritage when he is recruited to help a princess foil the designs of a brutal tyrant, and a powerful, devil-like sorcerer, in conquering the land.

The film had initially mixed reviews, but a cult following developed. It was a box office success, grossing almost ten times its budget.

== Plot ==
King Titus Cromwell of Aragon lands with his men on Tomb Island. They have come in search of Xusia of Delos, a long-dead sorcerer who may help overthrow Cromwell's rival, King Richard of Ehdan, the richest kingdom in the known world. Using one of Xusia's worshipers to awaken him, Cromwell convinces Xusia to join his cause. With the sorcerer's black magic at his command, Cromwell easily lays waste to Richard's formidable army.

Fearing the sorcerer might turn against him, Cromwell stabs Xusia and throws him off a cliff. As Richard prepares to lead a last-ditch charge against Cromwell, he orders his family to evacuate, entrusting his youngest son Talon with his triple-bladed projectile sword. He instructs Talon to avenge his death should it occur.

Searching the battlefield for survivors, Talon comes across his father's cousin, Lord Mogullen, who confirms the battle is lost. Talon spies his father in the distance, just seconds before his execution. Enraged, Talon wants to claim his revenge; Mogullen, however, warns him that Cromwell will intercept the queen at the river. Talon desperately races to the river on horseback, but is too late to prevent the deaths of his brother Henry and their mother at Cromwell's hands. After narrowly surviving an ambush, Talon manages to evade capture and flee the kingdom.

Eleven years later, Cromwell has expanded his empire to include several neighboring kingdoms, and Talon is now a seasoned mercenary seeking to avenge his family. Elsewhere, the surviving Xusia also vows to repay Cromwell for his treachery. In the kingdom of Ehdan, a rebellion has begun under Mogullen's son Mikah, viewed by many to be the rightful heir. After meeting in secret with Machelli, Cromwell's war chancellor, Mikah rendezvous with his sister Alana to discuss their plans, but Machelli betrays him to Cromwell who suddenly bursts into their hideout and captures Mikah after a brief struggle.

Alana flees, but is eventually cornered by Cromwell's men who attempt to rape her. Talon interrupts and easily dispatches her assailants. At a nearby tavern, Alana learns of her brother's imprisonment and asks Talon to rescue him, along with a faction of rebels who have been trapped by Cromwell's Red Dragon archers. Unable to bribe the lustful mercenary with gold, Alana reluctantly offers herself to him for one night. Satisfied, Talon departs on his mission, but Cromwell's men arrive shortly thereafter and capture Alana as well.

Talon annihilates the Red Dragon archers with their own casks of oil, then leads the rebels in infiltrating Cromwell's castle. He rescues Mikah and successfully evacuates him, only to be chased and captured by Cromwell himself. After forcing Alana to marry him, Cromwell invites four neighboring kings to their wedding feast, where he intends to assassinate them with Talon crucified in the dining hall. Before the plot can be carried out, Talon summons the strength to free himself from the crucifix just as Mikah and his fellow rebels storm into the hall and overpower Cromwell's soldiers.

Cromwell attempts to flee the castle with Alana, but Talon intercepts them. While he and the rebels clash with Cromwell's guards, Machelli takes Alana to the catacombs beneath the castle, where he reveals his true identity as Xusia. Although Cromwell tries to intercede, he is outmatched by the sorcerer, but Talon is able to resist Xusia's magic powers long enough to strike him down with a projectile blade.

Talon then engages Cromwell in combat, slaying the evil king with a spring-loaded blade concealed in his gauntlet. He saves Alana from a giant constrictor snake before finally killing the newly risen Xusia with the same blade.

Recognizing Mikah as being better qualified to rule their kingdom, Talon yields the crown of Ehdan to him. Alana honors her commitment to spend one night with her brother's savior, after which Talon and his fellow mercenaries prepare to leave Ehdan in search of further adventures.

== Cast ==
House of Ehdan
- Christopher Cary as King Richard
- Nina Van Pallandt as Queen Malia
- Barry Chase as Prince Tavis, Richard and Malia's elder son
- Lee Horsley as Prince Talon, Richard and Malia's younger son
  - James Jarnigan as Young Talon
- Anna Bjorn as Princess Elizabeth, Richard and Malia's daughter
  - Christina Nigra as Young Elizabeth
- Russ Marin as Lord Mogullen, Richard's cousin
- Simon MacCorkindale as Prince Mikah, Mogullen's son
  - Anthony Farrar as Young Mikah
- Kathleen Beller as Princess Alana, Mogullen's daughter
  - Gina Smika as Young Alana

Talon's Mercenaries

- Joe Regalbuto as Darius
- Earl Maynard as Morgan
- Reb Brown as Phillip

Mikah's Rebels

- Anthony De Longis as Rodrigo
- Lennie Geer as Cornellus
- Patrick O'Moore as Devereux
- Thomas Rosales as Kabal

House of Aragon

- Richard Lynch as King Titus Cromwell
- George Maharis as Lord Machelli, Cromwell's war chancellor
- Steve Davis as Thogan, general of Cromwell's royal guard
- Greg Finley as Rumbolt, another general
- Hubie Kerns as Renquo, another general
- Robert Tessier as Verdugo, Cromwell's dungeon-master

House of Delos

- Richard Moll as Xusia
- Emily Yancy as Ban Urlu, Xusia's priestess

Additional Cast

- Jeff Corey as Craccus
- Joseph Ruskin as Malcolm
- George Murdock as Quade
- Peter Breck as King Leonidas of Benoa
- Alan Caillou as King Sancho of Valencia
- Michael Evans as King Ludwig of Garis
- Jay Robinson as King Charles of France
- Simmy Bow as The Cardinal
- George Fisher as Nimshu
- Tammi Furness as Myra
- Edgy Lee as Acolyte
- Charlie Messenger as Pablo
- Shelley Taylor Morgan as Bar-Bro
- Alvah Stanley as Sades
- William Watson as Karak

== Release ==
The Sword and the Sorcerer was released theatrically in the United States by Group 1 International Distribution Organization Ltd in April 1982.

== Reception ==
The film grossed $39,103,425 at the box office, making it the most profitable independent film of 1982. It even spawned a short-lived production line of three-bladed plastic swords in resemblance to Talon's.

Variety gave the film a negative review, citing its lackluster script, lack of acting talent, and fast-paced, "atrocity-a-minute" action scenes. Similarly, The New York Times described it as "nonsensical" and "inept", and Roger Ebert gave it half a star, describing it as "an Identikit movie [which] doesn't care much about character".

After this criticism, the film became a cult classic and is regarded as one of Pyun's best. The review aggregator website Rotten Tomatoes reported that 67% of critics have given the film a positive review based on 12 reviews, with an average rating of 6.10/10, making it Pyun's highest-rated film to date.

Arco Toys in conjunction with Fleetwood Toys made a number of monster figures that included the logo of the film, including a winged man with the head of a lion, and a man with the head of a cobra.

== Sequel ==
The Sword and the Sorcerer was originally conceived as the first in a series of several films.

A sequel, Tales of an Ancient Empire (as trailed at the end of The Sword and the Sorcerer), directed by Pyun, was released on January 24, 2012 on DVD. Kevin Sorbo, Victoria Maurette and Lee Horsley starred in the film, the latter reprising the role from the original film. Although Christopher Lambert and Yancy Butler were initially announced to appear in the film, they do not appear.

== Home media ==
According to the 1987 book American Film Distribution: The Changing Marketplace, the film earned $11 million in video rentals.

The Sword and the Sorcerer was released on DVD on April 24, 2001 by Starz/Anchor Bay. Shout! Factory released a special edition 4K Resolution UHD Blu-ray on March 15, 2022.

== See also ==
- The Beastmaster – a contemporaneous sword and sorcery movie
- List of American films of 1982
