= Girl detective =

Genre of detective fiction, based around a young female crime-solving protagonist

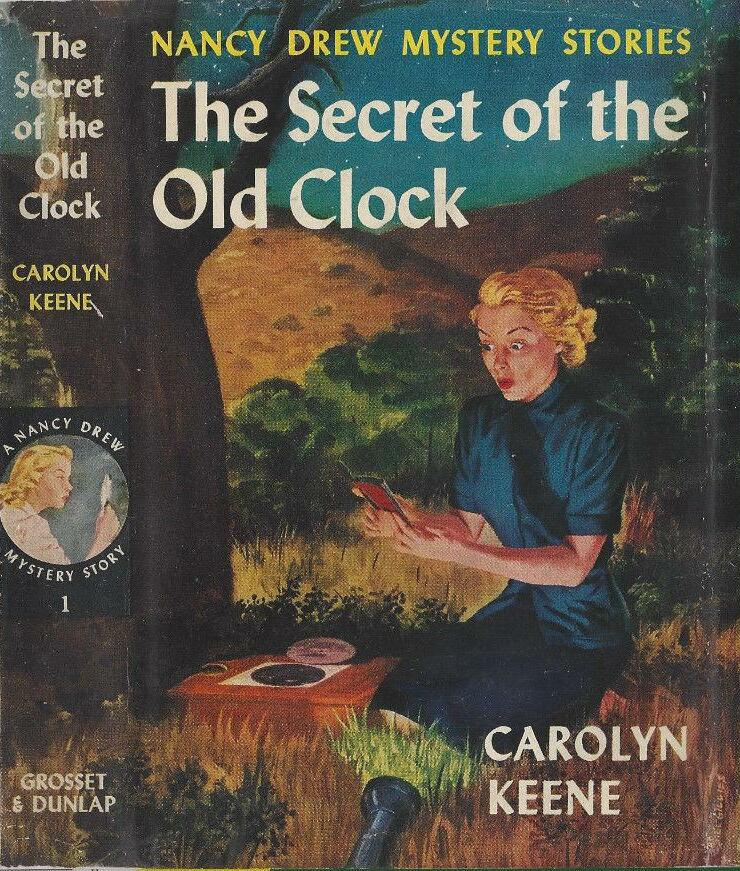
The Secret of the Old Clock (1939) a Nancy Drew mystery

Girl detective is a genre of detective fiction featuring a young, often teen-aged, female protagonist who solves crimes as a hobby.

== History ==
The term “girl detective” appeared in New York Nell, the Boy-Girl Detective (1854) by Edward Wheeler, which featured a teenage girl who dresses as a boy to sell newspapers and solve crimes.

A professional female detective appeared in the popular stories Miss Madelyn Mack, Detective, written by Hugh Cosgro Weir in 1909. But the earliest published version of a girl sought out as an amateur detective appears in the story collection The Golden Slipper and Other Problems for Violet Strange, by Anna Katharine Green, published in 1915. The latter featured a debutante who secretly solves crimes while taking part in New York high society.

Several novels for young readers by L. Frank Baum also had young female characters involved in crime solving, especially in cases involving protecting their family. Phoebe Daring was a 16-year old who took on the task of proving her twin brother's innocence in The Daring Twins: A Story for Young Folk, published in 1911. Baum's character of Mary Louise Burrows was a fifteen-year-old girl who works to reveal her grandfather's innocence in his book series The Bluebird Books begun in 1916 under the pseudonym Edith Van Dyne.

One of the best known and longest-running girl detective series was the Nancy Drew mystery series, started in 1930 and running under a number of subseries titles, including ‘’Nancy Drew: Girl Detective’’ (2004-2012) and the ‘’Nancy Drew Diaries’’ (started in 2013). She is often cited as the most influential of the girl sleuth characters. The original series was published by the Stratemeyer publishing company. The books appeared under the author name of Carolyn Keene, a pseudonym used by a number of authors for the series over the years.

The popularity of the Nancy Drew series spawned many mid-20th-century detecting heroines such as Judy Bolton (1932 – 1967), created by Margaret Sutton; Kay Tracey (1934 to 1942); and Trixie Belden (1948 to 1986).

A subgenre with middle-school heroines also developed, starting with Louise Fitzhugh’s novel Harriet the Spy written in 1964, and including the Flavia de Luce series by Alan Bradley, begun in 2009 with the book The Sweetness at the Bottom of the Pie, and The Great Shelby Holmes by Elizabeth Eulberg, and Friday Barnes, Girl Detective by R.A. Spratt, both from 2016.

== Film and television ==
In films of the early 20th century, this character type was already seen, as in The Girl Detective (1915), a series of 2-reel thrillers directed by James W. Horner which featured a society girl who served as a special investigator for the police. Ruth Roland starred as the girl detective who worked on cases where her unique talents could help to solve crimes. Each short film was a complete story episode.

Multiple versions of Nancy Drew were filmed. In the '30s there were a number of Nancy drew films: Nancy Drew: Detective (1938); Nancy Drew... Reporter (1939); Nancy Drew... Trouble Shooter (1939); Nancy Drew and the Hidden Staircase (1939). On TV there were alternating episodes of The Hardy Boys/Nancy Drew Mysteries from 1977 to 1979, starring Pamela Sue Martin as Nancy. A Disney movie was made in 2002, starring Maggie Lawson as a college student Nancy. Another Nancy Drew movie was made in 2007, starring Emma Roberts as Nancy Drew.
