= Camp Fire Girls (novel series) =

Children's book series

Cover of a Camp Fire Girls novel

The Camp Fire Girls books are novels written for children by various authors from 1912 into the 1930s portraying members of the Camp Fire Girls.

There were several different Camp Fire Girls series of novels, from numerous publishers. One historian wrote that, in the early 1900s, all publishers specializing in cheap children's novels had commissioned either individual titles or an entire series of Camp Fire Girls books.

The novels published by A. L. Burt stated they were the only series of stories for Camp Fire Girls endorsed by the officials of the Camp Fire Girls' Organization.

The novels published by Goldsmith Publishing Company, and written under the pen name of Margaret Penrose, were repackaged reprints of The Radio Girls series published by Cupples & Leon. Goldsmith described their book series by stating: "These stories take in the activities of several bright girls who become interested in all present day adventures."

== Authors ==
- E. A. Watson Hyde
- Margaret Penrose
- Harriet Pyne Grove
- Harriet Rietz
- Hildegarde Gertrude Frey a/k/a Hildegard G. Frey
- Howard Roger Garis (as Marion Davidson)
- Irene Elliott Benson
- Isabel Hornibrook
- Jane L. Stewart
- Julianne DeVries a/k/a Julian DeVries
- Margaret Vandercook
- Margaret Love Sanderson
- Samuel E. Lowe (as Helen Hart)
- Stella M. Francis
- Amy Ella Blanchard

== Book titles listed by publishers ==
=== Goldensmith Publishing Co. ===
These novels were a reworked version of Cupples & Leon’s Radio Girls book series after the rights to that series had been sold to Goldensmith.

Date	Title	Author
1900s	The Camp Fire Girls of Rosalyn, or, a Strange Message from the Air	Margaret Penrose
1900s	The Camp Fire Girls on the Program, or, Singing and Reciting at the Sending Station	Margaret Penrose
1910s	The Camp Fire Girls at Forest Lodge, or, The Strange Hut in the Swamps	Margaret Penrose
1930s	The Camp Fire Girls on Station Island, or, The Wireless from the Steam Yacht	Margaret Penrose

=== M.A. Donohue & Co. ===
By the early 1900s M.A. Donohue & Co. only published children's books.

Date	Title	Author
1910s	Ethel Hollister's First Summer as a Camp Fire Girl	Irene Elliott Benson
1912	How Ethel Hollister Became a Camp Fire Girl	Irene Elliott Benson
1912	Ethel Hollister's Second Summer as a Camp Fire Girl	Irene Elliott Benson
1913	The Camp Fire Girls on the Ice, or, The Mystery of a Winter Cabin	Howard Roger Garis (as Marion Davidson)
1913	Camp Fire Girls, or, The Secret of an Old Mill	Howard Roger Garis (as Marion Davidson)
1918	Camp Fire Girls in the Alleghany Mountains, or, A Christmas Success Against Odds	Stella M. Francis
1918	Camp Fire Girls in the Country, or, The Secret Aunt Hannah Forgot	Stella M. Francis
1918	Camp Fire Girls' Outing, or, Ethel Hollister’s Second Summer in Camp	Stella M. Francis
1918	Camp Fire Girls at Twin Lakes, or, The Quest of a Summer Vacation	Stella M. Francis
1918	Camp Fire Girls' in the Forest, or, The Lost Trail Found	Irene Elliott Benson
1918	Camp Fire Girls Lake Camp, or, Searching for New Adventures	Irene Elliott Benson
1918	Camp Fire Mountaineering, or, Overcoming All Obstacles	Irene Elliott Benson
1918	Camp Fire Girls on a Hike, or, Lost in the Great Northern Woods	Stella M. Francis
1918	Camp Fire Girls' Rural Retreat, or, The Quest of a Secret	Irene Elliot Benson
1918	Camp Fire Girls' Trip Up a River, or, Ethel Hollister's First Lesson	Stella M. Francis

=== John C. Winston Co. ===
The John C. Winston Co. series was written by author Margaret Vandercook.

Date	Title	Author
1913	The Camp Fire Girls at Sunrise Hill	Margaret Vandercook
1913	The Camp Fire Girls Amid the Snows	Margaret Vandercook
1914	The Camp Fire Girls in the Outside World	Margaret Vandercook
1914	The Camp Fire Girls Across the Seas	Margaret Vandercook
1915	The Camp Fire Girls in After Years	Margaret Vandercook
1915	The Camp Fires Girls' Careers	Margaret Vandercook
1917	The Camp Fire Girls at the End of the Trail	Margaret Vandercook
1917	The Camp Fire Girls on the Edge of the Desert	Margaret Vandercook
1918	The Camp Fire Girls Behind the Lines	Margaret Vandercook
1918	The Camp Fire Girls on the Field of Honor	Margaret Vandercook
1919	The Camp Fire Girls in Glorious France	Margaret Vandercook
1920	The Camp Fire Girls in Merrie England	Margaret Vandercook
1921	The Camp Fire Girls at Half Moon Lake	Margaret Vandercook
1921	The Camp Fire Girls by the Blue Lagoon	Margaret Vandercook

=== Lothrop, Lee & Shepard ===
In 1905 publisher Lee & Shepard merged with Lothrop Company to form a larger publishing house that specialized in children’s novels.

Date	Title	Author
1916	Girls of the Morning Glory Camp Fire	Isabel Hornibrook
1917	Camp Fire Girls and Mt. Greylock	Isabel Hornibrook
1919	Camp Fire Girls in War and Peace	Isabel Hornbook

=== Reilly & Britton Co. (1910s - 1920s) and Reilly & Lee (1930s) ===
Margaret Love Sanderson was a pseudonym used by author Margaret Vandercook

Date	Title	Author
1913	The Camp Fire Girls at Hillside	Margaret Love Sanderson
1914	The Camp Fire Girls at Pine-Tree Camp	Margaret Love Sanderson
1916	The Camp Fire Girls at Top o' the World	Margaret Love Sanderson
1917	The Camp Fire Girls at Lookout Pass	Margaret Love Sanderson
1918	The Camp Fire Girls at Driftwood Heights	Margaret Love Sanderson
1919	The Camp Fire Girls in Old Kentucky	Margaret Love Sanderson
1920	The Cap Fire Girls on a Yacht	Margaret Love Sanderson
1921	The Camp Fire Girls on Hurricane Island	Margaret Love Sanderson
1936	Caught in the Dark (re-issue of Camp Fire Girls at Driftwood Heights)	Margaret Love Sanderson
1936	A Cruise on the "Boojum": Camp Fire Girls on a Yacht (re-issue of Camp Fire Girls on a Yacht)	Margaret Love Sanderson
1936	Betty at Lookout Pass	Margaret Love Sanderson
1936	Jane Pellow in Kentucky: Camp Fire Girls in Old Kentucky (re-issue of Camp Fire Girls in Kentucky)	Margaret Vandercook
1936	Molly Wren's Promise (re-issue of The Camp Fire Girls at Top o' the World	Margaret Love Sanderson
1936	The Affairs of Jane & Breck	Margaret Love Sanderson

=== Saalfield Publishing Co. ===
The Saalfield Publishing Company's novels are about Bessie King and her friend Zeta, who overcome difficulties with the help of a group of Camp Fire Girls.

Date	Title	Author
1914	The Camp Fire Girls in the Woods, or Bessie King's First Council Fire	Jane L. Stewart
1914	The Camp Fire Girls on the Farm, or, Bessie King's New Chum	Jane L. Stewart
1914	The Camp Fire Girls at Long Lake, or, Bessie King in Summer Camp	Jane L. Stewart
1914	The Camp Fire Girls in the Mountains, or, Bessie King's Strange Adventure	Jane L. Stewart
1914	The Camp Fire Girls on the March, or, Bessie King's Test of Friendship	Jane L. Stewart
1914	The Camp Fire Girls at the Sea Shore, or, Bessie King's Happiness	Jane L. Stewart
1927	A Camp Fire Girl's First Council Fire (re-issue of The Camp Fire Girls in the Woods, or, Bessie King's First Council Fire)	Jane L. Stewart
1927	A Camp Fire Girl's Chum (re-issue of The Camp Fire Girls on the Farm, or, Bessie King's New Chum	Jane L. Stewart
1927	A Camp Fire Girl’ in Summer Camp (re-issue of The Camp Fire Girls at Long Lake, or, Bessie King in Summer Camp)	Jane L. Stewart
1927	A Camp Fire Girl's Adventure (re-issue of The Camp Fire Girls in the Mountains, or, Bessie King's Strange Adventure)	Jane L. Stewart
1927	A Camp Fire Girl's Test of Friendship (re-issue of The Camp Fire Girls on the March, or, Bessie King's Test of Friendship)	Jane L. Stewart
1927	A Camp Fire Girl's Happiness (re-issue of The Camp Fire Girls at the Sea Shore, or, Bessie King's Happiness)	Jane L. Stewart

=== W. A. Wilde ===
The W.A. Wilde Camp Fire Girls books were written by author Amy Ella Blanchard, and illustrated by Frank T. Merrill.

Date	Title	Author
1915	The Camp Fire Girls of Brightwood: a Story of How They Kindled Their Fire and Kept it Burning	Amy Ella Blanchard
1916	Fagots and Flames: A Story of Winter Camp Fires	Amy Ella Blanchard
1917	In Camp With the Musoday Camp Fire Girls	Amy Ella Blanchard

=== Whitman Publishing ===
Whitman Publishing’s Camp Fire Girl books are similar to the publisher's Mary Lee book series. The Camp Fire Girls in High School is almost identical to Mary Lee, the Red Cross Nurse.

Date	Title	Author
1915	The Camp Fire Girls' Success	Samuel E. Lowe (as Helen Hart)
1917	The Camp Fire Girls' Weekend Party	Harriet Rietz
1919	The Camp Fire Girls and Aunt Madge	Harriet Rietz
1920	The Camp Fire Girls in High School	Samuel E. Lowe (as Helen Hart)
1920	The Camp Fire Girls' Duty Call	Samuel E. Lowe (as Helen Hart)
1920	The Camp Fire Girls' Red Cross Work	Samuel E. Lowe (as Helen Hart)

=== A. L. Burt Co. ===
A. L. Burt's novels, about a troop of Camp Fire Girls from Cleveland, are similar to the Tom Slade Boy Scout book series.

Date	Title	Author
1916	The Camp Fire Girls at Snowy House, or, The Magic Garden	Hildegarde Gertrude Frey
1916	The Camp Fire Girls at School, or, The Wohelo Weavers	Hildegarde Gertrude Frey
1916	The Camp Fire Girls Go Motoring, or, Along the Road That Leads the Way	Hildegarde Gertrude Frey
1916	The Camp Fire Girls in the Maine Woods, or, The Winnebagos Go Camping	Hildegarde Gertrude Frey
1917	The Camp Fire Girls' Larks and Pranks, or, the House of the Open Door	Hildegarde Gertrude Frey
1917	The Camp Fire Girls on Ellen’s Isle, or, The Trail of the Seven Cedars	Hildegarde Gertrude Frey
1918	The Camp Fire Girls on the Open Road, or, Glorify Work	Hildegarde Gertrude Frey
1919	The Camp Fire Girls Do Their Bit, or, Over the Top With the Winnebagos	Hildegarde Gertrude Frey
1919	The Camp Fire Girls Solve a Mystery, or, The Christmas Adventure at Carver House	Hildegarde Gertrude Frey
1920	The Camp Fire Girls at Camp Keewaydin, or, Down Paddles	Hildegarde Gertrude Frey
1931	The Camp Fire Girls of Wyandotte Camp	Harriet Pyne Grove
1931	The Camp Fire Girls on the Trail	Harriet Pyne Grove

=== Little, Brown and Company ===
The title page of Pemrose Lorry Radio Amateur states: "The author acknowledges her indebtedness to Nawadaha of the Camp Fire (Ethel V. Smart) for the songs and rhymes, and for some helpful collaboration."

Date	Title	Author
1921	Pemrose Lorry Camp Fire Girl	Isabel Hornibrook
1923	Pemrose Lorry Radio Amateur	Isabel Hornibrook
1924	Pemrose Lorry Sky Sailor	Isabel Hornibrook

=== World Syndicate Publishing Co. ===
In 1928 World Syndicate Publishing Co. was purchased by Commercial Bookbinding Co, and later became World Publishing Company

Date	Title	Author
1933	The Camp Fire Girls as Detectives	Julian DeVries
1933	The Camp Fire Girls at Holly House	Julian DeVries
1933	The Camp Fire Girls Flying Around the Globe	Julian DeVries
1933	The Camp Fire Girls on Caliban Island	Julian DeVries
1935	The Camp Fire Girls as Federal Investigators	Julian DeVries
1935	The Camp Fire Girls at the White House	Julian DeVries

== See also ==
- Scouting in popular culture
