= Garis =

Garis is a surname. Notable people with the surname include:

- Howard R. Garis (1873–1962), American author
- Lilian Garis (1873–1954), American author, wife of Howard
- Roger Garis (1901–1967), American author

== See also ==
- Faris (name)
- Garis (Galilee)
- Paris (surname)
