= Pelagie Doane =

American illustrator

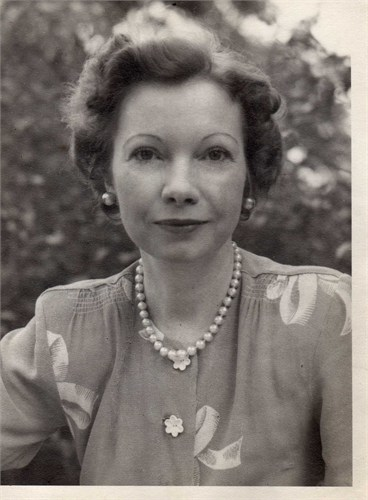
- Pelagie Doane Hoffner
- Born: Pelagie Dorothy Doane; April 11, 1906; Ambler, Pennsylvania
- Died: December 9, 1966 (aged 60)
- Other names: Pelagie Doane Hoffner, Dorothy Hoffner
- Occupations: Illustrator, writer

Pelagie Doane Hoffner (April 11, 1906 – December 9, 1966) was an American illustrator and writer of children's books.

== Early life and education ==
Doane was born in Ambler, Pennsylvania or Palmyra, New Jersey (sources vary), the daughter of Warren Finney Doane and Pelagie Judith Plasschaert Doane. Her father was an editor. She went to art school in Philadelphia. "For many generations there has been a Pelagie in the family," explained one profile, about her unusual given name.

== Career ==
Doane was a prolific illustrator of children's books from the 1930s into the 1960s, especially known for her work on books with Christian themes, and on Margaret Sutton's Judy Bolton mysteries. She also wrote books for children, again often on religious subjects. "Children are people, so I paint up to their level, not down," she explained about her work.

A Small Child's Bible (1946), with seventy stories written and illustrated by Doane, was described as "a standard" in 1960. "Here is a book that both child and parent can read together with pleasure," remarked a 1952 reviewer about her A Book of Nature, a child's guide to flora and fauna common in the northeastern United States.

== Publications ==
=== As illustrator ===
- Judy Bolton series by Margaret Sutton
- Melody Lane series by Lilian Garis
- Magic Makers series by Margaret Sutton
- Mary Paxson: Her Book (1931)
- Pinocchio Put-Together Book (1937), with Carlo Collodi and Christopher Rule
- Mother Goose (1940)
- Did You Ever? (1940) by Elizabeth Honness
- Belinda Balloon and the Big Wind (1940) by Elizabeth Honness
- Favorite Nursery Songs (1941)
- Two Bridgets (1941) by Cynthia Hathaway
- Trailer Trio (1942) by Emma Atkins Jacobs
- Polly Peters (1942) by Jane Quigg
- A Child's Garden of Verses (1942) by Robert Louis Stevenson
- Tell Me About God (1943) by Mary Alice Jones
- Singing with Peter and Patsy (1944) by Ann Sterling Boesel
- More Silver Pennies (1945) by Blanche Jennings Thompson
- Tell Me About Jesus (1946) by Mary Alice Jones
- The Child's Book of Prayers (1947)
- A Small Child's Book of Verse (1948)
- Heidi (1958) by Johanna Spyri
- Hans Brinker, or The Silver Skates (1961) by Mary Mapes Dodge
- Heidi's Children (1964) by Charles Tritten
- Fairy Elves (1964) by Robin Palmer

=== As author or editor ===
- Littlest Ones (1940)
- A Small Child's Bible (1946), "published in both Catholic and Protestant editions"
- A Book of Nature (1952)
- The Boy Jesus (1953)
- Bible Children: Stories from the Old Testament (1954)
- Poems of Praise (1957)
- The Story of Moses (1958)
- St. Francis (1960)

=== As Dorothy Hoffner ===
- Cooking Step by Step (1947)

== Personal life ==
Doane married Warren Earl Hoffner in the 1930s. They lived in Glendola, New Jersey after 1948. Her husband died in 1958, and she died in 1966, at the age of 60, in Belmar, New Jersey. There is a box of her illustrations from three book projects at the University of Minnesota.
