= Lilian Garis =

American author (1873–1954)

- Born: Lilian C. McNamara; October 20, 1873
- Died: April 19, 1954 (aged 80); Newark, New Jersey, US
- Occupation: Novelist
- Spouse: Howard R. Garis
- Children: Roger Garis, Cleo F. Garis
- Writing career
- Pen name: Margaret Penrose; Laura Lee Hope
- Genre: Juvenile fiction
- Notable works: Melody Lane series Girl Scouts series

Lilian C. Garis, born Lilian C. McNamara (20 October 1873 – 19 April 1954), was an American author who wrote hundreds of books of juvenile fiction between around 1915 and the early 1940s. Prior to this, she was the first female reporter for the Newark Evening News in New Jersey. Garis and her husband, Howard R. Garis, were possibly the most prolific children's authors of the early 20th century.

== Biography ==
Lilian McNamara was born in 1872 in Cleveland, Ohio. Her parents were Irish immigrants Edward and Winifred. By 1880, the family lived in Belleville, New Jersey the setting of her first book. The Newark Evening News reported that she'd submitted a poem "when a schoolgirl" and "a request to call at the office resulted in her being taken on by the local staff of which she was the youngest member." Her work appears under the name Lillian (or Lilian) Mack in the Sunday Call and Newark News from at least 1892, however, this story suggests she had earlier items published.

Lilian attended private schools including Dunkirk Union School. In 1893 her poem "Peace" was featured in the New Jersey Scrapbook of Women Writers created for the World's Columbian Exposition. At this point she used an alternate name "Lillian Mack" and lives in Newark.

Lilian was in charge of "Woman's Work" in the Newark Evening News from 1895 to 1900 and was known as "Miss Mack" or "Lilian Mack". Lillian was also a suffragette.

Lilian Garis is one of the writers who always wrote, She expressed herself in verse from early school days and it was then predicted that Lilian Mack would one day become a writer. Justifying this sentiment, while still in high school, she took charge of the woman's page for a city paper and her work there attracted such favorable attention that she left school to take entire charge of woman's work for the largest daily in an important Eastern city.

— Advertisement in Polly and Eleanor, Lillian Elizabeth Roy. Grosset & Dunlap, New York, 1922.

Lilian met Howard Garis at the Newark Evening News and the couple married in 1900. In 1951, they moved from East Orange, New Jersey to Amherst, Massachusetts. They had two children Roger and Cleo.

For the Stratemeyer Syndicate Garis wrote under the pseudonym Margaret Penrose and Laura Lee Hope, with her works including some of the earliest books in the Bobbsey Twins series as well as the Dorothy Dale series. But Mrs. Garis also wrote some books under her own name.

Among her 'fan' letters Lillian Garis receives some flattering testimonials of her girl readers' interest in her stories. From a class of thirty comes a vote of twenty-five naming her as their favorite author/ Perhaps in is the element of live mystery that Mrs. Garis always builds her stories upon, or perhaps it is because the girls easily can translate her own sincere interest in themselves from the stories. At any rate, her books prosper through the changing conditions of these times, giving pleasure, satisfaction, and, incidentally, that tactful word of inspiration, so important in literature for young girls. Mrs. Garis prefers to call her books 'juvenile novels' and in them romance is never lacking.

— Advertisement in Polly in the Orient, Lillian Elizabeth Roy, Grosset & Dunlap, New York, 1927

Lilian died April 19, 1954.

== Bibliography of titles written under Garis' name ==
=== Let's Make Believe series ===
First published by R. F. Fenno; also by Donohue

- Let's Make Believe We're Keeping House
- Let's Play Circus
- Let's Make Believe We're Soldiers

=== The Girl Scouts series ===
- The Girl Scout Pioneers
- The Girl Scouts at Bellaire
- The Girl Scouts at Sea Crest
- The Girl Scouts at Camp Comalong
- The Girl Scouts at Rocky Ledge

=== Nancy Brandon set ===
Originally printed by Milton Bradley, then by Grosset & Dunlap and Whitman.

- Nancy Brandon, Enthusiast (Milton Bradley's original title; renamed Nancy Brandon by Grosset & Dunlap)
- Nancy Brandon's Mystery

=== Barbara Hale set ===
- Barbara Hale (subtitled Barbara Hale: A Doctor's Daughter)
- Barbara Hale's Mystery Friend (subtitled, then later completely retitled, as "[or,] Barbara Hale and Cozette")

=== Ted set ===
- A Girl Named Ted
- Ted and Tony

=== Cleo set ===
- Cleo's Conquest
- Cleo's Misty Rainbow

=== Connie Loring set ===
- Connie Loring's Dilemma (retitled later)
- Connie Loring's Ambition (retitled later)

=== Judy Jordon set ===
- Judy Jordon
- Judy Jordon's Discovery

=== Sally set ===
- Sally for Short
- Sally Found Out

=== Gloria set ===
- Gloria at Boarding School
- Gloria: A Girl and Her Dad

=== Joan set ===
- Joan: Just a Girl
- Joan's Garden of Adventure

=== Melody Lane series ===
Two versions were printed of the first six books, one with cover art by Ruth King and one by Pelagie Doane (best known for her work on the Judy Bolton series). The series follows Carol Duncan and her sister and friends as they solve mysteries around Melody Lane. The events they encounter are standard series book fare of the time period; and are often criticized for their dated writing style and slow moving plots.

- The Ghost of Melody Lane (1933)
- The Forbidden Trail (1933)
- The Tower Secret (1934)
- The Wild Warning (1934)
- Terror at Moaning Cliff (1935)
- The Dragon Of The Hills (1936)
- The Mystery Of Stingman's Alley (1938)
- The Secret of the Kashmir Shawl (1939)
- The Hermit of Proud Hill (1940)
- The Clue of the Crooked Key Listed as the next title in the series in "The Hermit of Proud Hill". Never published and unknown if this book was ever written.

=== The Riverton Mystery ===
- The Riverton Mystery (1944) The unreleased manuscript was never published until 2023, after the New York Public Library gave permission for its release.
