= Dorothy Dale =

Girls book series

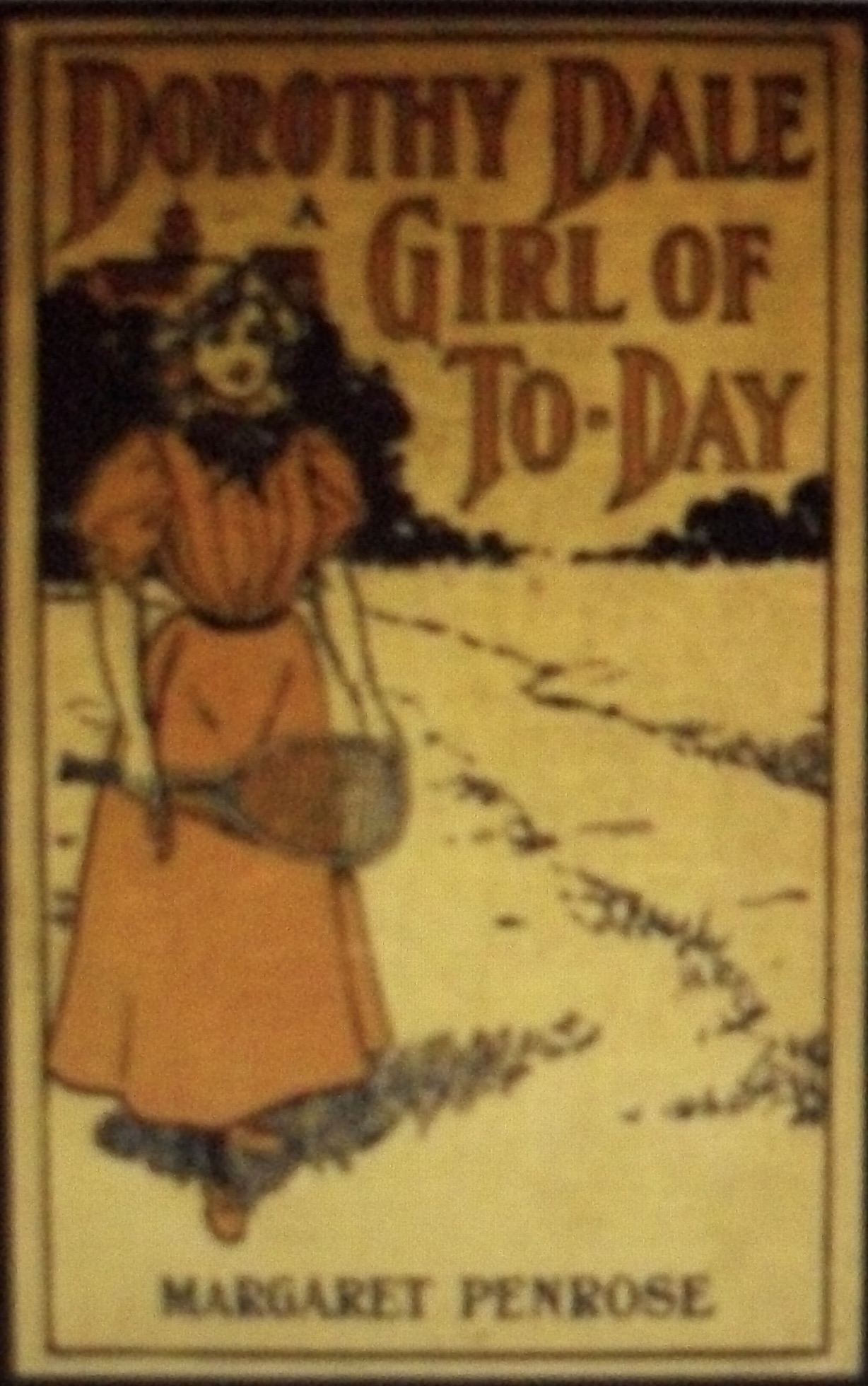
- Cover of first book
- Author: Margaret Penrose
- Language: English
- Genre: Girls' book series
- Published: 1908 - 1924
- Publisher: Cupples & Leon
- Publication place: United States

Dorothy Dale is a girls' book series written by Margaret Penrose, a pseudonym. The Stratemeyer Syndicate produced a total of thirteen of the series' books between the years 1908 and 1924. The books were published by Cupples & Leon.

In the first book, Dorothy Dale: A Girl of To-Day readers learn that Dorothy is fourteen years old and lives in the small New York town of Dalton. Her mother was dead, so Dorothy seems older, and "really very sensible for her years." Her father is Major Frank Dale, a prominent Civil War veteran. He is active in the G.A.R., and owns The Bugle, Dalton's only newspaper. He calls his daughter his Little Captain, and Dorothy helps him in the newspaper office.

Other members of the Dale household are ten-year-old Joe, seven-old-year Roger, and the housekeeper, elderly Mrs. Martin. The children call the good-natured lady Aunt Libby.

Dorothy's best friend is Octavia Travers, who is called Tavia. The girl has a "reputation of being wild" for she has little interest in school, and loves to spend time walking in the woods. Tavia is misunderstood by most people and is "considered an idler" by everyone except her father and Dorothy.

== Authors ==
Lilian C. Garis wrote volumes 1 through 8 & 11; W. Bert Forster wrote volumes 9, 10 & 12; and, after a seven-year pause in the series, Elizabeth Duffield Ward wrote the final volume 13.

== Book titles ==
1. Dorothy Dale: A Girl of To-Day (1908)
2. Dorothy Dale at Glenwood School (1908)
3. Dorothy Dale's Great Secret (1909)
4. Dorothy Dale and Her Chums (1909)
5. Dorothy Dale's Queer Holidays (1910)
6. Dorothy Dale's Camping Days (1911)
7. Dorothy Dale's School Rivals (1912)
8. Dorothy Dale in the City (1913)
9. Dorothy Dale's Promise (1914)
10. Dorothy Dale in the West (1915)
11. Dorothy Dale's Strange Discovery (1916)
12. Dorothy Dale's Engagement (1917)
13. Dorothy Dale to the Rescue (1924)
