= Isabel Hornibrook =

Irish-born American author (1859–1952)

- Born: 1859; Ireland
- Died: 1952 (aged 92–93)
- Occupation: Children's author
- Organization(s): International Academy of the History of Science; Worcester Woman's Club

Isabel Hornibrook (1859–1952) was an Irish-born American author of children's literature. Her first story was accepted for an English magazine, at the age of 14. A prolific author, several of her children's books were illustrated.

== Early life and education ==
Isabel Katherine Hornibrook was born in the south of Ireland. Her parents were Nicholls Cole-Bowen and Emma Emilia (Bates) Hornibrook. She came from a literary family, her mother being a veteran English author, and her brother a noted short-story writer in London. Her grandfather was Henry Bates, of the British Navy.

She was educated under private tutors.

== Career ==
Hornibrook began to contribute to English papers while she was in her teens. She followed that up by writing eight juvenile books for Blackie & Co. and other English publishers, besides having stories in several magazines.

She spent time in England, Ireland, and France before moving to Worcester, Massachusetts in 1892, where she resided with her sister. Hornibrook kept up her English connection, and a book of hers was subsequently brought out by Blackie & Co. One of her books for boys, entitled Camp and Trail, was published in 1897 by the Lothrop Company, Boston, and was commended by the U.S. press. Dr. Silas Weir Mitchell wrote to the author regarding it, that he was an old haunter of lakes and woods, and he was sorry for the boy who didn't enjoy it. Some stories of Hornibrook's in the style of A Race for Camp appeared later on in The Youth's Companion.

Hornibrook was an honorary member, with diploma and signia, of the Académie d'histoire internationale, Paris. She was also a member of the Worcester Woman's Club. In her final years she resided at 22 Hollywood Street, Worcester, Massachusetts.

== Selected works ==
- Leo's Trial
- O'Donoghue's Wood
- Minnie Evans
- Two of them
- In the service, 1885 (text)
- The queen of squats, 1888
- Little Troublesome, 1888
- Jujube. A Story of Humanity in 1887, 1889
- The Castle on the Shore, 1890
- Lost in Maine Woods. A Story of Adventure for Boys, 1896
- Camp and trail : A story of the Maine woods, 1897
- Tuke: A Story for Boys, 1897
- Captain Curley's Boy, 1900
- From keel to kite; how Oakley Rose became a naval architect, 1908 (text)
- A Scout of To-day, 1913 (text)
- Heroes of air and sea, with David C. Cook, 1913
- Girls of the Morning-Glory Camp Fire, ca. 1916, illustrated by John Goss (text)
- Camp Fire Girls and Mt. Greylock, 1917
- Drake of Troop One, 1918
- Scout Drake in War Time, 1918 (text)
- Camp Fire Girls in war and peace, 1919, illustrated by John Goss
- Coxswain Drake of the Seascouts, 1920, illustrated by Sears Gallagher (text)
- Drake and the Adventurers' Cup, 1922
- Pemrose Lorry, camp fire girl, 1921, illustrated by Nana French Bickford
- Pemrose Lorry, radio amateur, 1923 (text)
- Pemrose Lorry, Sky Sailor, 1924
- Pemrose Lorry, Torchbearer, 1926
- Romee Ann, Sophomore, 1925
- Romee Ann, Junior, 1926

== See also ==
- Camp Fire Girls (novel series)
