= Kathleen Beller =

American actress (born 1956)

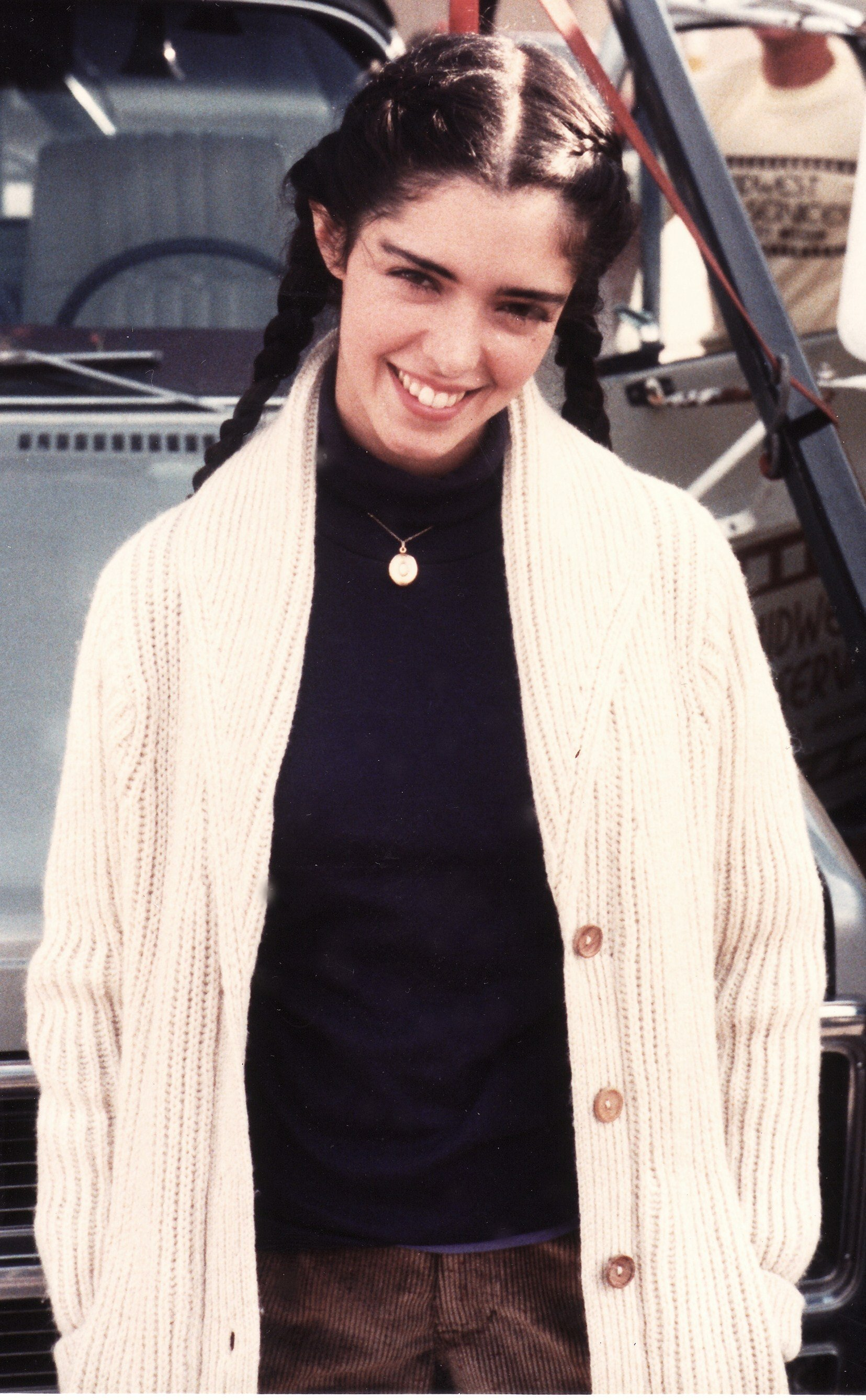
- Beller on the set of Touched in 1982
- Born: Kathleen Jennifer Beller; February 10, 1956 (age 70); Westchester, New York, U.S.
- Occupation: Actress
- Years active: 1965–1991, 2016
- Known for: Promises in the Dark; Dynasty; Search for Tomorrow; The Sword and the Sorcerer
- Spouse: Thomas Dolby (m. 1988)
- Children: 3

Kathleen Jennifer Beller (born February 10th, 1956) is an American actress who was nominated for a Golden Globe Award for Best Motion Picture Actress in a Supporting Role for her role in Promises in the Dark (1979) and was well known for her role as Kirby Anders on the prime time soap opera Dynasty. She had a small role in The Godfather Part II and a featured role in The Betsy.

== Career ==
Beller started her career by appearing in several commercials. She debuted on television in 1971, taking over the role of Liza Walton Sentell in the daytime soap opera Search for Tomorrow, which was originated by Denise Nickerson. She appeared on the show until 1974 when she quit to move from New York City to Los Angeles. After arriving, Don Most arranged for her to get an agent. Her film debut was a small role in 1974's The Godfather Part II, portraying an actress in a play that the young Vito Corleone and Genco Abbandando attended. Later, she was recognized more for her television work, appearing in TV movies and guest-starring in television series, notably the soap Dynasty. She played Betsy in 1978's The Betsy, a role Beller hoped would end her television career and start her film career:

For a TV actress, getting that first feature film is a major step. So this is very important in my life. But, funnily, getting this part in The Betsy was actually the easiest part I ever got. I did one reading, one lunch to discuss the part with the director (Daniel Petrie) and that was that. I had the part. From now on, if I do any TV at all it will only be good TV. It's interesting how one feature film — and The Betsy isn't even released yet—can make such a difference in a career. On the strength of just being in The Betsy, I am finding it so much easier. Now I go in to read for a movie part, and they know me, the door is at least partly open.

Despite the optimism, the film was panned and did not advance Beller's career. She blamed the role, which she said could have been played by anyone. Beller returned to television work, appearing in TV movies such as Mary White (1977) and Are You in the House Alone? (1978). She recalled the exhausting casting procedure of Mary White, which lasted daily for three weeks. Beller also continued to appear in films, playing a supporting role in the 1978 musical comedy Movie Movie, and portraying a cancer patient in the film Promises in the Dark (1979). She spent three months researching the Promises in the Dark role, and later recalled it as one of her favorite roles. Although the film was a commercial failure, the role earned Beller a Golden Globe nomination.

In 1981, Beller co-starred in the psychological thriller No Place to Hide, her first adult role. Her character initially was going to be a teenager, but Beller insisted on playing someone more mature. Although she assumed this demand would cause her not to be cast, she won the role, which the film's director changed to a woman in her early 20s. In an interview to promote the film, Beller admitted that, although she was 25 years old at the time, she still had trouble convincing people that she was older than 16. The following year, she played the female lead in the fantasy film The Sword and the Sorcerer (1982). The film was a commercial success, grossing $39 million on a $4 million budget, but Beller later commented that she was dissatisfied with the film. In 1982 Beller starred in the Civil War miniseries The Blue and the Gray, in which she played Kathy Reynolds, a senator's daughter.

Beller perhaps is best remembered for her role from 1982 to 1984 as Kirby Anders Colby in the prime time television soap opera Dynasty. She blamed her departure from Dynasty on the new writers who were hired in 1984, explaining that they had "lost interest in her character and that when her contract ended, they decided not to renew it". Beller said that "[she'd] come back if they wanted [her]". She reprised the role for Dynasty: The Reunion in 1991.

After her run on Dynasty, Beller starred in the TV thriller Deadly Messages, which Beller said differed from her earlier thrillers by "[not taking] itself too seriously". In an interview, she explained her tendency to portray victims in films is encouraged by "the color and size of [her] big brown eyes", "the way [she interprets] roles" and "the episodic roles [she] did while [she] was growing up". Her casting in the film was an unusual one: According to the actress, she received a call from her agent about a script, read it immediately, and drove to the studio an hour later, expecting a meeting. When she arrived, however, she was asked if she could start working right away. She took the role because of "the whirlwind casting", and the fact that she had not worked for seven months, since a guest spot on Glitter.

Beller also played Mary Caitlin Callahan on the short-lived school drama The Bronx Zoo.

== Personal life ==
Beller studied drama at age 13 in Bristol, England. In the mid-1980s, Beller announced she wanted to become a midwife, and told a reporter that she had "attended eight births so far".

Beller married English musician Thomas Dolby in Suffolk, England in 1988. They have three children, Harper, Talia and Graham. Beller and Dolby are depicted together on the front sleeve of Dolby's third album, Aliens Ate My Buick (1988).

== Filmography ==
=== Film ===
Year	Title	Role	Notes
1974	The Godfather Part II	Girl in 'Senza Mamma'	
1978	The Betsy	Betsy Hardeman	
1978	Movie Movie	Angie Popchik	
1979	Promises in the Dark	Elizabeth "Buffy" Koenig	Nominated—Golden Globe Award for Best Supporting Actress – Motion Picture
1981	Fort Apache, The Bronx	Theresa	
1981	Surfacing	Kate	
1982	The Sword and the Sorcerer	Princess Alana	
1983	Touched	Jennifer	
1989	Time Trackers	R.J. Craig	
1990	Legacy	Eliza Williams	
2016	Tom	Mother	Short, completed

=== Television ===
Year	Title	Role	Notes
1971–1974	Search for Tomorrow	Liza Walton Sentell	TV series
1975	Baretta	Carla	"The Coppelli Oath"
1975	Crime Club	Pam Agostino	TV movie
1975	Hawaii Five-O	Elena Mendoza	"The Waterfront Steal"
1976	Medical Center	Sharon	"You Can't Annul My Baby"
1976	At Ease!	Stacy Ramsey	TV short
1976	Visions	Ruth Schwartz	"The Great Cherub Knitwear Strike"
1977	The Six Million Dollar Man	Little Deer	"To Catch the Eagle"
1977	Something for Joey	Jean Cappelletti	TV movie
1977	Barnaby Jones	Julie Enright	"Run Away to Terror"
1977	Mary White	Mary White	TV movie
1978	Having Babies III	Dawn	TV movie
1978	Are You in the House Alone?	Gail Osborne	TV movie
1980	Mother and Daughter: The Loving War	Renie	TV movie
1980	Rappaccini's Daughter	Beatrice	TV movie
1981	No Place to Hide	Amy Manning	TV movie
1981	Manions of America	Maureen O'Brian	TV miniseries
1982	The Blue and the Gray	Kathy Reynolds	TV miniseries
1982–1984	Dynasty	Kirby Anders	Series regular
1984	Glitter	Princess Lisa	TV series, 1 episode: 2 “Trouble in Paradise”
1985	Deadly Messages	Laura Daniels	TV movie
1985	Murder, She Wrote	Mary Carver	"Funeral at Fifty-Mile"
1986	Blacke's Magic	Carla Gasparini	"Breathing Room"
1987	Cloud Waltzing	Meredith Tolliver	TV movie
1987–1988	The Bronx Zoo	Mary Caitlin Callahan	Main role
1989	Murder, She Wrote	Maria Deschier	"When the Fat Lady Sings"
1991	Dynasty: The Reunion	Kirby Anders	TV miniseries
1991	Danger Team	Cheryl Singer	TV movie

== Awards and nominations ==
Year	Award	Category	Title of work	Result
1980	Golden Globe	Best Actress in a Supporting Role - Motion Picture	Promises in the Dark	Nominated
