= Elizabeth Hoffman Honness =

American novelist

Elizabeth Hoffman Honness McKaughan (June 29, 1904 – 2003), better known as Elizabeth Honness, was an American writer, poet, and writer. Honness authored children's books in the mystery genre. During her career, she published 21 books between 1936 and 1983. Researching archeology for her novels, Honness traveled throughout Italy, Guatemala, and Mexico. She studied the Greco-Roman, Mayan, Etruscan, Nuragic, and Aztec cultures.

== Early life and education ==
Honness was born to George Gill Honness and Mary Van Syckle Leigh in Boonton, New Jersey on June 29, 1904. She grew up in the Catskill Mountains area of southeastern New York. Her father worked as the civil engineer in charge of the Reservoir Department of New York City. Honness attended the Beard School in Orange, New Jersey (now Morristown-Beard School). In her freshman year at the school, she created a drawing that made the roll of honor at St. Nicholas magazine, a children's magazine. Following high school, Honness completed her bachelor's degree in English at Skidmore College in Saratoga Springs, New York in 1926. During her studies, Honness penned a poem selected for the anthology Poets of the Future published by the Stratford Company in Boston, Massachusetts.

In 1931, Honness returned to Skidmore to read selections of her poetry set to music to an audience at College Hall. She read from her published volume titled Poems from Beyond the Hill. Honness later served as an alumnae member of Skidmore College's board of trustees for seven years (1937-1944). She also served as a secretary and class agent for her graduating class. In 1987, the Skidmore College Alumni Association awarded Honness their Distinguished Achievement Award to recognize professional and personal accomplishments.

== Writing career and legacy ==
Honness served as the managing editor of American Girl, a magazine for teenage girls published by the Girl Scouts of the USA, for eight years (1934–1942). While working there, she exhibited a watercolor painting at a 1942 exhibition by Girl Scouts staff at Riverside Museum in New York City. The exhibition helped promote art instruction for girl scouts.

During the 1920s and 1930s, Honness wrote poetry for periodicals that included Scribner's, Town & Country, and Commonweal. She also wrote advertising copy for Century Company, Macmillan Company, and Shelton Looms between 1927 and 1934. Honness published her first children's books in 1936 and 1937, and she continued writing children's books until the 1970s. After moving to Philadelphia, Pennsylvania in 1942, she switched from writing fiction for younger children to writing middle grade mysteries (8 to 12 years old).

The Children's Literature Research Collection at the Free Library of Philadelphia houses typescripts, galley proofs, and engraver's proofs for several of Honness' books, which she published between 1957 and 1966. The library staff extemporaneously interviewed her and fellow authors Carolyn Haywood and Donald Cooke in 1953 and 1958.

== Family ==
Honness married publisher Jesse Alfred McKaughan in 1936. He worked as the publicity and advertising manager of Reynal & Hitchcock. They had one child, Molly McKaughan. Taking after her mother, Molly McKaughan worked as a writer and editor first for The Paris Review, New York Magazine, and a number of short-lived monthlies. She then worked as a freelance writer and authored The Biological Clock in 1987. From 1998 to 2016, Molly McKaughan was a senior officer at the Robert Wood Johnson Foundation, where she directed their Program Results Reporting Unit. In 2019, she published "Recovering Myself: A Memoir in Poetry."

Honness's ancestors helped found the town of Clinton, New Jersey in Hunterdon County. Her grandfather, Bennet Van Syckle Leigh, headed Clinton National Bank, the first bank in the town. Clinton's town hall once served as the home of Honness's grandmother. Leigh Street in Clinton bears the family name.

== Works ==
- Poems from Beyond the Hill (J.W Hibbert, 1930)
- The Tail of the Sorry Sorrel Horse (1936)
- Sammy Squirrel Goes to Town (1937)
- Did You Ever? (1940, illustrated by Pelagie Doane)
- Belinda Balloon and the Big Wind (1940, with Pelagie Doane )
- The Flight of Fancy (1941)
- The Great Gold Piece Mystery (1944)
- People of the Promise (1949)
- Mystery of the Diamond Necklace (1954)
- Mystery at the Doll Hospital (1955)
- Mystery of the Auction Trunk (1956)
- Mystery in the Square Tower (1957)
- Mystery of the Wooden Indian (1958)
- We are His People (1959)
- Mystery of the Secret Message (1961)
- Mystery of the Hidden Face (1963)
- Mystery of the Pirate's Ghost (1966)
- Mystery at the Villa Caprice (1969)
- Mystery of the Maya Jade (1971)
- The Etruscans: An Unsolved Mystery (1972)
- The Spy at Tory Hole (1975)
- A Long Look Back (1983, self-published, written for her grand children)
