= The Bronx Zoo (TV series) =

American drama television series

- Genre: Drama
- Created by: Gary David Goldberg
- Developed by: Patricia Jones; Donald Reiker
- Starring: Edward Asner; Kathleen Beller; Kathryn Harrold; Jerry Levine; Nicholas Pryor; Mykelti Williamson; David Wilson
- Composer: Gary Scott
- Country of origin: United States
- Original language: English
- No. of seasons: 2
- No. of episodes: 21 (1 unaired)

Production
- Running time: 60 minutes
- Production companies: Ubu Productions; Paramount Television

Original release
- Network: NBC
- Release: March 19, 1987 – June 29, 1988

The Bronx Zoo is an American drama television series that was directed by Allan Arkush and Paul Lynch that aired on NBC from March 19, 1987, to June 29, 1988. It lasted two seasons before cancellation.

== Plot ==
Benjamin Harrison High School is set in the Bronx. Principal Joe Danzig (Edward Asner) does his best to maintain optimism, while dealing with the lack of motivation and direction of his staff.

== Cast ==
- Edward Asner as Principal Joe Danzig
- Kathleen Beller as Mary Caitlin Callahan
- Jerry Levine as Matthew Littman
- Nicholas Pryor as Jack Feldspar
- Mykelti Williamson as Gus Butterfield
- David Wilson as Harry Barnes
- Kathryn Harrold as Sara Newhouse

== Episodes ==
=== Season 1 (1987) ===
No. overall	No. in season	Title	Directed by	Written by	Original release date
1	1	"Signs of Life"	Allan Arkush	Story by : Johnny Dawkins; Teleplay by : Bruce Helford & Elia Katz	March 19, 1987
2	2	"Changes"	Win Phelps	Kathy McCormick	March 25, 1987
3	3	"Small Victories"	Allan Arkush	Patricia Jones & Donald Reiker	April 1, 1987
4	4	"Conspicuous by Their Abstinence"	Donald Reiker	Elia Katz & Bruce Helford	April 8, 1987
5	5	"The Moral Equation"	Alexander Singer	Johnny Dawkins	April 16, 1987
6	6	"Runaway Hearts"	Allan Arkush	Story by : Bruce Helford & Elia Katz; Teleplay by : Daniel Freudenberger	April 22, 1987
7	7	"The Power of a Lie"	Win Phelps	Kathy McCormick	April 29, 1987
8	8	"Lost and Found"	Debbie Allen	Bruce Helford	May 6, 1987

=== Season 2 (1987–88) ===
No. overall	No. in season	Title	Directed by	Written by	Original release date
9	1	"It's Hard to Be a Saint in the City"	Donald Reiker	Story by : Bruce Helford & Frederick Rappaport; Teleplay by : Patricia Jones & Donald Reiker & Stuart Rosenberg	December 9, 1987
10	2	"The Long Grey Line"	Win Phelps	Story by : Patricia Jones & Donald Reiker; Teleplay by : Kathy McCormick	January 20, 1988
11	3	"Truancy Blues"	Paul Lynch	Story by : Frederick Rappaport; Teleplay by : Steve Katz	March 24, 1988
12	4	"Behind Closed Doors"	Paul Lynch	Story by : Patricia Jones & Donald Reiker; Teleplay by : Joanne Pagliaro	March 30, 1988
13	5	"Career Day"	Win Phelps	Story by : Bruce Helford; Teleplay by : Steve Johnson	April 6, 1988
14	6	"Ties That Bind"	Michael Ray Rhodes	Story by : Frederick Rappaport; Teleplay by : Stephen Katz & Stuart Rosenberg	April 13, 1988
15	7	"The Gospel Truth"	James Quinn	Patricia Jones & Donald Reiker	April 20, 1988
16	8	"If All the World's a Stage, Where's My Dressing Room?"	Victor Lobi	Story by : Bruce Helford & Patricia Jones & Donald Reiker; Teleplay by : Frederick Rappaport & Ira Steven Behr	June 1, 1988
17	9	"When I Paint My Masterpiece"	Michael Vejar	Story by : Bruce Helford; Teleplay by : Patricia Jones & Donald Reiker	June 8, 1988
18	10	"Crossroads"	Robert Becker	Frederick Rappaport	June 15, 1988
19	11	"On the Land, on the Sea and in the Halls"	Mimi Leder	Story by : Frederick Rappaport & Ira Steven Behr; Teleplay by : Bruce Helford & Frederick Rappaport	June 22, 1988
20	12	"A Day in the Life"	Win Phelps	Story by : Patricia Jones & Donald Reiker & Bruce Helford; Teleplay by : Ira Steven Behr & Frederick Rappaport	June 29, 1988
21	13	"Unnatural Selection"	Robert Becker	Story by : Ira Steven Behr & Frederick Rappaport and Josephine Cummings & Richard Yalem; Teleplay by : Bruce Helford & Patricia Jones & Donald Reiker	Unaired
