= Touched (1983 film) =

1983 film directed by John Flynn

- Directed by: John Flynn
- Written by: Lyle Kessler
- Produced by: Barclay Lottimer; Dirk Petersmann
- Starring: Robert Hays; Kathleen Beller; Ned Beatty
- Cinematography: Fred Murphy
- Edited by: Harry Keramidas
- Music by: Shirley Walker
- Production company: Lorimar Film Entertainment
- Release date: October 1983
- Running time: 93 minutes
- Country: United States
- Language: English
- Budget: $5 million

Touched is a 1983 American romantic drama film directed by John Flynn starring Robert Hays and Kathleen Beller.

== Premise ==
Two residents of a mental institution, a man named Daniel and a woman named Jennifer, are not as ill as the psychiatrists at the institution perceive them to be. Daniel and Jennifer escape to make lives for themselves together in the world at large.

== Cast ==
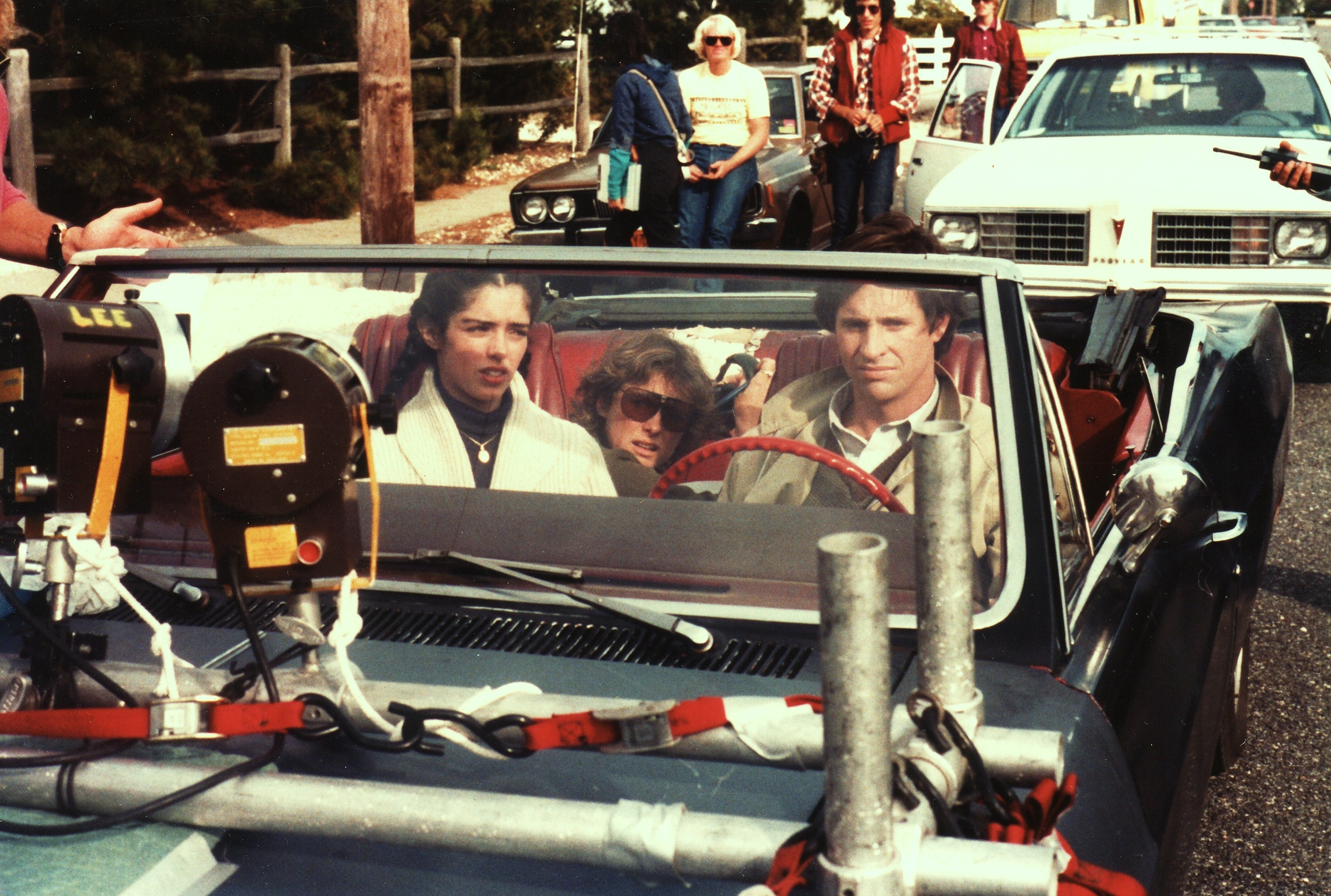
Kathleen Beller and Robert Hays filming Touched in Wildwood, New Jersey

- Robert Hays as Daniel
- Kathleen Beller as Jennifer
- Ned Beatty as Herbie
- Gilbert Lewis as Ernie
- Lyle Kessler as Timothy
- Farnham Scott as Thomas
- Meg Myles as Jennifer's Mother
- Mady Kaplan as Arlene
- E. Brian Dean as Dr. Willoughby
- Victoria Boothby as Adele
- Clarence Felder as Ralph

== Production ==
Touched was filmed under the working title Some Sunny Day. It features extensive scenes shot on the boardwalk in Wildwood, New Jersey, including locations on and near Morey's Piers, during the end of the summer season and the beginning of the off-season in 1982. Other amusement piers, including Hunt's Pier, can be seen in the backgrounds of scenes.

== Music ==
In addition to the instrumental score by Shirley Walker, the film also features the love ballad "Find Me", written by David Shire and Carol Connors, and sung by Laura Branigan, featured on her second hit album Branigan 2.
