= Margaret Vandercook =

American writer (1877–1958)

- Born: Margaret O'Bannon Womack; January 12, 1877; Louisville, Kentucky, U.S.
- Died: February 7, 1958 (aged 81)
- Occupation: Writer
- Spouse: John Filkin Vandercook (m. 1900; died 1908)
- Children: 1
- Parent(s): Joel Mayo Womack; Nannie Gibson O'Bannon
- Writing career
- Pen name: Margaret Love Sanderson
- Genre: Children's literature

Margaret O'Bannon Womack Vandercook (January 12, 1877 – February 7, 1958) was an American writer of children's literature.

== Personal life ==
Daughter of Joel Mayo Womack and Nannie Gibson (O'Bannon) Womack, she was born in Louisville, Kentucky, where she attended both public and private schools. In 1900 she married John Filkin Vandercook, who later became the first president of the United Press Association. He died in 1908. They had one son, John Womack Vandercook. Margaret spent her summers in Leonardo, New Jersey and winters in Gramercy Park, New York, but during her husband's lifetime she also spent several years living in Europe.

== Professional life ==
Margaret Vandercook did not become a professional writer until after her husband's death, but has since been described as the queen of Camp Fire writers, writing 21 Camp Fire novels under her own name as well as the pseudonym "Margaret Love Sanderson." The pseudonym of Margaret Love Sanderson was also used by Emma Keats Speed Sampson, author of the Miss Minerva books. In addition to the Camp Fire Girls series, Margaret is also known for her other girls series books which include the Ranch Girls series, Red Cross Girls series, and Girl Scouts series. Additional works include stories, articles and poems for Harper's Bazar, Delineator, Pearson's Magazine, Book News Monthly, Paris Modes, and many other publications. She was also a member of the Louisville Kentucky Authors' Club.

== Works ==
=== 'The Camp Fire Girls' series ===
The Camp Fire Girls at Sunrise Hill (1913)
The Camp Fire Girls Amid the Snows (1913)
The Camp Fire Girls in the Outside World (1914)
The Camp Fire Girls Across the Seas (1914)
The Camp Fire Girls' Careers (1915)
The Camp Fire Girls in After Years (1915)
The Camp Fire Girls on the Edge of the Desert (1917)
The Camp Fire Girls at the End of the Trail (1917)
The Camp Fire Girls Behind the Lines (1918)
The Camp Fire Girls on the Field of Honor (1918)
The Camp Fire Girls in Glorious France (1919)
The Camp Fire Girls in Merrie England (1920)
The Camp Fire Girls by the Blue Lagoon (1921)
The Camp Fire Girls at Half Moon Lake (1921)

=== 'The Camp Fire Girls' series as Margaret Love Sanderson ===
The Camp Fire Girls at Hillside (1913)
The Camp Fire Girls at Pine-tree Camp (1914)
The Camp Fire Girls at Top o' the World (1916)
The Camp Fire Girls at Lookout Pass (1917)
The Camp Fire Girls at Driftwood Heights (1918)
The Camp Fire Girls in Old Kentucky (1919)
The Camp Fire Girls on a Yacht (1920)
The Camp Fire Girls on Hurricane Island (1921)

=== 'The Ranch Girls' series ===
The Ranch Girls at Rainbow Lodge (1911)
The Ranch Girls' Pot of Gold (1912)
The Ranch Girls at Boarding School (1913)
The Ranch Girls in Europe (1914)
The Ranch Girls Home Again (1915)
The Ranch Girls and Their Great Adventure (1917)
The Ranch Girls and Their Heart's Desire (1920)
The Ranch Girls and the Silver Arrow (1921)
The Ranch Girls and the Mystery of Three Roads (1924)

=== 'Red Cross Girls' series ===
The Red Cross Girls in the British Trenches (1916)
The Red Cross Girls on the French Firing Line (1916)
The Red Cross Girls in Belgium (1916)
The Red Cross Girls with the Russian Army (1916)
The Red Cross Girls with the Italian Army (1917)
The Red Cross Girls Under the Stars and Stripes (1917)
The Red Cross Girls Afloat with the Flag (1918)
The Red Cross Girls with the U.S. Marines (1919)
The Red Cross Girls with Pershing to Victory (1919)
The Red Cross Girls at the National Capital (1920)

=== 'Girl Scouts' series ===
The Girl Scouts of Eagle's Wing (1921)
The Girl Scouts in Beechwood Forest (1921)
The Girl Scouts of the Round Table (1921)
The Girl Scouts in Mystery Valley (1923)
The Girl Scouts and the Open Road (1923)

=== Other works ===
The Loves of Ambrose (1914)
Poems Past and Present (1948)
Captain Becky's Masquerade (1912)
