= Promises in the Dark (film) =

1979 film by Jerome Hellman

- Theatrical release poster
- Directed by: Jerome Hellman
- Written by: Loring Mandel
- Produced by: Jerome Hellman
- Starring: Marsha Mason; Ned Beatty; Susan Clark; Michael Brandon; Kathleen Beller
- Cinematography: Adam Holender
- Edited by: Bob Wyman
- Music by: Leonard Rosenman
- Production company: Jerome Hellman Productions
- Distributed by: Orion Pictures (thru Warner Bros.)
- Release date: November 2, 1979
- Running time: 118 minutes
- Country: United States
- Language: English
- Budget: $5 million

Promises in the Dark is a 1979 American drama film produced and directed by Jerome Hellman and written by Loring Mandel. The film stars Marsha Mason, Ned Beatty, Susan Clark, Michael Brandon, Kathleen Beller and Paul Clemens. It was released by Warner Bros. and Orion Pictures on November 2, 1979.

For their performances, Marsha Mason earned a nomination for Best Performance in a Motion Picture – Drama and Kathleen Beller received a nomination for Best Supporting Performance in a Motion Picture – Drama, Comedy or Musicals at the 37th Golden Globe Awards. Mason was also nominated that same year for the Best Performance in a Motion Picture – Comedy or Musical Golden Globe award for her work in Chapter Two.

== Plot ==
Numbed by career demands and a recent divorce, Dr. Alexandra Kendall hides behind a hard shell of professional detachment. Then she treats Buffy Koenig, a dying 17-year-old cancer patient who reawakens Kendall to life's possibilities. Eventually, Buffy's deteriorating condition forces Dr. Kendall to weigh the consequences of keeping a promise that she had made.

== Cast ==
- Marsha Mason as Dr. Alexandra Kendall
- Ned Beatty as Bud Koenig
- Susan Clark as Fran Koenig
- Michael Brandon as Dr. Jim Sandman
- Kathleen Beller as Elizabeth (Buffy) Koenig
- Paul Clemens as Gerry Hulin
- Donald Moffat as Dr. Walter McInerny
- Philip Sterling as Dr. Frucht
- Bonnie Bartlett as Nurse Farber
- James Noble as Dr. Blankenship
- Arthur Rosenberg as Emergency Room Doctor
- Peggy McCay as Miss Pritikin
- Robert Doran as Alan
- Lenora May as Sue
- Alexandra Johnson as Ellie
- Fran Bennett as Emergency Room Nurse
- Eloise Hardt as Woman in Restaurant
- Bernie Kuby as Tony in Bud's Office
- Karen Anders as Secretary in Bud's Office
- Edith Fields as Mrs. Gans
- Alice Beardsley as Mrs. Keyes

== Production ==
Writer Loring Mandel conceived the story for Promises in the Dark while he was employed as head writer for the daytime drama Love of Life. When the soap's executive producer Darryl Hickman rejected the idea, Mandel quit the show and developed the plot into a feature screenplay.

The project was initially in development at United Artists, with Elizabeth Ashley cast in the starring role, John Schlesinger set to direct and Arnold Schulman and Jerome Hellman producing. However, with the exception of Hellman, no one remained with the project, which was inactive for many years. Arthur Krim, chairman of the newly formed Orion Pictures, selected the script as one of the company's first projects on the strength of Hellman's previous productions, such as Midnight Cowboy and Coming Home. In addition to serving as producer, Hellman directed the film.

Promises in the Dark was filmed partly on location at Manchester Memorial Hospital in Manchester, Connecticut.
