= Mary E. Holland =

American detective

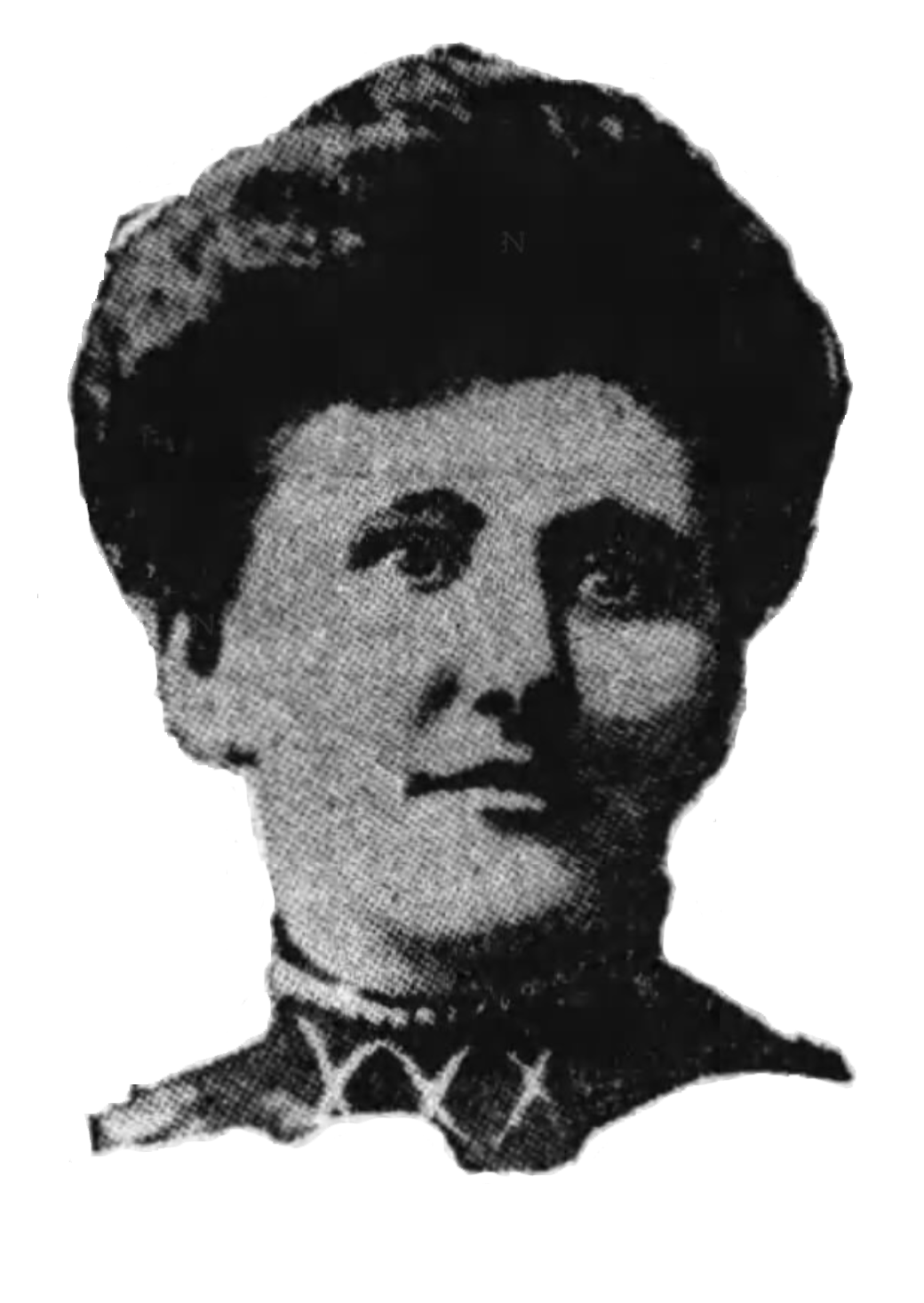
- Holland in 1909
- Born: Mary E. Troxel; February 25, 1868; Galena, Illinois
- Died: March 27, 1915 (aged 47); Chicago, Illinois
- Occupation: Detective
- Years active: 1904 - 1915
- Known for: Early advocate of fingerprint evidence in U.S.
- Spouse: Philip Cosmore Holland

Mary E. Holland (February 25, 1868 - March 27, 1915) was an American detective who became an early advocate for fingerprint identification in criminal investigations. She was one of the expert witnesses in the first case in which a criminal was convicted by fingerprint evidence in the United States. She "single-handedly was responsible for the accelerated acceptance of the Henry system" for classifying fingerprints in the United States. She was once called "the most noted woman criminologist in the world."

== Biography ==
Mary E. Troxel was born February 25, 1868, in Galena, Illinois, the daughter of Elias Daniel Troxel and Sarah Troxel (nee Miller). Her father, a Methodist Minister, had met Allan Pinkerton while in the military, and became an admirer of his work. He collected detective books, which Mary would read, sparking her interest in detective work.

Mary Troxel married Philip Cosmore Holland in 1888. Beginning in the 1880s in Cedar Rapids, Iowa, Mr. Holland published The Detective, a magazine for law enforcement professionals that ran photos of wanted criminals and cataloged criminological supplies. Mary was the co-editor. When the magazine became successful they moved their offices to Chicago.

Mary Holland also ran the Holland Detective Agency with offices in the Schiller Building in Chicago. As a private detective she sometimes consulted on cases with the Chicago police. In one dramatic case, she was hired to assist in a lease dispute and she ended up in a gunfight over possession of a saloon.

Sgt. John K. Ferrier of Scotland Yard attended the 1904 World's Fair in St. Louis as part of the security for an exhibit of Queen Victoria's jewels. He also had an exhibit and taught classes regarding the then-novel Henry Classification System for fingerprints. Mary Holland met Ferrier there and attended classes with him for seven and a half months. She also travelled to London for further training and there she passed proficiency tests administered by Scotland Yard.

She became an advocate for forensic fingerprint identification and began training local police departments around the U.S. to use it. According to Hawthorne she was the "strongest proponent" of the Henry system against some rivals, and was responsible for its general acceptance throughout the U.S.

In 1906 Holland trained personnel from the U.S. Navy in fingerprinting, which adopted the system.

There is no work a man does that a woman cannot do just as well. My belief in my sex, its brain and ability is strong and deep-rooted.

— Mary E. Holland, Detroit Free Press, 1908

In the 1910 murder trial of Thomas Jennings in Chicago, Holland was one of several experts called to verify the fingerprint evidence used to convict the accused. The conviction, upheld on appeal, was the first time fingerprint evidence was used to convict a suspect in the United States. Jennings was executed on February 16, 1912.

Holland also studied under Alphonse Bertillon, who had a system of identifying suspects by measurements and classification of mugshots. Holland became the American agent for the Bertillon system and trained others on it and sold it to local police departments.

Mary Holland died on March 27, 1915 at age 47. She died of pneumonia following a surgery. She was buried at Mount Hope Cemetery in Chicago.

== In popular media ==
- Holland was the inspiration for the "girl detective" Miss Madelyn Mack in a series of stories by Hugh C. Weir.
- Madelyn Mack was the main character in two silent films by the Kalem Company, and played by Alice Joyce. Both films are now believed to be lost.
