= Margaret Penrose =

House pseudonym used by the Stratemeyer Syndicate

Margaret Penrose was a house pseudonym used by the Stratemeyer Syndicate as the author of three girls' book series published by Cupples & Leon.

The name Margaret Penrose was used for:

- The Dorothy Dale series – 1908 to 1924, 13 volumes
- The Motor Girls series – 1910 to 1917, 10 volumes
- The Radio Girls series – 1922 to 1924, 4 volumes
- Camp Fire Girls books – renamed reprints of The Radio Girls series, 4 volumes

The Dorothy Dale series was ghostwritten by the following authors: Lilian Garis volumes 1 – 8, 11; W. Bert Foster volumes 9, 10, 12; and Elizabeth Duffield Ward volume 13.
