= Bobbsey Twins =

Series of American children's novels

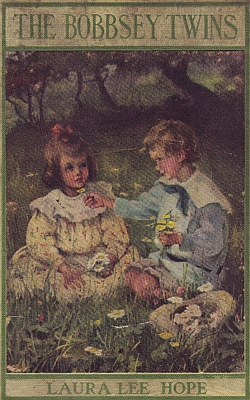
Cover of The Bobbsey Twins, circa 1908

The Bobbsey Twins are the principal characters of what was, for 75 years, the Stratemeyer Syndicate's longest-running series of American children's novels, written under the pseudonym Laura Lee Hope. The first of 72 books was published in 1904, the last in 1979, with a separate series of 30 books published from 1987 through 1992. The books related the adventures of the children of the upper-middle-class Bobbsey family, which included two sets of fraternal twins: Bert and Nan, who were eight years old, and Flossie and Freddie, who were four when the first book was written. The two sets of twins aged as the series went on. As the series continued, the two sets of twins were perpetually aged at 12 and 6.

== Authorship ==
Edward Stratemeyer is believed to be the writer of the first volume in its original form in 1904. When the original series was brought to its conclusion in 1979, it reached a total of 72 volumes. At least two attempts to restart the series were launched after this, but neither effort saw the popularity the original series achieved.

Speculation that Stratemeyer also wrote the second and third volumes of the series is believed to be incorrect; these books are attributed to Lilian Garis, wife of Howard Garis, credited with volumes 4–28 and 41. Elizabeth Ward is credited with volumes 29–35, while Harriet Stratemeyer Adams is credited with 36–38, 39 (with Camilla McClave), 40, 42, 43 (with Andrew Svenson), and 44–48. Volumes 49–52 are attributed to Andrew Svenson, while 53–59, and the 1960s rewrites of 1–4, 7, 11–13, and 17, are attributed to June Dunn. Grace Grote is regarded as the author of 60–67 and the rewrites of 14 and 18–20, and Nancy Axelrad is credited with 68–72. Of the 1960s rewrites not mentioned, volumes 5 and 16 are credited to Mary Donahoe, 6 and 25 to Patricia Doll, 8–10 and 15 to Bonnibel Weston, and 24 to Margery Howard.

== Main characters ==
- Mr. Richard Bobbsey, the owner of a lumber yard in Lakeport
- Mrs. Mary Bobbsey, his wife, a stay-at-home mom
- Nan Bobbsey, their elder daughter, Bert's twin. She has dark hair and dark eyes.
- Bert Bobbsey, their elder son, Nan's twin. He has dark hair and dark eyes.
- Freddie Bobbsey, their younger son, Flossie's twin. He has blond hair and blue eyes.
- Flossie Bobbsey, their younger daughter, Freddie's twin
- Dinah Johnson, the Bobbseys' cook, Sam's wife
- Sam Johnson, the Bobbseys' handyman, Dinah's husband
- Snoop, the Bobbseys' cat. (Snoop starts as a male cat, but is incorrectly changed to "she" after being lost to a circus in the fourth volume of the series.)
- Downy, the Bobbseys' duck
- Snap, the Bobbseys' dog
- Waggo, the Bobbseys' other dog
- Danny Rugg, the school bully
- Charlie Mason, Bert's friend
- Nellie Parks, Nan's friend
- Grace Lavine, Nan's friend

== Plots ==
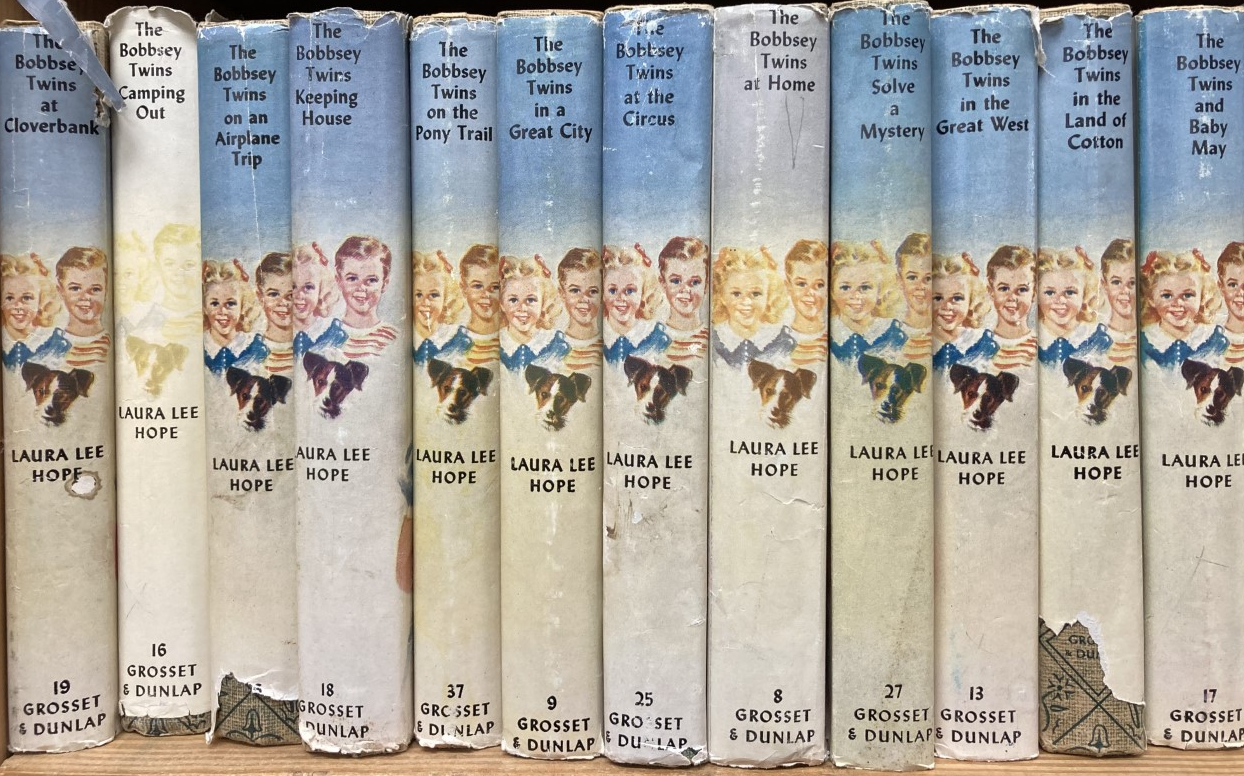
Set of Bobbsey Twins books

In the original editions, the first books in the series (like those in previous Stratemeyer series) took place in a clear chronology, with the characters aging as time passed. The Bobbsey Twins: Merry Days Indoors and Out took place over the course of a school year, with Nan and Bert described as eight years old and Freddie and Flossie four. The second book, The Bobbsey Twins in the Country is set at the beginning of the following summer. The second part of the summer is chronicled in The Bobbsey Twins at the Seashore, which is written as a direct sequel to the previous book, tying up some plot threads. The fourth book, The Bobbsey Twins at School, begins the next autumn, with Nan and Bert "nearly nine years old" and Freddie and Flossie "almost five." Editors at the Stratemeyer Syndicate quickly realized, at this rate, their young heroes would quickly age beyond their readership, so the later books in the series (and revised editions) take place in a sort of chronological stasis, with the older twins perpetually 12 years old and the younger set 6.

The earliest Bobbsey books were mainly episodic strings of adventures; with the growing popularity of the Hardy Boys and Nancy Drew, detective plots began to dominate the series. Few of the mysteries involved violent crime, and quite a few did not involve any crime.

While many of the early volumes were constructed from whole cloth, with little or no connection to the real world, by 1917 (The Bobbsey Twins in a Great City, vol. 9, rewritten in 1960 as The Bobbsey Twins' Search in the Great City) they visit real places, and by the 1950s (The Bobbsey Twins at Pilgrim Rock vol. 50), those visits to real places were as well-researched as any fictional visits to real places. By 1971, when the Bobbseys visited Colonial Williamsburg (The Bobbsey Twins' Red White and Blue Mystery, vol. 64), real places were depicted in meticulous detail, down to the names of well-known hotels and restaurants (and, in that particular case, the color of Colonial Williamsburg shuttle buses).

It is said vol. 68, The Bobbsey Twins on the Sun-Moon Cruise, was the result of a research trip for a proposed Nancy Drew book: Harriet Stratemeyer Adams and Nancy Axelrad (her personal assistant at the time) took an eclipse cruise but, when they returned, the publisher was more interested in a new Bobbsey title.

== Post-1960 rewrites ==
In 1960, the Stratemeyer syndicate rewrote most of the older volumes, many of which became almost unrecognizable in the process. This was concurrent with the release of a new edition of the series, with picture covers, no dust jackets, and a lavender spine and back cover (replacing earlier various green bindings). Many of the cover paintings were dust-jacket paintings added in the 1950s (for earlier versions, a single common dust-jacket painting was used throughout an edition), but most were new with the "purple" edition. In all, twenty were completely rewritten, all but two with modernized titles, while sixteen were never released in this edition, evidently deemed to be dated beyond repair.

Most of the rewrites were motivated by changing technology (automobiles replacing horses and buggies) or changing social standards, particularly in how Sam and Dinah, the Black cook and handyman, were portrayed. The Bobbsey Twins and Baby May received the most extreme rewrite; it is a story about the Bobbsey family's adventures searching for the parents of a foundling baby. Since, by the 1960s, sheer numbers of government agencies rendered the original story utterly implausible, an entirely new novel was written about the twins' adventures with a baseball-playing baby elephant (The Bobbsey Twins' Adventures with Baby May). This, however, had a ripple effect, because the original The Bobbsey Twins at Cloverbank was a sequel to the original Baby May. Thus, a second book, The Bobbsey Twins and the Four-Leaf Clover Mystery, was written. It incorporates little material from the original.

== New Bobbsey Twins ==
Starting in 1987, a numbered series of paperback originals branded The New Bobbsey Twins were released by Minstrel Books, an imprint of Pocket Books. Featuring all-new stories, the series ended with volume 30, The Mystery of the Mixed-Up Mall, in 1992.

== Analysis ==
In her book The Rhetoric of Character in Children's Literature, Maria Nikolajeva refers to the twins as a "simple duplication of protagonists". Bobbie Ann Mason, in The Girl Sleuth: A Feminist Guide, differs, agreeing the books afford the child-reader an opportunity to imagine "a union with someone just like her, but of the opposite sex", but arguing the distinction between boy-twin and girl-twin "makes a world of difference": Bert "acts out his manhood by winning contests and beating the town bully, Danny Rugg", while his twin Nan – throughout the series "too old for dolls and pranks, too young for boys and barred from their games" – spends most of her time in the books "wagging her finger at Freddie and appearing to enjoy it", acting as "mini-parent, non-child, serious-minded little manipulator".

== List of 72 original books and rewrites ==
KEY: © = copyright renewal only; ET= expanded text; DR= documented revision; UR= undocumented revision; NE= new edition; CR=complete rewrite
Volume	Original Published Title	Year of Original Publication	Revision History	New Title	Year of Retitled Publication
1	The Bobbsey Twins, or Merry Days Indoors and Out	1904	ET 1928, NE 1950, CR 1961	The Bobbsey Twins of Lakeport	1961
2	The Bobbsey Twins in the Country	1907	NE 1950, CR 1961	The Bobbsey Twins' Adventure in the Country	1961
3	The Bobbsey Twins at the Seashore	1907	NE 1950, CR 1961	The Bobbsey Twins: The Secret at the Seashore	1961
4	The Bobbsey Twins at School	1913	UR 1941, CR 1962	The Bobbsey Twins' Mystery at School	1962
5	The Bobbsey Twins at Snow Lodge	1913	© 1941, CR 1960	The Bobbsey Twins: The Mystery at Snow Lodge	1960
6	The Bobbsey Twins on a Houseboat	1915	© 1943, CR 1955		
7	The Bobbsey Twins at Meadow Brook	1915	© 1943, CR 1963	The Bobbsey Twins' Mystery at Meadow Brook	1963
8	The Bobbsey Twins at Home	1916	© 1944, CR 1960	The Bobbsey Twins' Big Adventure at Home	1960
9	The Bobbsey Twins in a Great City	1917	UR 1945, CR 1960	The Bobbsey Twins' Search in the Great City	1960
10	The Bobbsey Twins on Blueberry Island	1917	© 1945, CR 1959		
11	The Bobbsey Twins on the Deep Blue Sea	1918		The Bobbsey Twins' Mystery on the Deep Blue Sea	1965
12	The Bobbsey Twins in Washington	1919	© 1947, CR 1962	The Bobbsey Twins' Adventure in Washington	1962
13	The Bobbsey Twins in the Great West	1920	© 1948, CR 1966	The Bobbsey Twins' Visit to the Great West	1966
14	The Bobbsey Twins at Cedar Camp	1921	© 1949, CR 1967	The Bobbsey Twins: the Cedar Camp Mystery	1967
15	The Bobbsey Twins at the County Fair	1922	CR 1960	The Bobbsey Twins: the County Fair Mystery	1960
16	The Bobbsey Twins Camping Out	1923	UR 1955		
17	The Bobbsey Twins and Baby May	1924	CR 1968	The Bobbsey Twins' Adventures with Baby May	1968
18	The Bobbsey Twins Keeping House	1925	CR 1968	The Bobbsey Twins': The Play House Secret	1968
19	The Bobbsey Twins at Cloverbank	1926	CR 1968	The Bobbsey Twins: the Four Leaf Clover Mystery	1968
20	The Bobbsey Twins at Cherry Corners	1927	CR 1971	The Bobbsey Twins: the Mystery at Cherry Corners	1971
21	The Bobbsey Twins and their Schoolmates	1928			
22	The Bobbsey Twins Treasure Hunting	1929			
23	The Bobbsey Twins at Spruce Lake	1930			
24	The Bobbsey Twins' Wonderful Secret	1931	CR 1962	The Bobbsey Twins' Wonderful Winter Secret	1962
25	The Bobbsey Twins at the Circus	1932	CR 1960	The Bobbsey Twins and the Circus Surprise	1960
26	The Bobbsey Twins on an Airplane Trip	1933			
27	The Bobbsey Twins Solve a Mystery	1932			
28	The Bobbsey Twins on a Ranch	1935			
29	The Bobbsey Twins in Eskimo Land	1936			
30	The Bobbsey Twins in a Radio Play	1937			
31	The Bobbsey Twins at Windmill Cottage	1938			
32	The Bobbsey Twins at Lighthouse Point	1939			
33	The Bobbsey Twins at Indian Hollow	1940			
34	The Bobbsey Twins at the Ice Carnival	1941			
35	The Bobbsey Twins in the Land of Cotton	1942			
36	The Bobbsey Twins in Echo Valley	1943			
37	The Bobbsey Twins on the Pony Trail	1944			
38	The Bobbsey Twins at Mystery Mansion	1945			
39	The Bobbsey Twins at Sugar Maple Hill	1946			
40	The Bobbsey Twins in Mexico	1947			
41	The Bobbsey Twins' Toy Shop	1948			
42	The Bobbsey Twins in Tulip Land	1949			
43	The Bobbsey Twins in Rainbow Valley	1950			
44	The Bobbsey Twins' Own Little Railroad	1951			
45	The Bobbsey Twins at Whitesail Harbor	1952			
46	The Bobbsey Twins and the Horseshoe Riddle	1953			
47	The Bobbsey Twins at Big Bear Pond	1953			
48	The Bobbsey Twins on a Bicycle Trip	1954			
49	The Bobbsey Twins' Own Little Ferryboat	1956			
50	The Bobbsey Twins at Pilgrim Rock	1956			
51	The Bobbsey Twins' Forest Adventure	1957			
52	The Bobbsey Twins at London Tower	1959			
53	The Bobbsey Twins in the Mystery Cave	1960			
54	The Bobbsey Twins in Volcano Land	1961			
55	The Bobbsey Twins: The Goldfish Mystery	1962			
56	The Bobbsey Twins: The Big River Mystery	1963			
57	The Bobbsey Twins: The Greek Hat Mystery	1964			
58	The Bobbsey Twins: The Search for the Green Rooster	1965			
59	The Bobbsey Twins: Their Camel Adventure	1966			
60	The Bobbsey Twins: Mystery of the King's Puppet	1967			
61	The Bobbsey Twins: The Secret of Candy Castle	1968			
62	The Bobbsey Twins: The Doodlebug Mystery	1969			
63	The Bobbsey Twins: The Talking Fox Mystery	1970			
64	The Bobbsey Twins: The Red, White and Blue Mystery	1971			
65	The Bobbsey Twins: Dr. Funnybone's Secret	1972			
66	The Bobbsey Twins: The Tagalong Giraffe	1973			
67	The Bobbsey Twins: The Flying Clown	1974			
68	The Bobbsey Twins: On the Sun-Moon Cruise	1975			
69	The Bobbsey Twins: The Freedom Bell Mystery	1976			
70	The Bobbsey Twins: The Smokey Mountain Mystery	1977			
71	The Bobbsey Twins in a TV Mystery Show	1978			
72	The Bobbsey Twins: The Coral Turtle Mystery	1979			

From Weinstein's Bobbsey Twins Bibliography (list last revised September 18, 1999)

== In other media ==
Re-imagined versions of the Bobbsey twins appear in The CW drama Nancy Drew, an adaptation of another Stratemeyer Syndicate series. In the series, the twins are given the full names of Amanda and Gilbert "Gil" and are respectively played by Aadila Dosani and Praneet Akilla.
