= M.A. Donohue & Co. =

Chicago bindery, printer and publisher

M. A. Donohue & Co.
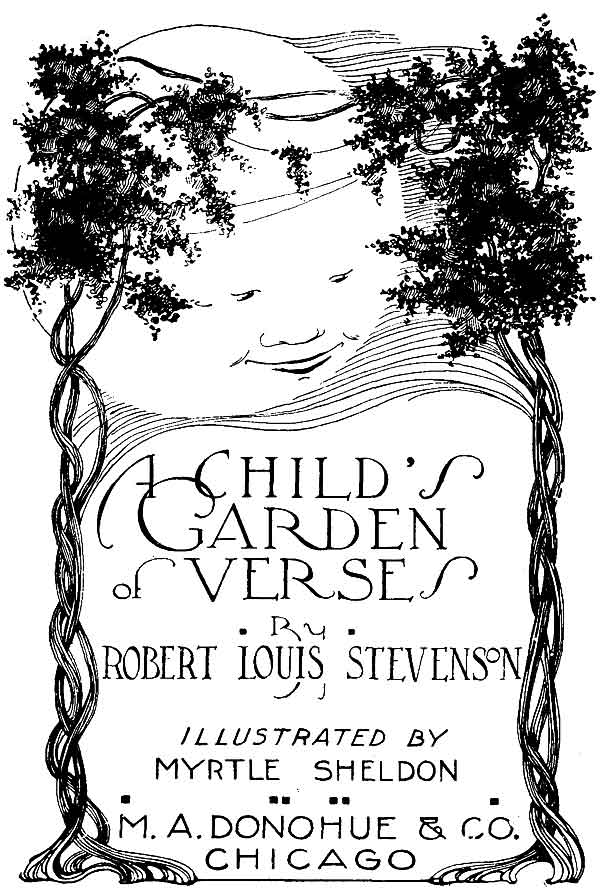
- A Child's Garden of Verses (1916) cover
- Status: Defunct
- Founded: 1861
- Headquarters location: Chicago, Illinois
- Publication types: Books
- Fiction genres: children's literature

M. A. Donohue & Co., was a publisher of children's books in the late 1800s and the first half of the 20th century. Established in Chicago, it had additional offices in New York City.

According to the information compiled by Sid Huttner on The Lucile Project web pages:

M.A. Donohue & Co. based in Chicago, Illinois was established in 1861, initially known as Cox and Donohue, Bookbinders. The publisher's original location was 407-429 Dearborn St. in Chicago's South Loop. The company was known for inexpensive editions of popular works of fiction. It focused on publishing sets and series of books (i.e. "libraries.") Around 1880, the name of the company was changed to Donohue & Henneberry, and in 1901 to M. A. Donohue & Company. It continued in business to the 1960s at 711-727 S. Dearborn St., Chicago.

== Donohue Building ==
The Donohue Building is a historic 19th century building housing the Chicago printing company. It was designed by Julius B. Speyer (1845 - 1916) and built in 1883. It was eventually converted for residential use. The building is on "Printer's Row" on South Dearborn Street. It was the first large factory on Printing House Row. An annex was added on in 1913. In 1979 they became the first of Chicago's factory buildings to be converted to residential lofts. A historical marker for the building is at 712 South Dearborn.

The masonry building design is described as Romanesque with a round arched sandstone and granite entry bay that was originally capped by a tower.

The building has historic vault lights that are largely intact.

For images of the former Donohue Building at 711-727 S. Dearborn St., see the Chicago - Architecture & Cityscape blog listed in the sources below.

== Additional sources ==
Lucile Project web pages:

- M.A. Donohue & Co.Chicago, 1901-
- Donohue & Henneberry (Donohue, Henneberry & Co.) Chicago, 1871-1899

Chicago - Architecture & Cityscape:

- Chicago Architecture & Cityscape - The Donohue Building
