= Margaret Sutton =

American writer

Margaret Sutton biography, c.1944, from flap of Gail Gardner book dust jacket

Margaret Sutton (January 22, 1903 - June 21, 2001) was the pen name of Rachel Beebe, an American author and teacher who is famous as being the author of the Judy Bolton Series of mystery books, 38 volumes published between 1932 and 1967. In addition to this series, she also wrote the Gail Gardner series, The Magic Maker series, Palace Wagon Family, Jemima, Daughter of Daniel Boone, as well as several other books.

== Biography ==
Margaret Sutton was born Rachel Beebe, in Odin, Pennsylvania on January 22, 1903. Her parents were Victor L. Beebe, a historian, musician, and carpenter, and Estella Andrews Beebe. She grew up in Coudersport, near the New York State border. Sutton found a love of storytelling from her mother at an early age. Sutton also loved literature and history, which she probably inherited from her father, who wrote "The History of Potter County."

She attended Rochester Business Institute in New York to become a stenographer. When she graduated, she worked as a secretary and later as a printer. Later, she taught creative writing to adults and many of her students became published authors.

In 1924, she married William Henry Sutton. They had five children together. It wasn't until after she married him, that her writing career began. It started when she wrote stories for William's daughter. Her stories were published in "Picture World," a magazine for children, under the name Rachel B. Sutton. She also wrote book reviews. In 1932, she published her first series book, The Vanishing Shadow, about a girl named Judy Bolton who solves mysteries. The novel was published under a pen name, Margaret Sutton. William died in 1965, and ten years later she married Everett Hunting.

Margaret Sutton and her husband, William, were among the founding members of the South Nassau Unitarian Universalist Congregation in Freeport, N.Y. Additionally, Sutton was an activist in social causes such as fair housing and participated in the historic "March on Washington for Jobs and Freedom" in 1963.

She died at age 98 in Lock Haven, Pennsylvania, as Margaret S. Hunting from her second marriage to Everett Hunting. She died of natural causes. Margaret Sutton wrote (but never published) a religious education curriculum, "Letters to Live By", which was taught in several churches. After her death, two of her daughters, Lindsay Stroh and Marjorie Eckstein, rewrote and updated "Letters to Live By" and Marjorie finished the illustrations a few weeks before her death at age 91 in 2017.

== Judy Bolton ==
The first Judy Bolton book, was published in 1932, called ''The Vanishing Shadow.'' Sutton was best known for writing the Judy Bolton mystery series, which sold more than five million copies. Her Judy Bolton books were advertised as all being based on actual events from Sutton's life. Many of the Judy Bolton stories are based on events from Sutton's hometown, Coudersport, Pennsylvania.

Her earlier Judy Bolton books were illustrated by Pelagie Doane, who also illustrated her Magic Maker books.

The last Judy Bolton book that Sutton published was ''The Secret of the Sand Castle,'' in 1967. The series ended in 1967, before the next book The Strange Likeness could be published. However, In 1997, Linda Joy Singleton privately published Judy Bolton: The Talking Snowman, a new Judy Bolton mystery written by Sutton and Singleton. Sutton began the manuscript for this book in 1980, and years later Singleton finished it with help from Sutton. The incidents in this book placed it between the 3rd and 4th books in the series, leading it to be known as book # 3-1/2.

In 2012, with the permission of Margaret Sutton's family, coauthors Kate Duvall and Beverly Hatfield wrote The Strange Likeness based on Margaret Sutton's original title and conversations with the author and her family. It was edited by Margaret Sutton's youngest daughter, Lindsay Sutton Stroh, and illustrated by another daughter, Marjorie Sutton Eckstein. Published by Applewood Books, the volume is #39 in the Judy Bolton Mystery Series.

== Other publications ==
Sutton wrote many books including the Gail Gardner series; Palace Wagon Family; Jemima, Daughter of Daniel Boone; and The Magic Maker series. Sutton did all her own writing and holds the distinction of having the longest lasting juvenile mystery series written by a single author, unlike the series books written by numerous authors by the Stratemeyer Syndicate. A Shepherd Boy of Australia and The Boys of the Ohio Valley were illustrated with photographs.

== Books and series by Margaret Sutton ==
- Judy Bolton (38 volumes, 1932–1967)
- Gail Gardner (2 volumes, 1944-1945), inspired by letters from her niece, Rosaleen Ingalls, while she attended nursing school, and also by the author's experience as a Red Cross nurse's aide.
- A Shepherd Boy of Australia (1941)
- Two Boys of the Ohio Valley (1943)
- The Magic Makers (at least 3 volumes, 1936)
- Wer spielt mit mir? (Released in the US as Who will play with me?; Illust: Corinne Dillon (Wonder Book: 1951/1958)
- Lollypop: The True Story of a Little Dog (1939)
- Jemima, Daughter of Daniel Boone (1942)
- Two Boys of the Ohio Valley (1943)
- The Haunted Apartment (1946)
- Who Will Play with Me? (1951)
- Palace Wagon Family: A True Story of the Donner Party (1957)
- The Weed Walk (1965)
- Kay Darcy and the Mystery Hideout, under pseudonym Irene Ray (Whitman: 1937)
