= Roger Garis =

American writer (1901–1967)

- Born: September 10, 1901; Newark, New Jersey, USA
- Died: October 3, 1967 (aged 66); Amherst, Massachusetts, USA
- Education: Princeton University, Columbia University
- Occupation: Writer
- Spouse: Adine Haviland (m. 1937, divorced) Mabel Robinson Burns (m. 1941; death 1967)
- Children: 3
- Relatives: Howard R. Garis (father); Lilian Garis (mother)
- Writing career
- Genre: Children's literature
- Notable work: The Outboard Boys series

Roger Carroll Garis (1901– 1967) was an American writer. He wrote for magazines and also The Outboard Boys series of books. In addition to his writing of books for children and adults, he contributed to the Waterbury, Connecticut Republican and wrote for the stage and for television.

== Early life and education ==
Roger Carroll Garis was born in Newark, New Jersey on September 10, 1901, to Howard R. and Lilian Garis, both of whom were established writers.

Garis attended St. Benedict's Preparatory School, Princeton University, and Columbia University, ultimately earning a Bachelor of Laws from New Jersey Law School.

== Career ==
Garis briefly worked in law before beginning his writing career working for the Stratemeyer Syndicate. From 1930 to 1935, he wrote for the Evening News in Newark and occasionally wrote for Republican in Waterbury, Connecticut, as well as The New York Times Magazine.

Garis published his Outboard Boys series in the 1930s and later published Never Take Candy From A Stranger and My Father Was Uncle Wiggily (1966). He also wrote the play The Pony Cart, which ran in London and New York in the late 1950s.

After Garis moved from New York to Springfield, Massachusetts, he began publishing a weekly magazine, The Pioneer, in February 1949. Publication of the magazine was suspended in May 1949.

In January 1965 Garis began working at WHYN-TV in Springfield. As a member of the writing and producing staff, he was primarily responsible for writing the Bozo and Admiral and Swabby weekday daytime programs.

Garis' sister, Cleo F., also wrote a three-book series concurrently with his series.

== Personal life ==
Garis married Adine Haviland on October 23, 1937, in East Orange, New Jersey. She filed suit for divorce on June 30, 1938, and they later divorced. In 1941, he married Mabel Robinson Burns, with whom he had three children. The Garises' daughter, Leslie Garis, wrote a memoir about her family, House of Happy Endings, published by Farrar, Straus and Giroux in 2007.

Garis dealt with mental health issues throughout his life.

He died in Amherst, Massachusetts on October 3, 1967.

== Publications ==
=== Books ===
- The Outboard Boys At Mystery Island [f|1933]
- The Outboard Boys At Shadow Lake [f|1933]
- The Outboard Boys At Pirate Beach [f|1933]
- The Outboard Boys At Shark River [f|1934]
- Amusement Park (D. Appleton-Century, New York/London) [f|1934]
- Never Take Candy From A Stranger [f|1961]
- My Father Was Uncle Wiggily 1966

=== Movies ===
- Never Take Sweets from a Stranger (1960)
