= Are You in the House Alone? =

1978 television film by Walter Grauman

- Original CBS trade advertisement
- Genre: Thriller; horror
- Based on: Are You in the House Alone? by Richard Peck
- Written by: Judith Parker
- Directed by: Walter Grauman
- Starring: Kathleen Beller; Blythe Danner; Dennis Quaid
- Music by: Charles Bernstein
- Country of origin: United States
- Original language: English

Production
- Executive producers: Dick Berg; Charles Fries
- Producer: Jay Benson
- Production locations: Ahmanson Mansion - 401 South Hudson Place, Hancock Park, Los Angeles, California; Fisherman's Wharf, San Francisco, California
- Cinematography: Jack Swain
- Editor: Anthony DiMarco
- Running time: 96 minutes
- Production company: Charles Fries Productions

Original release
- Network: CBS
- Release: September 20, 1978

Are You in the House Alone? is a 1978 American made-for-television horror film directed by Walter Grauman and starring Kathleen Beller, Blythe Danner, and Dennis Quaid. The film is based on the 1976 novel of the same name written by Richard Peck. It originally aired on CBS on September 20, 1978.

== Plot ==
16-year-old Gail Osborne is a typical high school student with a passion for photography. Six months ago, she and her parents moved from San Francisco to a smaller town due to her father Neil's claim the city was too dangerous following a burglary. Gail, a high-spirited romantic, initially started dating classmate E.K. Miller, but he broke off their relationship because Gail was unwilling to sleep with him.

Now, Gail is dating Steve Pastorinis, despite her overprotective mother's objections. After a while, she receives an anonymous letter which says: "I am watching you.” Gail thinks the letter is creepy, but is convinced by her best friend Allison Bremer that it is a practical joke from some student. However, when another note is found saying, "I know where you are I'm watching you you tramp I'm coming after you,” and phone calls from a strange man laughing in a creepy way. Gail decides to warn her principal, who informs her it could be the act of her current or former boyfriend, someone she's rejected, or perhaps someone she knows that's hanging around.

One day, Gail tries to tell her mother Anne about the stalking, but Anne is too busy to pay attention and blows Gail off. Therefore, Gail ditches school and heads to San Francisco to visit her father at work. There, she finds out her father has been fired. Back home, she confronts her mother with this, who demands her to keep silent so Neil will not feel ashamed. Gail realizes more serious matters are going on in her life and decides to no longer pay attention to the notes and phone calls. One day when she's late for class, there is another message sticking out of her locker – a black and white picture of herself that she took in photography class with the word "RAPE" all in red across her face.

One night, she is babysitting the children of Jessica Hirsch, who is dating Gail's teacher Chris Elden. She receives a phone call from her boyfriend Steve Pastorinis, and he asks if he can come over after work and spend time together. Gail, relieved, says yes, and he tells her he'll be there soon. The phone rings again, and thinking it's Steve she answers, but it's the same stalker, laughing hysterically asking: Are you in the house alone? Afraid, Gail locks the door and windows all around the house.

Someone knocks on the front door. Excited to see Steve, Gail opens the door and sees it's Allison's boyfriend, Phil Lawver. Phil asks if Allison is around because she said she was going to come by, and Gail responds she isn't there. Phil then asks to use the phone to call Allison's house. Phil picks up the receiver and dials the number, but puts his finger on the receiving end to cancel the call and then pretends to be on the phone with Allison's mother while pulling out a handkerchief and wiping off the phone. Gail looks over and sees him wiping the phone and he looks back at her before dropping the phone on the ground.

He looks at her and says, "I really had you fooled, didn't I?" Gail lets out a sigh of relief figuring he was pulling a prank on her. Phil then says in a raspy creepy voice "Are you in the house alone?" Phil reveals that it wasn't a prank and that he's been stalking her and knows everything about her. He then attacks her, forces her onto the ground, and proceeds to rape her. Afterwards, he runs out of the house.

Due to the trauma, Gail is hospitalized and at first refuses to say that Phil raped her, knowing she won't be believed. Instead, she claims it was all a blur. Another female officer comes in to ask if she can try to remember, and Gail continues to lie out of fear. The female officer leaves, but tells her that if she changes her mind, to call her at the station. She also mentions that if Gail doesn't give her a name, they have no case, and her attacker can do this to someone else. Fearing that some other girl might endure what she just went through, she tells the officer it was Phillip Lawver. Her father is outraged at Phil, but finds out they can not sue him because Phil's father is a close friend of the local judge.

Gail is eventually encouraged by her teacher Malevich not to be afraid any longer and she returns to school. There, she finds out another girl is receiving the same creepy notes. Determined to stop Phil, she attempts to catch him on camera. Phil, however, is onto her and attempts to beat her up, but is caught by Steve. In the end, Phil pleads guilty to assault but is not charged with rape. He disappears, and one rumor has it that he is in a boarding school in New Hampshire.

== Cast ==
- Kathleen Beller as Gail Osborne
- Blythe Danner as Anne Osborne
- Tony Bill as Neil Osborne
- Robin Mattson as Allison Bremer
- Tricia O'Neil as Jessica Hirsch
- Dennis Quaid as Phil Lawver
- Alan Fudge as Chris Elden
- Scott Colomby as Steve Pastorinis
- Ellen Travolta as Rouillard
- Randy Stumpf as E.K. Miller
- Magda Harout as Malevich

Distribution by GoodTimes Entertainment and Worldvision Home Video and on DVD by Scream Factory (under license from MGM Studios) as a double feature with the 1978 horror film The Initiation of Sarah on December 10, 2013. Vinegar Syndrome released the film on blu-ray as part of their Televised Terror box

set.
