= Judy Bolton Series =

Young adult series by Margaret Sutton

- Cover of a Judy Bolton book, illustrated by Pelagie Doane
- Author: Margaret Sutton (primary); Kate Emburg; Linda Joy Singleton; Kate Duvall and Beverly Hatfield
- Language: English
- Published: 1932-1967, 1993-2018
- No. of books: 42

The Judy Bolton Mystery Series, written by Margaret Sutton, follows a realistic young woman who solves mysteries. Although the series was not quite as popular as Nancy Drew, Judy Bolton has been called a more complex and believable role model for girls. Judy was also unique in that halfway through the series, she married (something series book heroines rarely, if ever, did) The 38-volume series was written from 1932 to 1967 and is the longest-lasting juvenile mystery series written by an individual author.

== Characters ==
The mainstays of the series were Judy Bolton, auburn-haired girl detective; her brother, news reporter Horace Bolton; her parents, Dr. and Mrs. Bolton; and her loyal black cat, Blackberry. For most of the early volumes she was torn between suitors: the wealthy Arthur Farringdon-Pett, and the upstanding lawyer Peter Dobbs, before finally choosing Peter in volume 10. Her best friend was Peter's sister, Grace Dobbs, known as Honey; her rival for Arthur's affections was Lorraine Lee. Judy was friends with Arthur's sister, Lois Farringdon-Pett, and one of her high-school archenemies was snobbish Kay Vincent. Judy also befriended a mill worker, Irene Lang, who later became Irene Meredith.

== Critical assessment ==
Judy Bolton has been called a better feminist role model than Nancy Drew because "Nancy Drew is more likely to uphold the ideological status quo, while Judy Bolton is more likely to restore moral rather than legal order, because her mysteries tend to emphasize human relationships over material possessions." Unlike Drew, Bolton often enlists the aid of family members and friends in solving mysteries; she "works in a collaborative way that subverts dominant values."

Judy is emotional and self-doubting; for this reason she has been called a "more believable" female role model. As a part of her collaborative approach, Judy is often defined in relation to men: as Dr. Bolton's daughter or later, as Peter Dobbs's wife.

== Publication history ==
There were 38 titles in the original Judy Bolton series, copyrighted between 1932 and 1967. The final twelve had limited printings and as a result were hard to find until they were reissued. Collectors often found themselves paying upwards of $200 for a volume in good condition. The series ended before the 39th book, The Strange Likeness, could be published. According to author Margaret Sutton, the series was killed due not to poor sales, but to pressure from the Stratemeyer Syndicate. The Stratemeyer Syndicate wished to lessen competition for the Nancy Drew series. Pelagie Doane illustrated many of the early Judy Bolton books.

Starting in the 1990s the series was republished by Applewood Books.

A number of translations were published internationally, including Icelandic, Norwegian, Swedish, Danish and Spanish editions.

== Books by authors other than Sutton ==
In 1993, 27 years after Margaret Sutton's last Judy Bolton title, The Whispering Belltower was written by Kate Emburg with Sutton's encouragement. It takes place about eight years after the last Sutton book, and Judy and Peter have three children. It was published in pamphlet form, with a second edition in 1998. This was followed by a limited edition hardback by Amereon in 2006.

In 1997, Linda Joy Singleton completed a book that Sutton had begun several years before. Singleton submitted it to Sutton for revisions and the book carries the names of both authors. Chronologically, The Talking Snowman takes place during the Christmas season between the events described in volume 3 and volume 4, and is known to collectors as volume 3.5.

In 2012, Kate Duvall and Beverly Hatfield wrote The Strange Likeness. Sutton had created the title and the beginnings of a plot outline for a mystery located in Panama in 1968. Duvall and Hatfield never saw the outline, however, and the book is original to them. The book was edited by Sutton's youngest daughter, Lindsay Sutton Stroh, and illustrated by another daughter, Marjorie Sutton Eckstein. The book was published as #39.

In 2018, The Mystery on Judy Lane was published, also written by Hatfield, bringing the total books in the series to 42. Judy Lane takes place between books 13 and 14. In 2026, Hatfield announced that she is working a new book, to be called Secrets in the Woods.

== Titles ==
1. The Vanishing Shadow (1932)
2. The Haunted Attic (1932)
3. The Invisible Chimes (1932)
3.5. The Talking Snowman (1997) *
4. Seven Strange Clues (1932)
5. The Ghost Parade (1933)
6. The Yellow Phantom (1933)
7. The Mystic Ball (1934)
8. The Voice in the Suitcase (1935)
9. The Mysterious Half Cat (1936)
10. The Riddle of the Double Ring (1937)
11. The Unfinished House (1938)
12. The Midnight Visitor (1939)
13. The Name on the Bracelet (1940)
13.5 The Mystery on Judy Lane (2018) *
14. The Clue in the Patchwork Quilt (1941)
15. The Mark on the Mirror (1942)
16. The Secret of the Barred Window (1943)
17. The Rainbow Riddle (1946)
18. The Living Portrait (1947)
19. The Secret of the Musical Tree (1948)

20. The Warning on the Window (1949)
21. The Clue of the Stone Lantern (1950)
22. The Spirit of Fog Island (1951)
23. The Black Cat's Clue (1952)
24. The Forbidden Chest (1953)
25. The Haunted Road (1954)
26. The Clue in the Ruined Castle (1955)
27. The Trail of the Green Doll (1956)
28. The Haunted Fountain (1957)
29. The Clue of the Broken Wing (1958)
30. The Phantom Friend (1959)
31. The Discovery at the Dragon's Mouth (1960)
32. The Whispered Watchword (1961)
33. The Secret Quest (1962)
34. The Puzzle in the Pond (1963)
35. The Hidden Clue (1964)
36. The Pledge of the Twin Knights (1965)
37. The Search for the Glowing Hand (1966)
38. The Secret at the Sand Castle (1967)
39. The Strange Likeness (2012) *
40. The Whispering Belltower (1993) *

* Written by an author other than Sutton; not part of original series.
