= No Place to Hide (1981 film) =

- VHS release cover
- Genre: Drama; Horror; Mystery; Thriller
- Based on: story by Harriet Steinberg
- Screenplay by: Jimmy Sangster
- Directed by: John Llewellyn Moxey
- Starring: Mariette Hartley; Kathleen Beller
- Theme music composer: John Cacavas
- Country of origin: United States
- Original language: English

Production
- Executive producer: Robert D. Wood
- Producers: Jay Daniel; S. Bryan Hickox
- Cinematography: Robert B. Hauser
- Editor: Dennis C. Duckwall
- Running time: 100 minutes
- Production company: Metromedia Producers Corporation

Original release
- Network: CBS
- Release: March 4, 1981

No Place to Hide is a 1981 American made-for-TV psychological thriller directed by John Llewellyn Moxey. The film is based on an unpublished story by Harriet Steinberg, and stars Mariette Hartley, Kathleen Beller and Keir Dullea.

== Plot ==
After leaving work one evening, a 20-year-old art student named Amy Manning (Kathleen Beller) finds out while driving home that the mysterious man in black who sneaks up on her repeatedly is in her backseat. Even though he has the opportunity to kill her, he tells her "Soon, Amy, soon" and then leaves. The police are no longer willing to help her, and although her stepmother Adele (Mariette Hartley) tells her she believes her, she advises her to visit a psychiatrist, Dr. Letterman (Keir Dullea). To him she admits that her father drowned a year ago during a boating accident. She was supposed to attend him on his trip, but canceled, and has felt guilty ever since.

One day, she finds a package in the post with a card that reads "Soon, Amy, soon". With Adele, she traces the origin of the package, leading to a florist (Milton Selzer) who claims that she made the order herself. Adele contacts James Lockwood, attorney and best friend of Amy's father (Arlen Dean Snyder) to discuss Amy's situation, but she overhears this and runs off to college in anger. There, the mysterious man shows up again and terrifies her, as she tries to escape, until lawyer student David Norland (Gary Graham) appears. Returning to psychiatrist Letterman, Amy is told that her subconscious is making up the killer. She believes him, and decides to return to the place where her father died - a cabin in the woods - to face her guilt.

Originally, Adele accompanies her, but a sudden meeting with James forces her to leave. During this meeting, James tells her that he heard from Letterman that Amy is suicidal. Considering that she will receive her father's estate when she turns 21 in three months, it would leave them penniless. Adele puts up an act as though she only cares about Amy's well-being, but it later turns out that she set everything up to drive Amy insane, with Letterman posing as the mysterious man. Letterman, meanwhile, has gone to the cabin, and after a struggle, he sedates Amy and puts her on a boat, pushing her into the river. Afterwards, he comforts Adele, who feels somewhat guilty due to her recent bonding with Amy.

Shortly later, strange events start to occur to Adele in the mansion, such as locked doors that suddenly open, and a sculpture of Amy that disappears. She becomes convinced that someone is messing with her, but Letterman convinces her that she is imagining it all. One night, she is determined that she is hearing Amy's cries, until she receives a phone call from James, informing her that Amy's body has been found. The following night, Adele is startled when Amy suddenly appears before her door. Around the same time, Letterman arrives, and Adele, thinking his attempts to enter her room are Amy's, shoots through the door, killing him.

It turns out that Amy's death was a set-up from James, David and Amy to eventually scare her into the confession of killing Amy's father. Shortly after Adele's arrest, Amy is happy to celebrate her two months with David. In the final scene, David whispers "Soon, Amy, soon".

== Cast ==
- Mariette Hartley as Adele Manning
- Kathleen Beller as Amy Manning
- Arlen Dean Snyder as James Stockwood
- Gary Graham as David Norland
- Keir Dullea as Cliff Letterman
- Sandy McPeak as Sergeant Newman
- Milton Selzer as Florist
- Brad M. Bucklin as Driver

== Production ==
No Place to Hide was the first film in which Kathleen Beller did not portray a teenager: "It's wonderful not to push younger. Or put my hair up in pigtails and go around saying 'Hi!' I was surprised when they approached me. I've had so much trouble convincing people of age that it's a compliment." Beller admitted that when she met director John Llewellyn Moxey, she "was intimidated by him" and that he "almost talked me out of the role": "I told him I didn't want to play the same little girl again. He said I didn't have to play it that way. We got into a philosophical discussion and when I left I thought I wouldn't do the role"."

According to Beller, filming went smoothly, and the cast showed up every day an hour early to rehearse. She recalled working with Mariette Hartley as "wonderful", because "she lightened up the whole set". Hartley especially liked working with Keir Dullea and said in an interview with Playboy:

"I was doing a necking scene with Keir for the TV movie No Place to Hide. We necked the whole day. I was so turned on by the end of the afternoon that I rushed home to my poor husband. [..] Then, the next week, the same thing happened. Keir and I necked all day, and by the time I was off the free-way, whammo! When filming ended, Patrick - thank God he's as secure as he is - turned to me and said, 'You know, I'm really going to miss Keir.'"
