= Grace Harlowe =

Fictional heroine of book series published 1910–24

Grace Harlowe is the protagonist and eponym of four series of books for girls, published by Altemus between 1910 and 1924. At least some volumes were reprinted by Saalfield Publishing. The High School Girls Series, College Girls Series, Grace Harlowe Overseas Series, and Grace Harlowe Overland Riders Series were written by Josephine Chase, under the pseudonym Jessie Graham Flower.

== Titles in the series ==
=== The High School Girls Series ===
- Grace Harlowe's Plebe Year at High School; The Merry Doings of the Oakdale Freshmen Girls (1910)
- Grace Harlowe's Sophomore Year at High School; or, The Record of the Girl Chums in Work and Athletics (1911)
- Grace Harlowe's Junior Year at High School; or, Fast Friends in the Sororities (1911)
- Grace Harlowe's Senior Year at High School; or, The Parting of the Ways (1911)

=== The College Girls Series ===
- Grace Harlowe's First Year at Overton College (1914)
- Grace Harlowe's Second Year at Overton College (1914)
- Grace Harlowe's Third Year at Overton College (1914)
- Grace Harlowe's Fourth Year at Overton College (1914)
- Grace Harlowe's Return to Overton Campus (1915)
- Grace Harlowe's Problem (1916)
- Grace Harlowe's Golden Summer (1917)

=== Grace Harlowe Overseas Series ===
- Grace Harlowe Overseas (1920)
- Grace Harlowe with the Red Cross in France (1920)
- Grace Harlowe with the Marines at Chateau Thierry (1920)
- Grace Harlowe with the U.S. Troops in the Argonne (1920)
- Grace Harlowe with the Yankee Shock Boys at St. Quentin (1920)
- Grace Harlowe with the American Army on the Rhine (1920)

=== Grace Harlowe Overland Riders Series ===
- Grace Harlowe's Overland Riders on the Old Apache Trail (1921)
- Grace Harlowe's Overland Riders on the Great American Desert (1921)
- Grace Harlowe's Overland Riders Among the Kentucky Mountaineers (1921)
- Grace Harlowe's Overland Riders in the Great North Woods (1921)
- Grace Harlowe's Overland Riders in the High Sierras (1923)
- Grace Harlowe's Overland Riders in the Yellowstone National Park (1923)
- Grace Harlowe's Overland Riders in the Black Hills (1923)
- Grace Harlowe's Overland Riders at Circle O Ranch (1923)
- Grace Harlowe's Overland Riders Among the Border Guerillas (1924)
- Grace Harlowe's Overland Riders On the Lost River Trail (1924)
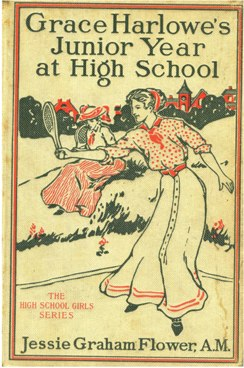
High School Girls Series

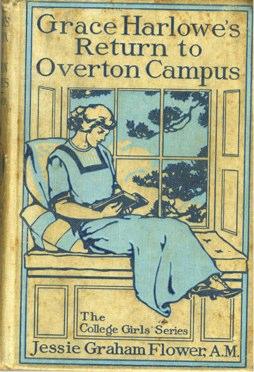
College Girls Series

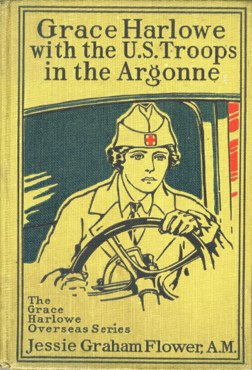
Grace Harlowe Overseas Series

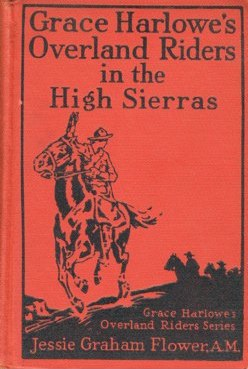
Grace Harlowe Overland Riders Series

== Plot overview ==
The four series follow Grace Harlowe and her friends through high school, college, abroad during World War I, and on adventures around America. In The High School Girls Series, Grace attends Oakdale High School with friends Anne Pierson, Nora O'Malley, and Jessica Bright. The four promote fair play and virtue while winning over troubled girls like Miriam Nesbit and Eleanor Savell, playing basketball, and founding sorority Phi Sigma Tau. The group becomes friends with boys in their acquaintance: David Nesbit, Tom Gray, Hippy Wingate, and Reddy Brooks, forming "The Eight Originals."

The College Girls Series sees the friends part ways: Grace, Anne, and Miriam depart for Overton College, while Jessica and Nora attend a conservatory. The Eight Originals gather on holidays, but the seven College books focus on the three at Overton, along with new friends like J. Elfreda Briggs. They form Semper Fidelis, a society devoted to aiding less fortunate students at Overton. Following graduation, Grace rebuffs offers of marriage for "what she had firmly believed to be her destined work," managing Harlowe House at Overton. By the end of the series, she and most of her friends have married within their circle.

Grace Harlowe Overseas Series follows Grace and many of her friends to Europe to serve in World War I. A number of the college friends join a Red Cross unit known as the Overton Unit, but as the war progresses, they grow more scattered. At one point, the remaining principal characters consist of Grace and J. Elfreda, while the rest fall to the periphery. Grace and her husband return with a daughter, Yvonne, whom they adopted in France.

Grace Harlowe Overland Riders Series follows Grace and some of her friends through adventures on horseback around North America, upon their return from Europe.

== Other characters ==
Anne Pierson: She becomes Grace's best friends in Grace Harlowe's Plebe Year at High School. She remains a prominent character right up to Grace Harlowe's Golden Summer. Anne is gentle, quiet, studious and brilliant at elocution and drama. Although from a poor family, she earns her way through college by acting with a reputed theatre company. Her gentle ways and practical experience of poverty help her friends befriend less fortunate girls like Mabel Allison (in the High School series) and Ruth Denton (in the College series).

Nora O'Malley: She has been friends with Grace for a longer time than Anne. She is Irish-Catholic, good at singing and basketball, with a hot temper but kind heart. After the High School series, she goes to study in a Conservatory of Music, but returns to a more prominent role in the Overseas and Overland Riders books.

Jessica Bright: Another old friend of Grace's from her pre-high school days, Jessica is a quiet, gentle girl, good at playing the piano. Unlike the other 4 high school chums, she is motherless and has no brothers or sisters. She is often lonely at home and this leads her to adopt Mabel Allison as her foster-sister in Grace Harlowe's Junior Year at High School.

Tom Gray: He first meets the circle of friends in Grace Harlowe's Plebe Year at High School. He is the nephew of Rose Gray, the 'fairy-godmother' of the freshman class of Oakdale High School for Girls. He is an expert woodsman and ultimately takes up a post in the Department of Forestry. He marries Grace after nearly two years of unsuccessful courtship.

David Nesbit: Brother of Miriam Nesbit, he is a special friend of Anne Pierson and ultimately marries her in Grace Harlowe's Problem. He has an aptitude for mechanics and designs model airplanes in the first two books of the High School series.

== Analysis ==
At the time of their publication, the Grace Harlowe series was advertised as "stories of real girls for real girls." The Grace Harlowe Overseas Series, in particular, was written to translate world events to a generation of young girls. Sold as "War Books for Girls," one preview read, "Many war books fail to interest girl readers because they do not describe the Great War from a girl's point of view. But it is quite certain that every healthy girl reader will be enthused with the description of the Great War . . . These books give intimate descriptions of conditions found in France by the many young American girls and women who were there to serve their country by aiding the American fighting forces."

In addition to providing a lens through which girls could view a rapidly changing world, the Grace Harlowe books model the ideal American girl (as envisioned by her publishers). This ideal plays out across a variety of settings, but the characteristics that define her remain constant. "The democratic foundations of both public and private education in these series are directly connected to the formation of each character's personal integrity and to her status as a representative of socially and morally acceptable American girlhood. In the plot-driven series, heroines such as Marjorie Dean and Grace Harlowe are already nearly paragons when their stories begin . . . but in all cases, the series strongly suggest that if readers are to assume similar places as model girls, they should begin by reforming the self so as to measure up to the stories' idealized definitions of proper gender roles and proper middle-class attitudes . . . The best girls are loyal to principles, to friends and family, and to the school itself. They also are (or learn to be) nurturing, charitable, and kind."

While certain values were expected of a model girl, Grace Harlowe shows that girls could live up to those while experiencing freedoms like travel, independence, and employment (within certain bounds). As one writer puts it, "Grace tries on all the socially acceptable roles for a New Woman of her class, skipping the more controversial roles of radical suffragette, sexy flapper, and independent career woman.

Other writers viewed Grace's adventures as far less realistic to the average girl. "Many of these popular insurgent novels, especially those that focused on characters whose freedom from convention is never confronted, were obviously utopian in nature. The protagonists in The Outdoor Girls of Deepdale or The Grace Harlowe at Overton College series were rewarded for behavior that would have brought censure upon the heads of actual readers if they were to initiate such activity in their own communities." Another argues, "Grace also has the support of her parents as she embarks on a career, a fact that may have surprised her original readers, since most parents - real or fictional - expected their daughters to marry after college."

Whether Grace's life might have been lived out by a real girl is debatable, but certainly, her story is one that was not told just a few decades prior.

== Collecting ==
Grace Harlowe books can be found for sale online and occasionally at used book stores and sales. Since they were in print for fewer years than series like Nancy Drew or The Bobbsey Twins, they can be more challenging to find (although scarcity and value, as with any series, depend largely on condition, edition, and specific title). Given their limited publication dates, books in the Grace Harlowe Overseas Series seem to be among the most difficult to find in any condition, and often bring the highest prices.

== Contemporary series ==
Altemus published series books with pages of advertising for other series. Some that can be found in Grace Harlowe books include: The Automobile Girls, Madge Morton, The Meadow-Brook Girls, and boys' series like: Dave Darrin, Submarine Boys, and The High School Boys. Altemus even occasionally cross-referenced series, as when Madge Morton makes a cameo appearance in Grace Harlowe's Problem.

Other contemporary series published for school girls include: Betty Gordon, Marjorie Dean, The Outdoor Girls, The Moving Picture Girls, Jane Allen, Betty Wales, Ruth Fielding, The Girls of Central High, Friendly Terrace, Fairmount Girls, Helen Grant, Hadley Hall, Nancy Lee, Isabel Carleton, Molly Brown.
