= Golden hour =

Golden hour most commonly refers to:

- Golden hour (medicine), the first sixty minutes after major traumatic injury
- Golden hour (photography), the first hour after dawn and the last hour before dusk
- Golden hour, the first hour of post-natal life, important to breastfeeding

Golden hour(s) or Golden Hour(s) may also refer to:

== Music ==
=== Albums ===
- Golden Hour (Sevish album), 2010
- The Golden Hour (album), 2008
- Golden Hour (Kacey Musgraves album), 2018
- Golden Hour (Kygo album), 2020

=== Songs ===
- "Golden Hour" (song), a 2022 song by Jvke
- "Golden Hour", a 2022 song by Hrvy
- "Golden Hour", a 2023 song by Mark Lee
- "Golden Hour", a song by Rick Astley from his 2023 album Are We There Yet?
- "Golden Hours", a song by Brian Eno from his 1975 album Another Green World

== Other ==
- Golden Hours (magazine), an American juvenile magazine
- Golden Hour, an episode of Ninjago: Reimagined
- A term for prime time in several countries

== See also ==
- The Golden Hour (disambiguation)
