= The Golden Hour =

The Golden Hour may refer to:

== In literature ==
- The Golden Hour (Beatriz Williams novel), a 2019 historical fiction novel by Beatriz Williams
- The Golden Hour (Maiya Williams novel), a children's novel by Maiya Williams
- The Golden Hour (Smith novel), graphic children's novel by Niki Smith

== In media ==
- The Golden Hour (radio feature), a feature on BBC Radio 1
- The Golden Hour (TV series), a 2005 ITV drama series
- Larry Gogan's Golden Hour, a programme on Ireland's RTÉ 2fm, known also as The Golden Hour

== In music ==
- The Golden Hour (album), by indie rock band Firewater
- The Golden Hour: Under the Orange Sun, a 2022 concert headline by South Korean singer IU

== See also ==
- Golden hour (disambiguation)
