= The Wicked City (novel series) =

Historical fiction series by Beatriz Williams

- The Wicked City (2017); The Wicked Redhead (2019); The Wicked Widow (2021)
- Author: Beatriz Williams
- Genre: Historical fiction
- Publisher: William Morrow and Company
- Published: January 17, 2017 – October 12, 2021
- No. of books: 3

The Wicked City is a historical fiction series by Beatriz Williams consisting of three books: The Wicked City (2017), The Wicked Redhead (2019), and The Wicked Widow (2021).

== The Wicked City (2017) ==
The Wicked City was published January 17, 2017 by William Morrow and Company.

The Wicked City was generally well received by critics.

Library Journal's Stacey Hayman said The Wicked City is "a smart suggestion for fans of strong female characters, historical fiction, and family sagas."

Katie Noah Gibson, writing for Shelf Awareness, praised Williams's strengths as a historical fiction writing, highlighting how she "evokes the glitter and scandal of Jazz Age New York." Gibson concluded the review by writing, "Williams ratchets up the action on each successive page, leaving readers no choice but to race after Gin as she pursues love, revenge and the perfect stiff drink."

Kirkus Reviews, however, provided a more critical review, noting that "the parallels between the two heroines are underdeveloped, and Ginger’s story is stalled by excessive verbiage designed, apparently, to showcase the author’s fluency in Runyon-speak." They concluded by saying, "Even for a series launch, too much is left dangling."

Booklist also reviewed the novel.

== The Wicked Redhead (2019) ==
The Wicked Redhead was published December 10, 2019 by William Morrow and Company.

The Wicked Redhead was generally well received by critics.

Katie Noah Gibson, writing for Shelf Awareness, wrote that Ginger's "fast-paced, fast-talking adventures will leave readers astounded at her courage and thirsty for the next deliciously wicked romp in this series."

Kirkus Reviews provided a less positive review, calling The Wicked Redhead "a seemingly superfluous sequel." They praised Williams's historical accuracy, mentioning, among other historical notes, that "Ginger’s first-person voice, that of a feisty hillbilly–turned–Manhattan flapper, is authentic enough." However, they claim Ginger's voice feels "a bit stilted, as if too much research had gone into imagining her argot." Similarly, "Ginger’s mental observations," which help to situate the story in a precise time and place, "are recounted with a degree of detail that, while fulfilling its intended effect of re-creating the period and social milieu, does little to advance the story."

Booklist and Library Journal also reviewed the novel.

== The Wicked Widow (2021) ==
The Wicked Widow was published October 12, 2021 by William Morrow and Company.

Booklist's Emily Borsa said "Series fans will enjoy" the third installment of The Wicked City series.
