= Marjorie Dean =

Fictional character and book series by Josephine Chase

Marjorie Dean is the protagonist and eponymous character of series of books for girls, written by Josephine Chase under the pen name Pauline Lester. The fourteen books were published by A. L. Burt between 1917 and 1930. Chase wrote a number of series, including the Grace Harlowe series under the pseudonym Jessie Graham Flower.

== Titles in the series ==
=== Marjorie Dean High School Series ===
- Marjorie Dean, High School Freshman (1917)
- Marjorie Dean, High School Sophomore (1917)
- Marjorie Dean, High School Junior (1917)
- Marjorie Dean, High School Senior (1917)

=== Marjorie Dean College Series ===
- Marjorie Dean, College Freshman (1922)
- Marjorie Dean, College Sophomore (1922)
- Marjorie Dean, College Junior (1922)
- Marjorie Dean, College Senior (1922)

=== Marjorie Dean Post-Graduate Series ===
- Marjorie Dean, Post-Graduate (1925)
- Marjorie Dean, Marvelous Manager (1925)
- Marjorie Dean at Hamilton Arms (1925)
- Marjorie Dean's Romance (1925)
- Marjorie Dean Macy (1926)
- Marjorie Dean Macy's Hamilton Colony (1930)

== Plot Overview ==
The series opens with Marjorie's family moving from Franklin to Sanford at the beginning of her freshman year of high school. As a result, she is separated from her best friend, Mary, and enrolls at Sanford High School after the school year has already begun. Throughout her four years in Sanford, Marjorie makes loyal friends, including Constance Stevens, Geraldine Macy, Irma Linton, Susan Atwell, and Muriel Harding. She also spends the series battling snobbish, unfair students and teachers, most of whom are either jealous of Marjorie's beauty and skill at basketball, resentful of her democratic tendency to befriend disadvantaged girls, or need to overcome unjust assumptions. Her constant enemy throughout high school is Mignon LaSalle, who occasionally joins forces with an equally spiteful newcomer against Marjorie. Marjorie and her friends are frequently escorted to social events by local boys Hal Macy, Laurie Armitage, Danny Seabrooke, and "The Crane." Marjorie has a closer relationship with her parents, whom she calls "General" and "Captain," while they refer to her as "Lieutenant."

In the next four books, Marjorie attends Hamilton College with Jerry, Muriel, and Veronica Lynne, while Constance and other friends from Sanford study elsewhere. At Hamilton, Marjorie makes friends more easily than in high school, while battling the snobbery of a sorority called the Sans Soucians, led by Leslie Cairns. Marjorie succeeds in the end, and the Sans are eventually expelled for a number of offenses, including hazing.

After graduation, most of Marjorie's friends, now almost entirely included in a group called The Travelers, remain at Hamilton. Leslie continues to plot against them, meeting with no more success than she did as a student. Marjorie's main achievement is her friendship with Susanna Hamilton, the niece of Hamilton College's founder, Brooke Hamilton. Miss Susanna has a long-standing feud with the college board, which prevents her from commissioning her long-wished-for biography of her uncle. Marjorie wins her over, repairs her relationship with the college, and writes Brooke's biography. The Travelers also lead the construction of a new dormitory for students who cannot afford the campus houses. The series ends with Leslie's reform and most of the characters, including Marjorie, getting married.

== Analysis ==
As in Grace Harlowe and other girls' series of the time, Marjorie Dean upholds egalitarian principles, often at the expense of her immediate social acceptance. One historian notes, "In Marjorie, the author has constructed a character meant to represent the ideal product of an education based on the principles of democratic equality and social mobility." However, she continues, Chase's writing "suggests that Marjorie is being extremely broad-minded and even unusual in her willingness to admire" a girl of lower social standing than herself. Marjorie's adherence to such principles remains throughout the series, and her foes achieve success only by choosing to adopt them as well.

In addition to promoting progressive ideals, the Marjorie Dean books continue a common theme of ideal girlhood and maturity to womanhood. As another writer observes, "Dainty Marjorie and tomboy Grace are exemplars and mother-figures, straightening out those who are heading in the wrong direction, solving problems for those in trouble, and consciously upholding a kind of semi-religious image of the college itself. And the message is clear: good triumphs, good women lead the way."

Whether because or in spite of these instructive themes, both series were "enormously popular."

== Contemporary Series ==
As in many other series books of the time, Marjorie Dean books often featured post-text advertisements. Some include: The Girl Comrade's Series, The Girl Chum's Series, The Camp Fire Girls Series, The Blue Grass Seminary Girls Series, and the Mildred Series.

Other contemporary series published for school girls include: Betty Gordon, Grace Harlowe, The Outdoor Girls, The Moving Picture Girls, Jane Allen, Betty Wales, Ruth Fielding, The Girls of Central High, Friendly Terrace, Fairmount Girls, Helen Grant, Hadley Hall, Nancy Lee, Isabel Carleton, Molly Brown.
