= Lauren Willig =

American novelist

- Occupation: Writer
- Writing career
- Period: 2005–present
- Genres: Historical, Romance
- Website: www.laurenwillig.com

Lauren Willig is an American writer, specializing in historical novels. She is best known for her "Pink Carnation" series, which follows a collection of Napoleonic-Era British spies, similar to the Scarlet Pimpernel, as they fight for Britain and fall in love.

== Biography ==
A native of New York City, Willig discovered historical fiction when she was six years old. She had become fascinated by Eleanor of Aquitaine.

After graduating from the private Chapin School, Willig attended Yale University. There she majored in Renaissance Studies and Political Science, and was Chairman of the Tory Party of the Yale Political Union. She studied graduate-level early modern European history at Harvard University. She studied at and graduated from Harvard Law School.

Willig briefly worked for Cravath, Swaine & Moore, a law firm in New York. During this period, she also was writing her "Pink Carnation" series of books. She gave up law practice in order to focus full-time on the series.

Willig's books have been named a Romantic Times Top Pick. She was nominated in 2006 for a Quill Award. In addition by October 2011, she had won the RITA Award for Best Regency Historical Romance, the RT Reviewers Choice Award for Historical Fiction, the Booksellers Best Award for Long Historical Romance, and the Golden Leaf Award.

In Spring of 2010, Willig taught Reading the Historical Romance at her alma mater, Yale University, along with fellow alumna and romance novelist Andrea DaRif, (penname: Cara Elliott). The course received attention for helping to bring academic notice to the popular genre of romance novels.

Following her series, Willig has written eight stand-alone historical novels. She also co-authored five novels with fellow historical fiction authors Karen White and Beatriz Williams.

== Works ==
=== The Pink Carnation series ===
1. The Secret History of the Pink Carnation (February 2005) ISBN 978-0-525-94860-5
2. The Masque of the Black Tulip (December 29, 2005) ISBN 978-0-525-94920-6
3. The Deception of the Emerald Ring (November 16, 2006) ISBN 978-0-525-94977-0
4. The Seduction of the Crimson Rose (January 31, 2008) ISBN 978-0-525-95033-2
5. The Temptation of the Night Jasmine (January 22, 2009) ISBN 978-0-525-95096-7
6. The Betrayal of the Blood Lily (January 12, 2010) ISBN 978-0-525-95150-6
7. The Mischief of the Mistletoe (October 28, 2010) ISBN 978-0-525-95187-2
8. The Orchid Affair (January 20, 2011) ISBN 978-0-525-95199-5
9. The Garden Intrigue (February 16, 2012) ISBN 978-0-525-95254-1
10. The Passion of the Purple Plumeria (August 6, 2013) ISBN 978-0-451-41472-4
11. The Mark of the Midnight Manzanilla (August 5, 2014) ISBN 978-0-451-41473-1
12. The Lure of the Moonflower (August 4, 2015) ISBN 978-0-451-47302-8

=== Historical fiction ===
- The Ashford Affair (April 9, 2013) ISBN 978-1-250-01449-8
- That Summer (June 3, 2014) ISBN 978-1-250-01450-4
- The Other Daughter (July 21, 2015) ISBN 978-1-250-05628-3
- The Forgotten Room (with Karen White and Beatriz Williams) (January 19, 2016) ISBN 978-0-451-47462-9
- The English Wife (January 9, 2018) ISBN 978-1-250-05627-6
- The Glass Ocean (with Karen White and Beatriz Williams) (September 4, 2018) ISBN 978-0-062-85948-8
- The Summer Country (June 4, 2019) ISBN 978-0-062-83902-2
- All the Ways We Said Goodbye (with Karen White and Beatriz Williams) (January 14, 2020) ISBN 978-0062931092
- Band of Sisters (March 2, 2021) ISBN 978-0-062-98615-3
- The Lost Summers of Newport (with Karen White and Beatriz Williams) (May 17, 2022) ISBN 978-0-063-04074-8
- Two Wars and a Wedding (March 21, 2023) ISBN 978-0062986184
- The Author's Guide to Murder (with Karen White and Beatriz Williams) (November 5, 2024) ISBN 978-0063259867
- The Girl from Greenwich Street (March 4, 2025) ISBN 978-0063306110

=== Other works ===
- Two L (August 28, 2011) ISBN 978-1-4662-1298-5
- "A Night at Northanger" in Jane Austen Made Me Do It (October 2011) ISBN 978-0-345-52496-6
- "The Record Set Right" in A Fall of Poppies (March 22, 2016) ISBN 978-0-062-41854-8
- "Until We Meet Again" in A Paris All Your Own: Bestselling Women Writers on the City of Light (July 4, 2017) ISBN 978-0-399-57447-4
