= Vamoose =

Vamoose may refer to:

- Vamoose Bus, a regional bus line in the northeastern United States
- Vamoose (yacht), a steam-powered ship built in 1890 for William Randolph Hearst
