= Karen White =

American writer

- Born: Tulsa, Oklahoma, U.S.
- Genre: Romance, women's fiction
- Spouse: Timothy J. White

Website
- karen-white.com

Karen White is a New York Times bestselling American author of more than twenty-five novels.

== Life and career ==
White was born in Tulsa, Oklahoma, and during her childhood lived in numerous states and also in Venezuela and London, England, where she graduated from The American School in London. She attended college at Tulane University in New Orleans, Louisiana, where she obtained a Bachelor of Science in management.

Most of White's novels are based in the low-country of the southeastern United States. Her first book, In the Shadow of the Moon was a double finalist for the Romance Writers of America RITA Award. The Girl on Legare Street reached The New York Times Best Seller list in November 2009. On Folly Beach, published in May 2010, was also a NYT bestseller. White has published 27 novels to date, with the latest book, The Attic on Queen Street, released in November 2021. In addition to her solo work, White has also co-authored five novels with Beatriz Williams and Lauren Willig; the most recent, The Author's Guide to Murder was released in November 2024.

White is married to Timothy J. White, a US banker, with two children, and resides near Atlanta, Georgia. White is currently published by Berkley, a division of Penguin Random House.

== Bibliography ==
=== Stand alone novels ===
- In the Shadow of the Moon August 2000 ISBN 0-505-52395-7
- Whispers of Goodbye October 2001 ISBN 0-505-52455-4
- Falling Home June 2002 ISBN 0-8217-7338-0
- After the Rain April 2003 ISBN 0-8217-7339-9
- Blessings of Mossy Creek June 2004 ISBN 0-9673035-5-9
- The Color of Light June 2005 ISBN 0-451-21511-7
- Pieces of the Heart April 2006 ISBN 0-451-21767-5
- Learning to Breathe March 2007 ISBN 978-0-451-22034-9
- The Memory of Water March 2008 ISBN 0-451-22303-9
- The Lost Hours April 2009 ISBN 0-451-22649-6
- On Folly Beach May 2010 ISBN 0-451-22921-5
- The Beach Trees May 2011 ISBN 0-451-23307-7
- Sea Change June 2012 ISBN 0-451-23676-9
- The Time Between June 2013 ISBN 0-451-23986-5
- A Long Time Gone June 2014 ISBN 0-451-24046-4
- The Sound of Glass May 2015 ISBN 0-451-47089-3
- Flight Patterns May 2016 ISBN 0-451-47523-2
- The Night the Lights Went Out April 2017 ISBN 978-0451488381
- Dreams of Falling June 2018 ISBN 978-0451488411

=== Tradd Street series ===
- The House on Tradd Street November 2008 ISBN 0-451-22509-0
- The Girl On Legare Street November 2009 ISBN 0-451-22799-9
- The Strangers on Montagu Street November 2011 ISBN 0-451-23526-6
- Return to Tradd Street January 2014 ISBN 0-451-24059-6
- The Guests on a South Battery January 2017 ISBN 978-0451475237
- The Christmas Spirits on Tradd Street October 2019 ISBN 978-0-451-47524-4
- The Attic on Queen Street November 2021 ISBN 978-0451475251

=== Collaborative novels ===
- The Forgotten Room (with Lauren Willig and Beatriz Williams) January 2016 ISBN 978-0-451-47462-9
- The Glass Ocean (with Lauren Willig and Beatriz Williams) September 2018 ISBN 978-0-062-85948-8
- All the Ways We Said Goodbye (with Lauren Willig and Beatriz Williams) January 2020 ISBN 978-0-062-93109-2
- The Lost Summers of Newport (with Lauren Willig and Beatriz Williams) May 2022 ISBN 978-0-063-04074-8
- The Author's Guide to Murder (with Lauren Willig and Beatriz Williams) November 2024 ISBN 978-0063259867
