= Schuyler sisters =

The Schuyler sisters can refer to:

- historical Schuyler sisters of the prominent American Schuyler family:
  - Angelica Schuyler Church (1756–1814), American socialite
  - Elizabeth Schuyler Hamilton (1757–1854), American socialite and philanthropist, wife of Alexander Hamilton
  - Peggy Schuyler (1758–1801), American socialite
- "The Schuyler Sisters", a song from the musical Hamilton
- Schuyler Sisters (novel series), a series of books by Beatriz Williams
