= Jessie Graham Flower =

American writer (~1878-??)

Jessie Graham Flower is a pseudonym for American author Josephine Chase. Born about 1878 in Pennsylvania to Edward H. Chase and Mary Arrner Chase. Chase was the author of the popular Grace Harlowe series of 27 books for girls, written between 1910 and 1924. The books fall into four separate series, including a high school series, college series, Overseas series, and Overland Riders series. Chase never married. She died February 8, 1931, in Philadelphia.

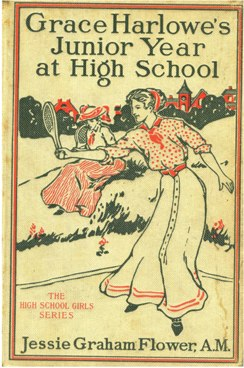
An early cover design for Grace Harlowe's Junior Year at High School

The author was also known by other pseudonyms including Pauline Lester (The Marjorie Dean series), Ames Thompson (The Adventure Boys series), Captain Gordon Bates (The Khaki Boys series, 1918–1920), Grace Gordon (The June Allen series), and Dale Wilkins. The Harlowe series follows the life of its heroine more or less chronologically from high school through college and beyond. Like Flower's other heroine, Grace is a role-model, already a "paragon when her story begins".

== Books in the Grace Harlowe series ==
Books in the Grace Harlowe series include at least the following books, all of which are available through Project Gutenberg:

- Grace Harlowe's Plebe Year at High School; The Merry Doings of the Oakdale Freshmen Girls (1910)
- Grace Harlowe's Sophomore Year at High School; The Record of the Girl Chums in Work and Athletics (1911)
- Grace Harlowe's Junior Year at High School; Fast Friends in the Sororities (1911)
- Grace Harlowe's Senior Year at High School; The Parting of the Ways(1911)
- Grace Harlowe's First Year at Overton College (1914)
- Grace Harlowe's Second Year at Overton College (1914)
- Grace Harlowe's Third Year at Overton College (1914)
- Grace Harlowe's Fourth Year at Overton College (1914)
- Grace Harlowe's Return to Overton Campus (1915)
- Grace Harlowe's Problem (1916)
- Grace Harlowe's Golden Summer (1917)
- Grace Harlowe with the American Army on the Rhine (1920)
- Grace Harlowe's Overland Riders on the Old Apache Trail (1921)
- Grace Harlowe's Overland Riders on the Great American Desert (1921)
- Grace Harlowe's Overland Riders in the Great North Woods (1921)
- Grace Harlowe's Overland Riders Among the Kentucky Mountaineers (1922)
- Grace Harlowe's Overland Riders in the High Sierras (1923)
- Grace Harlowe's Overland Riders In The Yellowstone National Park (1923)
- Grace Harlowe's Overland Riders at Circle O Ranch (1923)
- Grace Harlowe's Overland Riders on the Lost River Trail (1924)

The following Grace Harlowe books are attested (i.e., are listed as available for sale through online vendors, some commanding high prices), but not through Project Gutenberg:

- Grace Harlowe's Overland Riders in the Black Hills
- Grace Harlowe With the Yankee Shock Boys at St. Quentin
- Grace Harlowe Among the Border Guerrillas
- Grace Harlowe Overseas
- Grace Harlowe with the Marines at Château-Thierry
- Grace Harlowe with the U.S. Troops in the Argonne
- Grace Harlowe with the Red Cross in France
