= Maiya Williams =

American screenwriter

- Born: December 18, 1962 (age 63); Corvallis, Oregon, U.S.
- Education: Harvard University (BA) University of California Los Angeles (MA)
- Occupations: Screenwriter; television producer; author
- Spouse: Patric M. Verrone
- Children: 3
- Relatives: Carroll B. Williams Jr. (Father)
- Website: www.maiyawilliams.com

Maiya Williams (born December 18, 1962) is an American author, television producer, and screenwriter.

== Early life and education ==
Williams was born in Corvallis, Oregon, the daughter of notable forester Carroll B. Williams, Jr. Williams grew up in New Haven, Connecticut and Berkeley, California. She attended Berkeley High School, and graduated from Harvard College in 1984 where she was editor and vice president of The Harvard Lampoon. She was the first African American woman elected to the magazine and the first African American to serve as an officer. In 2024, she received a Masters in African American Studies from University of California, Los Angeles and is pursuing a PhD in U.S. History.

== Career ==
Williams has written and produced various television series including Roc, Amen, The Fresh Prince of Bel Air, The Wayans Bros., MAD TV, Rugrats, Futurama and The Haunted Hathaways. She was a co-executive producer on The Last O.G.

In 2004, Williams wrote her first book for children, The Golden Hour, a time travel adventure set in the French Revolution. The Golden Hour received the Southern California Booksellers Association Award for Best First Novel and International Reading Association Intermediate Fiction Award. Its sequels include The Hour of the Cobra (2006), set in ancient Egypt, and The Hour of the Outlaw (2007), set in nineteenth century California. The Fizzy Whiz Kid: The Rise and Fall of a Hollywood Nobody, a contemporary cautionary tale about fame, was published in 2010. Her most recent book is Middle School Cool (2014). It was re-released in 2016 under the title Kaboom Academy.

Williams serves as a writing mentor at WriteGirl.

== Personal life ==
Williams is married to TV writer Patric M. Verrone. They have three children, including playwright and author P.C. Verrone and documentary producer Mars Verrone. Williams lives in Pacific Palisades.

== Bibliography ==
=== Novels ===
- The Golden Hour (2004) ISBN 978-0-8109-9216-0
- The Hour of the Cobra (2006) ISBN 978-0-8109-5970-5
- The Hour of the Outlaw (2007) ISBN 978-0-8109-9355-6
- The Fizzy Whiz Kid: The Rise and Fall of a Hollywood Nobody (2010) ISBN 978-0-8109-8347-2
- Middle School Cool (2014) Re-released as Kaboom Academy (2016) ISBN 978-0-385-74349-5

=== Contributor ===
- SisterWriterEaters (ed. Claire LaZebnik & Ann Brown) ISBN 978-0-9981686-8-5
