= Overseas (novel) =

2012 historical fiction novel by Beatriz Williams

- Author: Beatriz Williams
- Genre: Historical fiction
- Publisher: G. P. Putnam's Sons
- Publication date: May 10, 2012
- ISBN: 9780399157646

Overseas is a 2012 historical fiction novel by Beatriz Williams.

== Reception ==
Overseas was generally well received by critics, including a starred review from Publishers Weekly, who wrote, "At heart this is a delicious story about the ultimate romantic fantasy: love that not only triumphs over time and common sense, but, once Kate overcomes Julian’s WWI-era ideas about honor, includes mind-blowing sex."

Kirkus Reviews called Overseas "an engaging romantic debut [that] cheerfully bends the rules to unite soul mates Kate and Julian, separated merely by an ocean, a world war and a century." They further noted that "Williams’ terrific premise proves impossible to sustain, but with her gift for humor, snappy dialogue and swooning romance, there's plenty to enjoy and the promise of more enjoyable escapism to come in future work."

Sarah Johnson, writing for the Historical Novel Society, highlighted Williams's skill at interweaving multiple perspectives and timelines. Johnson also praised Williams's writing skill, calling her "an impressive storyteller." She further noted that "the novel compels with its absorbing dual-period mystery and memorable dialogue, which moves from witty to achingly beautiful. Her dashing, larger-than-life hero fits the classic Edwardian mold; think Rupert Brooke of a sort, but with a less troubled personality and a killer business instinct. I’ll be first in line for whatever she writes next."
