= Norman Munro =

American publisher (1843–1894)

Norman Leslie Munro
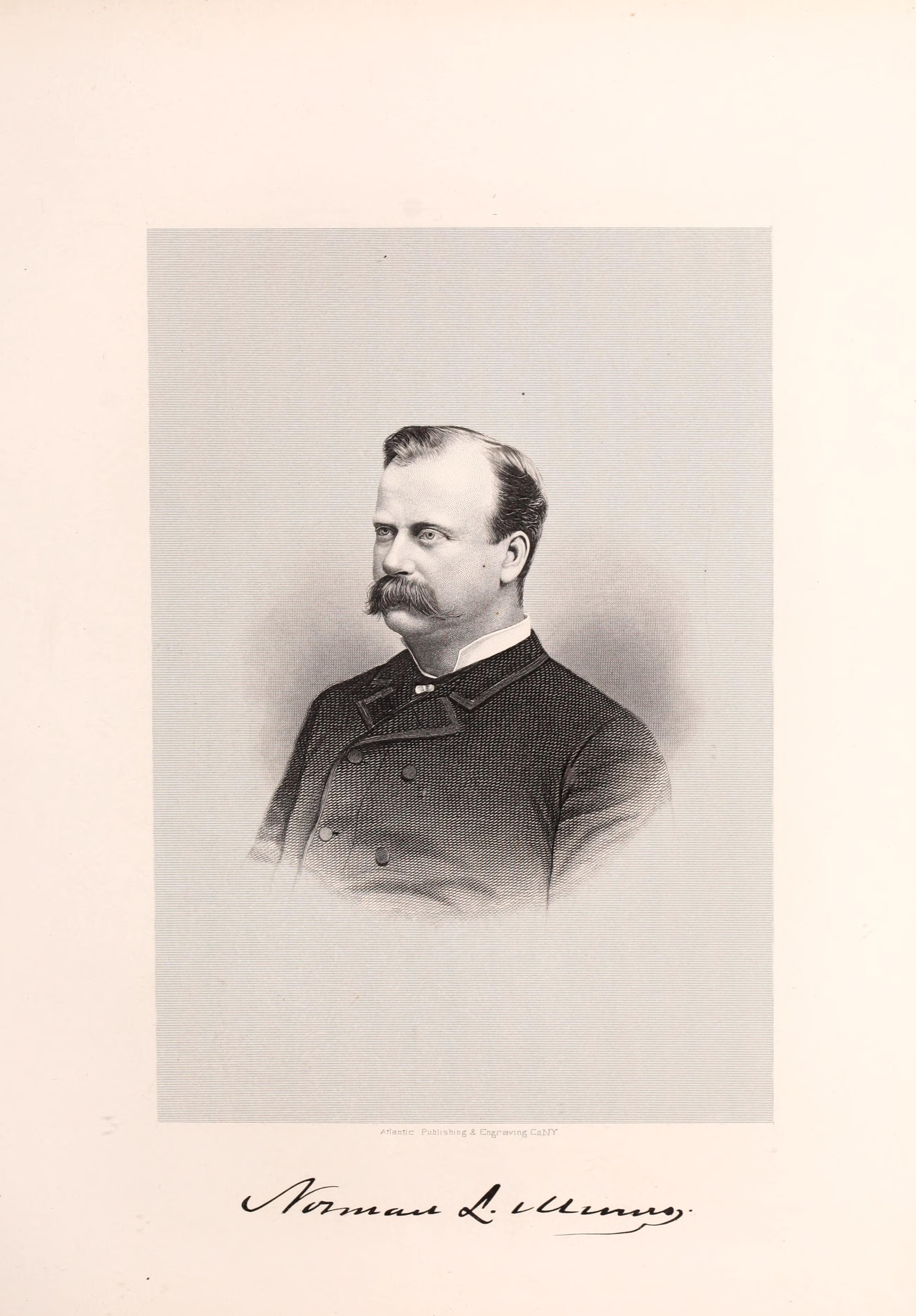
- Born: 1843; Pictou County, Nova Scotia, Canada
- Died: February 24, 1894 (aged 50–51); Manhattan, New York, U.S.
- Burial place: Green-Wood Cemetery; Brooklyn, New York, U.S.
- Occupation: Publishing
- Children: 2
- Relatives: George Munro (brother)

Norman Leslie Munro (1842–1894) was a Canadian-American publisher.

In 1873 Munro established the New York Family Story Paper, which gained a weekly circulation of 325,000. He also published Boys of New York, Our Boys, Munro's Library, and the American juvenile magazine Golden Hours in the late 19th century. One of his main writers was H. Irving Hancock. He also published Nellie Bly's 1887 investigative journalism exposé Ten Days in a Mad-House.

Throughout his life, Munro owned several fast steam yachts including the Herreshoff-designed Norwood, which garnered extensive media attention for its competition with William Randolph Hearst's rival yacht Vamoose to set speed new records. In 1887 Nathanael Greene Herreshoff designed the steam yacht Now Then for Munro.

Munro died on February 24, 1894, in New York City after an appendectomy and was survived by his wife and two children. He is buried in Green-Wood Cemetery.
