= Alice B. Emerson =

Pseudonym for the authors Betty Gordon and Ruth Fielding

Alice B. Emerson is a pseudonym used by the Stratemeyer Syndicate for the Betty Gordon and Ruth Fielding series of children's novels. The writers taking up the pen of Alice B. Emerson are not all known. However, books 1-19 of the Ruth Fielding series were written by W. Bert Foster; books 20-22 were written by Elizabeth M. Duffield Ward, and books 23-30 were written by Mildred Benson.

== Series ==
- Betty Gordon
- Ruth Fielding (30 volumes, 1913-1934)
