= H. Irving Hancock =

American writer

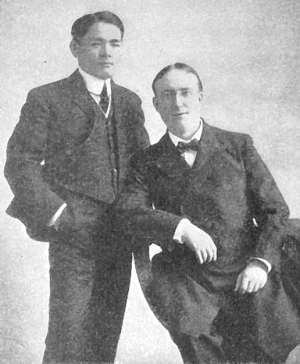
H. Irving Hancock (right) with Katsukuma Higashi.

Harrie Irving Hancock (January 16, 1868 – March 12, 1922) was an American chemist and writer, mainly remembered as an author of children's literature and juveniles in the late 19th and early 20th centuries, and as having written a fictional depiction of a German invasion of the United States.

== Biography ==
Hancock was born in Massachusetts on January 16, 1868. His parents were William Henry and Laura (Oakes) Hancock. Hancock married Nellie Stein on December 21, 1887. They had two daughters, apparently adopted: Vivian Morris Hancock and Doris Hancock.

A prolific author who liked to work at night, Hancock wrote for the New York Journal, the New York World, and Leslie's Weekly. Much of his writing was the kind of "Boy's books" initiated by the famous Stratemeyer Syndicate, based on the assumption (which proved hugely successful) that "boys want the thrill of feeling 'grown-up'" and that they like books which give them that feeling to come in series where the same heroes appear again and again. However, the bulk of Hancock's works in that genre appear to have been handled by publishers other than Stratemeyer. (A comprehensive list of his publications does not yet exist, the list appearing on this page being far from complete).

For some time it was considered that, unlike other writers, he invariably used his own name, in the form "H. Irving Hancock". However, Edward T. LeBlanc and J. Randolph Cox, who researched the period's "dime novels", concluded that a series of books attributed to "Douglas Wells" were in fact written by Hancock.

The same researchers recount that Hancock "had been a journalist for the Boston Globe from 1885 to 1890 [and] produced more than 50 serials for Norman Munro's juvenile magazine Golden Hours between 1889 and 1901." In 1898 Hancock travelled to Cuba with the US forces as one of several "embedded" reporters and published an account of his war experiences later the same year under the title What One Man Saw, Being the Personal Impressions of a War Correspondent in Cuba. He also reported on the US-Spanish war in the Philippines.

His output included westerns, detective stories (set in New Orleans and in Asia), and historical adventures. China and Japan were the setting of such stories as 'The Great Tan-To; or Dick Brent's Adventures in Up-to-Date Japan'." Hancock was charged with perpetuating racial stereotypes in his depiction of the Chinese "Supervillain" Li Shoon in a series of stories published between 1915 and 1917". Conversely, he had a sympathetic attitude toward Japan, setting stories there and coauthoring a book on ju-jitsu with a noted Japanese adept in the art.

Hancock's experience as a war correspondent provided inspiration for books about the Spanish–American War. He also published books on physical fitness and an Encyclopedia of Knowledge and Manners, and served as the editor of a "History of West Point". In a magazine article he warned of the dangers of smoking, at a time when such dangers were not widely known. He was also apparently a sports writer and an early Western expert on Jiu-Jitsu.

Much of Hancock's writing had a patriotic character, his books and stories having a considerable proportion of military heroes placed in settings ranging from the American Revolutionary War, through the Spanish–American War and the First World War, and up to an imaginary German invasion of the United States (see following section).

In addition to his writing activity, Hancock organized the Ferguson-Hancock Laboratories together with Prof. George A. Ferguson in 1908.

Hancock died of liver ailments at his home, in Blue Point, Suffolk County, New York on March 12, 1922.

Despite the enormous amount of material published by Hancock, some of his biographical details are not completely clear. The 1920 United States Federal Census contains the following: "H. Hancock, Birth: abt 1868 – Massachusetts Residence: 1920 – Brookhaven, Suffolk, New York". This seems to refer to Harrie Irving Hancock, but it is not completely certain—hence the above question mark following the date of his birth.

According to Gene Horton of Blue Point, Hancock is buried in an unmarked grave at the Blue Point Cemetery.

One Hancock book still in print is The Complete Kano Jiu-Jitsu (Judo), co-authored with Katsukuma Higashi and originally published by G. P. Putnam & Sons in 1905 in New York (presently republished by Dover Publications).

== "The Invasion of the United States" ==
Hancock's four-book series The Invasion of the United States, published in 1916, depicted a fictional invasion of the United States by Germany in 1920–21—reflecting, and to some degree helping to intensify, the shift of American public opinion towards getting involved in the First World War. It was an American representative of the subgenre known as invasion literature which originated in Britain and was frequent in the early Twentieth Century. This kind of book was criticised —by some politicians at the time and by historians and researchers later— with intensifying bellicose public attitudes in various countries and contributing to escalation and war. Others treated them as reasonable anticipations of the current situation, such as Arthur Conan Doyle’s 1912 story “Danger!”, in which Britain is brought to her knees by an unnamed power cutting off her food supplies using submarine warfare.

The series may have been influenced by William Le Queux's The Great War in England in 1897 (1894) in which the French launch a surprise invasion of England and penetrate into the heart of London but are finally defeated after much desperate and heroic fighting by the British protagonists. The book was highly popular in the early Twentieth Century, and Hancock is likely to have read it.

In Hancock's far more extensive version, constituting no less than four books, it is the Germans who launch a surprise attack in 1920, capture Boston despite heroic resistance by "Uncle Sam's boys", overrun all of New England and New York and reach as far as Pittsburgh—but are at last are gloriously crushed by fresh American forces. From the present-day point of view, it can be considered as "retroactive" alternate history.

Hancock's plot has a difficulty in that it assumes either an overwhelming German victory over the British, giving them mastery of the seas, or a British "friendly neutrality" and a free hand to invade America. Further, it assumes the German Navy to be capable of utterly defeating the US Navy, followed by ferrying no less than a million German troops across the Atlantic and keeping them supplied for years-long hard fighting. The experience of the first two years of the actual war, at the time of writing, already conclusively proved the Kaiserliche Marine manifestly incapable of anything remotely of the kind. In actuality it was US soldiers who—a year after the story's publication—would pour across a British-dominated Atlantic to assault Germany in Europe. Hancock, therefore, assumed that Germany had won the World War, and that the USA had not built up its Navy and Army (the men fighting remark several times that the politicians had neglected the national defense).

The war launched by the German Empire in the story is intended, not to conquer the US, but to pressure it to give up the Monroe Doctrine. This will leave Germany free to seize parts of Brazil, and take colonies elsewhere in the New World. Hancock has it follow the actual, hypothetical Imperial German plans for the invasion of the United States, involving the bombardment of New York and the seizure of Boston. A neutral or US-hostile Canada is assumed; in the story, this is because of US failure to aid Britain, leading to her defeat in the World War. Peace would then be negotiated, with a reduced US military, and parts of the Eastern Seaboard occupied by Imperial German troops, as a guarantee against further opposition to German plans for expansion

However, alternate history writer and analyst Dale Cozort notes that "(...)The broad outline of the war [depicted] is so much like what actually happened between Germany and Russia 25 or so years later, in World War II, that it's almost uncanny. The Germans win battle after battle but the opposition moves industry out of their reach, builds up overwhelming superiority in manpower and strategic mobility, then cuts off the cream of the German army. Sounds a lot like Eastern Front World War II up through Stalingrad". Cozort also notes that Hancock's is one of the first fictional depictions of war to make reference to tanks.

Hancock appears to have been among the first American writers to graphically describe their country being devastatingly invaded by powerful enemies—reflecting the disruption of the hitherto dominant American isolationist mindset. In later decades he was followed by a host of others depicting the US being fictionally invaded by Nazi Germany, Imperial Japan, the Soviet Union and China, as well as a considerable array of extraterrestrial aliens (see Invasion literature, Yellow Peril, Earth in fiction, The Man in the High Castle, The Ultimate Solution). In effect, this subgenre went full circle with the alternative history novel 1901 by Robert Conroy, depicting a fictitious invasion of the United States by Kaiser Wilhelm's Germany in the title year, bearing quite a bit of resemblance to Hancock's work. They may have both drawn from the same set of speculative war plans made by the German Empire.

== Partial list of writings ==
=== Juvenile series ===
- Motor Boat Club Series (list of books follows)
- The Grammar School Boys/Dick & Co. Series (list of books follows)
- The High School Boys Series
- The High School Boys' Vacation Series
- West Point Series (list of books follows)
- Annapolis Series (list of books follows)
- The Dave Darrin Series
- Young Engineer (or Young Engineers) Series
- The Invasion of the United States Series (list of books follows)
- Uncle Sam's Boys Series (list of books follows)

Many of Hancock's books also appeared in the Street and Smith's "Bound to Win" series (see the following).

=== In the Street and Smith's "Bound to Win" series ===
- 14) "His One Ambition; or, The Boy Reporter". 1892, 1903
- 38) "Captain of the Minute Men; or, The Concord Boys of 1775", 1890, 1903
- 69) "The Prince of Grit; or, A Sample American Boy", 1899, 1904
- 75) "The Three Hills of Gold; or, A Marvelous Legacy",1894, 1904
- 96) "The Young Diplomat; or, The Czar of Toddsland", 1894, 1904.
- 108) "Frank Bolton's Chase; or, A Long Hunt in the Dark", 1890, 1905.
- 119) "Compound Interest; or, The Boy and the Miser", 1895, 1905.
- 130) "The Boys' Revolt; or, Right Against Might", 1899, 1905.
- 137) "The Boy King-Maker; or, A Fearful Awakening", 1900, 1905.
- 142) "In the Path of Duty; or, The Adventure of a Young Policeman", 1900, 1905.
- 148) "Fighting the Cowards; or, Among the Moonshiners", 1904, 1905.
- 165) "On a Phantom Trail; or, A Clue from Nowhere", 1902, 1906.

=== The Motor Boat Club Series ===
- "The Motor Boat Club Of The Kennebec; or, The Secret of Smugglers' Island", 1909, Altemus.
- "The Motor Boat Club At Nantucket; or, The Mystery of the Dunstan Heir", 1909, Altemus.
- "The Motor Boat Club Off Long Island; or, A Daring Marine Game at Racing Speed" 1909, Altemus.
- "The Motor Boat Club And The Wireless; or, The Dot, Dash, and Dare Cruise", 1909, Altemus.
- "The Motor Boat Club In Florida; or, Laying the Ghost of Alligator Swamp", 1909, Altemus.
- "The Motor Boat Club At The Golden Gate; or, A Thrilling Capture in the Great Fog",1909, Altemus.
- "The Motor Boat Club On The Great Lakes; or, The 'Flying Dutchman' of the Big Fresh Water", 1912, Altemus.

=== The Grammar School Boys Series ===
- "The Grammar School Boys Of Gridley; or, Dick & Co. Start Things Moving", 1911, Altemus.
- "The Grammar School Boys Snowbound; or, Dick & Co. at Winter Sports" 1911, Altemus.
- "The Grammar School Boys In The Woods; or, Dick & Co.'s Trail Fun and Knowledge", 1911, Altemus.
- "The Grammar School Boys In Summer Athletics; or, Dick & Co., Make Their Fame Secure", 1911, Altemus.

Note: many of the above books were reprinted by the Saafield Company, after the Henry Altemus Company failed. The Saafield editions are on high acid content paper, and few surviving copies are in good condition. The Altemus books are far superior in quality.

=== The Invasion of the United States Series ===
Note: the series, published in 1916, describes a fictional German invasion of the US, dated in 1920–21.

- 1) "The Invasion of the United States; or, Uncle Sam's Boys at the Capture of Boston", Altemus, 1916 (28898885, microfilm)
- 2) "In the Battle for New York; or, Uncle Sam's Boys in the Desperate Struggle for the Metropolis", Altemus, 1916 (28898910, microfilm)
- 3) "At the Defense of Pittsburgh; or, The Struggle to Save America's 'Fighting Steel' Supply", Altemus, 1916 (28898921, microfilm)
- 4) "Making the Last Stand for Old Glory; or, Uncle Sam's Boys in the Last Frantic Drive", Altemus, 1916 (28898929, microfilm)

=== Uncle Sam's Boys Series ===
- "Uncle Sam's Boys in the Ranks: or, Two Recruits in the United States Army"
- "Uncle Sam's Boys on Field Duty: or, Winning Corporal's Chevrons"
- "Uncle Sam's Boys as Sergeants: or, Handling Their First Real Commands"
- "Uncle Sam's Boys in the Philippines: or, Following the Flag Against the Moros"
- "Uncle Sam's Boys on their Mettle: or, a Chance to Win Officers' Commissions"
- "Uncle Sam's Boys as Lieutenants: or, Serving Old Glory as Line Officers"
- "Uncle Sam's Boys with Pershing's Troops at the Front: or, Dick Prescott at Grips with the Boche"
- "Uncle Sam's Boys Smash the Germans: or, Helping the Allies Wind Up the Great World War"

=== Detective books ===
- "Detective Johnson of New Orleans" (J. S. Ogilive 1891)
- “His Evil Eye” (J.S. Ogilive, 1891)
- “Inspector Henderson, The Central Office Detective,” (J.S. Ogilive Publishing Company – no date given, but refers to "His Evil Eye”—so after 1891)
- “Black-Mail, A Central Office Problem" (Smith and Street, 1899)

The Ogilive books are stated to have been part of a yearly subscription service, The Sunset Series (cost $9.00).

=== The Annapolis Series ===
- "Dave Darrin's First Year at Annapolis" 1910, Altemus
- "Dave Darrin's Second Year at Annapolis" 1911, Altemus
- "Dave Darrin's Third Year at Annapolis" 1911, Altemus
- "Dave Darrin's Fourth Year at Annapolis" 1911, Altemus

=== The Dave Darrin Series ===
- "Dave Darrin at Vera Cruz" 1914, Altemus
- "Dave Darrin After the Mine Layers" 1919, Altemus
- "Dave Darrin's South American Cruise" 1919, Altemus
- "Dave Darrin on Mediterranean Service" 1919, Altemus
- "Dave Darrin on the Asiatic Station" 1919, Altemus
- "Dave Darrin and the German Submarines" 1919, Altemus

=== The West Point Series ===
- "Dick Prescott's First Year at West Point"
- "Dick Prescott's Second Year at West Point: Finding the Glory of the Soldier's Life"
- "Dick Prescott's Third Year at West Point: Standing Firm for Flag and Honor"
- "Dick Prescott's Fourth Year at West Point: Ready to Drop the Gray for Shoulder Straps"

=== Other books ===
- "What One Man Saw, Being the Personal Impressions of a War Correspondent in Cuba". 1898, Street & Smith, New York.
- Physical fitness books (for Business Men, for Women, for Children, etc.)
- Japanese Physical Training: The System of Exercise, Diet, and General Mode of Living that Has Made the Mikado's People the Healthiest, Strongest, and Happiest Men and Women in the World (1903) published by G. P. Putnam's Sons
- "Jiu-Jitsu Combat Tricks: Japanese Feats of Attack & Defense in Personal Encounter"
- "The Complete Kano Jiu-Jitsu (Judo)" (1905), originally published by G. P. Putnam & Sons; still in print by Dover.
- "Aguinaldo's Hostage"
- "What One Man Saw"
- "Life at West Point"
- "Chuggins: the Youngest Hero With the Army: a Tale of the Capture of Santiago" (in Cuba).
- "Bountyville Boys" (D. Appleton and Company, 1907).

Hancock may also have written the Submarine Boys series of young adult books pseudonymously as Victor G. Durham.

=== Partial list of magazine stories and articles ===
- "The Great Tan-To; or Dick Brent’s Adventures in Up-to-Date Japan".
- "Ku-Klux; The Three Strangers and the Georgia Moonshines" in Golden Hours, August 3, 1895. (Hancock is there mentioned as the "Author of 'The Meanest Boy on Earth,' 'Three Scamps,' 'Yank & Gap,' 'The Red Roy,' 'The Young Diplomat,' etc., etc.")
- "Fighting in the Philippines; A Real American Boy's Share in Founding Our New Empire", in Golden Hours, October 7, 1899. (The story is introduced as having been "Written in Manila by our War Correspondent, Harrie Irving Hancock" and is mentioned as being "A Companion Story to 'Off with the Third'".)
- A series of stories featuring Frank Manley appeared in Young Athlete's Weekly and Frank Manley's Weekly in 1905 and 1906.
- "Under the Ban of Li Shoon", Detective Story Magazine, Vol. 4, No. 3, cover date August 5, 1916.
- "Li Shoon's Deadliest Mission", Detective Story Magazine, September 5, 1916
- Other Li Shoon stories were published in that magazine in 1917
- "Don'ts for U.S. Soldiers" (a guide for the U. S. Doughboys headed to France), 1917.
