= Our Woman in Moscow =

2021 historical fiction novel by Beatriz Williams

- Author: Beatriz Williams
- Genre: Historical fiction
- Publisher: William Morrow and Company
- Publication date: June 1, 2021
- ISBN: 9780063020788

Our Woman in Moscow is a 2021 historical fiction novel by Beatriz Williams.

== Reception ==
Our Woman in Moscow was generally well received by critics, included a starred review from Library Journal.

Jane Jorgenson, writing for Library Journal, highlighted Williams's strength in telling the story "from the perspective of three different women," further noting that Williams "expertly shifts between family drama and a suspenseful espionage plot, and makes every word and note count."

Katherine A. Powers, writing for The Star Tribune, also discussed Williams's successfully suspenseful plot, stating that "what the main characters are really up to is not what it seems. The pace picks up and the plot races into white-knuckle territory. If Our Woman in Moscow does not rise to the diabolic heights—or terrifying depths—of many novels in the field, it is a fine entertainment with, as it happens, a kindly heart."

Booklist's Bill Ott called Our Woman in Moscow an "engaging tale of Cold War espionage," noting that though "the setup reeks of melodrama," Williams succeeds in "effectively juggling" the perspectives of three characters and "moves back and forth in time to build all the principals into full-bodied characters while delivering detail-rich portraits of wartime Italy, glittery fifties Manhattan, and grayed-out Moscow."

In contrast to the above, Kirkus Reviews indicated that the characters are not fully developed: "Iris is the most fully developed and sympathetic character here. Ruth is another iteration of the wisecracking dame who has appeared in so many Williams novels, and Lyudmila seems patterned after Greta Garbo in Ninotchka, except that this doctrinaire minion of Stalin wouldn’t be caught dead in a rom-com." They also added that the "cumbersome plot weighs down this would-be spy thriller."
