= All the Ways We Said Goodbye =

2020 historical novel

- Author: Beatriz Williams, Lauren Willig, and Karen White
- Genre: Historical fiction
- Publisher: William Morrow and Company
- Publication date: January 14, 2020
- ISBN: 9780062931092

All the Ways We Said Goodbye is a 2020 historical novel co-written by Beatriz Williams, Lauren Willig, and Karen White.

== Reception ==
All the Ways We Said Goodbye was well received by critics, including a starred review from Library Journal.

Shelf Awareness's Jaclyn Fulwood said the book is "filled with hopeless passion and brave deeds in the face of evil." Fulwood added that "though its secrets are easily guessed, this rewarding journey of intra-era connections will charm historical fiction readers and Team W's fans."

Booklist also reviewed the novel.
