= The Summer Wives =

2018 historical fiction novel by Beatriz Williams

- Author: Beatriz Williams
- Genre: Historical fiction
- Publisher: William Morrow and Company
- Publication date: May 30, 2013

The Summer Wives is a 2018 historical fiction novel by Beatriz Williams.

== Reception ==
The Summer Wives was well received by critics, including a starred review from Kirkus Reviews, who said "With just the right touch of bitters, Williams [...] mixes a satisfyingly tempestuous—and eminently beachworthy."

Library Journal's Stacy Hayman highlighted how Williams "displays a mastery of character building while thoughtfully planting evocative details about the setting and the era's social structures. The intricate and complex web of relationships within stated conventions are skillfully created and add depth to the narrative."

USA Today's Patty Rhule also praised Williams's skill at character development, noting that "Miranda is a beautifully crafted character." Rhule ultimately gave the book 3.5 out of 4 stars.

Writing for Entertainment Weekly, Maureen Lee Lenker discussed Williams "knack for the obscured whisperings and yearnings of women’s lives," pointing to how she successfully writes "Miranda’s journey in both timelines with a keen eye for the wounds unique to both the first flushes of teenage love and an older, deeper, more enduring ache." Lenker further praised Williams's strength as a historical fiction writer, saying she has a "particular gift as a writer [for] peeling back the pages of history to breathe life into the interior lives of women [...] But Williams also never falls into the trap of nostalgia, always taking care to draw back the curtain on this sparkling world to show the rottenness at its core."

Booklist's Nicole Foti wrote that Williams's "writing is precise and descriptive, and reading The Summer Wives is like watching a film, complete with love and drama to be envied, bemoaned, and enjoyed."

== Awards and honors ==
The Summer Wives was nominated for the 2018 Goodreads Choice Award for Historical Fiction.
