= The Forgotten Room =

2016 historical fiction novel

- Author: Karen White, Lauren Willig, and Beatriz Williams
- Genre: Historical fiction
- Publisher: Berkley Books
- Publication date: January 19, 2016
- ISBN: 9780451474629

The Forgotten Room is a 2016 historical fiction novel by Karen White, Lauren Willig, and Beatriz Williams.

== Reception ==
The Forgotten Room was well received by critics, including a starred review from Booklist.

Booklist's Rebecca Vnuk highlighted how "the authors do a wonderful job of slowly teasing out the details while keeping the different story lines moving along." Vnuk concluded by writing, "Strong female characters, swoon-worthy romance, and red herrings abound in this marvelous genre blend of romance, historical fiction, and family saga."

Kirkus Reviews highlighted the ways in which the three stories intersect: "With all three stories taking place in the same location, the novel is filled with both coincidences and parallels, the past finding ways to repeat itself until it reaches a satisfying conclusion. Even with three authors, the story is seamless, and the transitions between narrators are smooth."

On behalf of Shelf Awareness, Elyse Dinh-McCrillis wrote, "White, Williams and Willig have pulled off an impressive feat: combining their voices seamlessly. Even if their respective fans think they know each author's style well, it's difficult to discern who wrote what. While the stories are engrossing and the narrators strong-willed women, a suspension of disbelief is needed because the arc of the novel depends on coincidence occurring more than once. Then again, maybe it's not coincidence, but fate."
