= The Beach at Summerly =

2023 historical fiction novel by Beatriz Williams

- Author: Beatriz Williams
- Genre: Historical fiction
- Publisher: William Morrow & Company
- Publication date: June 27, 2023
- ISBN: 9780063020849

The Beach at Summerly is a 2023 historical fiction novel by Beatriz Williams.

== Reception ==
The Beach at Summerly has been well received by critics, including a starred review from Library Journal.

Library Journal's Stacey Hayman wrote, "This page-turner has depth of feeling and intriguing historical details that will sweep readers off their feet." Hayman also highlighted that "the novel’s well-developed characters engage readers’ emotions while representing a variety of economic and political viewpoints."

Kirkus Reviews said the novel is "a well-researched exploration of love and redemption against the backdrop of post–World War II New England."

Star Tribune's Laurie Hertzel called The Beach at Summerly "a fascinating novel about love, class, loyalty and money." Hertzel further noted that the jumps between 1940s Massachusetts and 1950s Connecticut "might confuse you at first, but they’re meant to. Stick with it. You won’t be sorry."

Booklist and The New York Times also reviewed the novel.
