= Make Way for Tomorrow =

1937 film by Leo McCarey

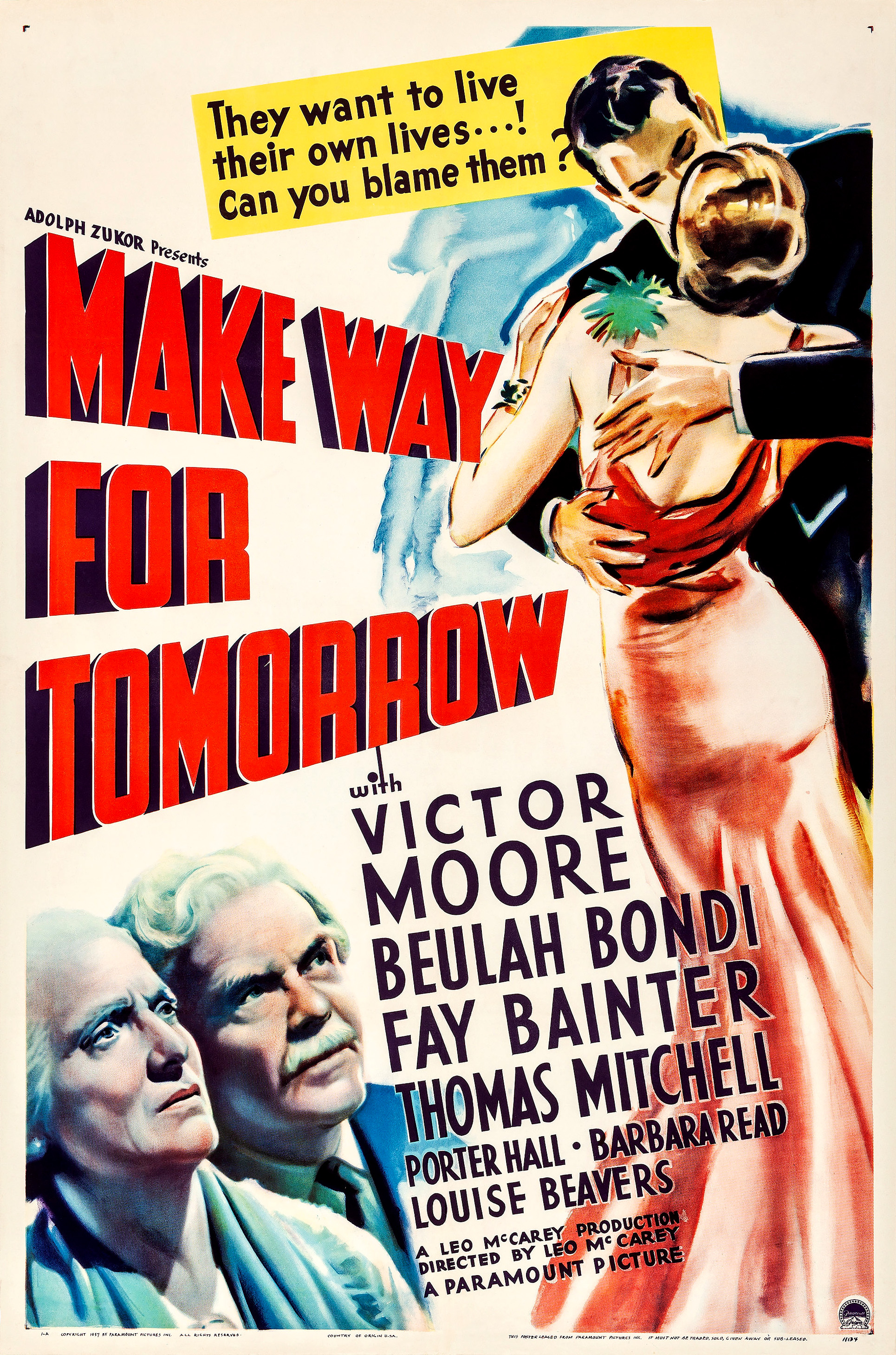
- Theatrical release poster
- Directed by: Leo McCarey
- Screenplay by: Viña Delmar
- Based on: The Years Are So Long 1934 novel by Josephine Lawrence; The Years Are So Long 1935 play by Helen Leary Noah Leary
- Produced by: Leo McCarey; Adolph Zukor
- Starring: Victor Moore; Beulah Bondi; Fay Bainter; Thomas Mitchell
- Cinematography: William C. Mellor
- Edited by: LeRoy Stone
- Music by: George Antheil; Victor Young
- Production company: Paramount Pictures
- Distributed by: Paramount Pictures
- Release date: May 9, 1937
- Running time: 92 minutes
- Country: United States
- Language: English

Contemporary trailer for the film

Make Way for Tomorrow is a 1937 American tragedy film directed by Leo McCarey. The plot concerns an elderly couple (played by Victor Moore and Beulah Bondi) who are forced to separate when they lose their house and none of their five children will take both parents.

The film was written by Viña Delmar, from a play by Helen and Noah Leary, which was in turn based on the novel Years Are So Long by advice columnist Josephine Lawrence. McCarey viewed the film as his best, and it has been praised by later critics. In 2010, it was selected for preservation with 24 other films in the National Film Registry by the Library of Congress.

== Plot ==
Barkley "Bark" (Victor Moore) and Lucy Cooper (Beulah Bondi) are an elderly couple who lose their home to foreclosure, as Barkley has been unable to find employment because of his age. They summon four of their five children—the fifth lives thousands of miles away in California—to break the news and decide where they will live until they can get back on their feet. Only one of the children, Nell (Minna Gombell), has enough space for both, but she asks for three months to talk her husband into the idea. In the meantime, the temporary solution is for the parents to each live with a different child.

The two burdened families find their parents' presence bothersome. Nell's efforts to talk her husband into helping are half-hearted and achieve no success, and she reneges on her promise to eventually take them. While Barkley continues looking for work to allow him and his wife to live independently again, he has little or no prospect of success. When Lucy continues to speak optimistically of the day that he will find work, her teenage granddaughter bluntly advises her to "face facts" that it will never happen because of his age. Lucy's sad reply is to say that at her age, the only fun left is pretending.

With no end in sight to the uncomfortable living situations, both host families look for a way to get the parent they are hosting out of their house. When Barkley catches a cold, his daughter Cora (Elisabeth Risdon) seizes upon it as a pretext to assert that his health demands a milder climate, thus necessitating that he move to California to live with his daughter Addie.

Meanwhile, son George (Thomas Mitchell) and his wife Anita (Fay Bainter) plan to move Lucy into a retirement home. Lucy accidentally finds out, but rather than force George into the awkward position of breaking the news to her, she goes to him first and claims that she wants to move into the home. Barkley resigns himself to his fate of having to move thousands of miles away, though he is aware of his daughter's true motivation.

On the day Barkley is to depart by train, he and Lucy make plans to spend one last afternoon together before having a farewell dinner with the four children. They have a fantastic time strolling around the city and reminiscing about their happy years together, visiting the hotel in which they had stayed on their honeymoon 50 years ago. Their day is made pleasant partly because of the kindness of people they encounter, who, although strangers, treat them with deference and respect—in stark contrast to the treatment they are receiving from their children.

Barkley and Lucy decide to continue their wonderful day by skipping the farewell dinner and dining at the hotel instead; when Barkley informs their daughter with a phone call, it prompts introspection among the four children. Son Robert (Ray Meyer) suggests that each of the children has always known that collectively they are good for nothing. George notes that it is now so late in the evening that they don't have time to meet their parents at the train station to send off their father. He says that he deliberately let the time pass until it was too late because he figured their parents would prefer to be alone. Nell objects that if they don't go to the station, their parents "will think we're terrible," to which George matter-of-factly replies, "Aren't we?"

At the train station, Lucy and Barkley say their farewells. Barkley tells Lucy that he will quickly find a job in California and send for her; Lucy agrees that she is sure he will.

They then offer each other a truly final goodbye, “just in case" they do not see each other again because "anything could happen." Each makes a heartfelt statement reaffirming their lifelong love. Barkley boards the train, and they wave to each other through the closed window as the train pulls off, prompting a somber Lucy to turn away.

== Cast ==
- Victor Moore as Barkley "Pa" Cooper
- Beulah Bondi as Lucy "Ma" Cooper
- Fay Bainter as Anita Cooper, George's wife
- Thomas Mitchell as George Cooper, Barkley's and Lucy's son
- Porter Hall as Harvey Chase, Nellie's husband
- Barbara Read as Rhoda Cooper, George's and Anita's daughter
- Maurice Moscovitch as Max Rubens, the Jewish shopkeeper and Barkley's friend
- Elisabeth Risdon as Cora Payne, Barkley's and Lucy's daughter
- Minna Gombell as Nellie Chase, Barkley's and Lucy's daughter
- Ray Meyer as Robert Cooper, Barkley's and Lucy's son (credited as Ray Mayer)
- Ralph Remley as Bill Payne, Cora's husband
- Louise Beavers as Mamie, maid of George and Anita
- Louis Jean Heydt as Barkley's doctor
- Gene Morgan as Carlton Gorman, bandleader at the hotel

Uncredited:

- Dell Henderson as Ed Weldon, auto salesman
- Louise Seidel as Hat Check Girl at the hotel
- Paul Stanton as Mr. Horton, hotel manager
- Gene Lockhart as Mr. Henning
- Ellen Drew as Usherette
- Nick Lukats as Boyfriend

== Background ==
Make Way For Tomorrow is loosely based on the novel Years Are So Long (1934) by Josephine Lawrence and the stage production by Helen and Nolan Leary.

McCarey's loss of his beloved father, Thomas McCarey, in 1936 inspired the film which serves as a tribute to his parents' generation.

== Production ==
Beulah Bondi, who played "Ma", was younger and wore make-up to appear older.

== Reception ==
Writing for Night and Day magazine of London in 1937, Graham Greene gave the film a neutral review, summarizing it as "a depressing picture about an old couple". Greene noted that the overall effect the audience receives is "a sense of misery and inhumanity ... left vibrating in the nerves", and commented that the description from Paramount gave a distinctly different expectation of the actual film.

Archer Winsten in the New York Post wrote that director McCarey “had the guts to lay strong hands on a tragic subject and follow it to the end without a single concession to popular taste.”

McCarey himself believed that it was his finest film. When he accepted his Academy Award for Best Director for The Awful Truth, which was released the same year, he said, "Thanks, but you gave it to me for the wrong picture."

Make Way for Tomorrow earned good reviews when originally released in Japan, where it was seen by screenwriter Kogo Noda. Years later, it provided an inspiration for the script of Tokyo Story (1953), written by Noda and director Yasujirō Ozu.

Orson Welles said of the film, "It would make a stone cry," and rhapsodized about his enthusiasm for the film in his 1992 book-length series of interviews with Peter Bogdanovich. In Newsweek magazine, famed documentary filmmaker Errol Morris named it his #1 film, stating "The most depressing movie ever made, providing reassurance that everything will definitely end badly."

On February 11, 2010, Roger Ebert added this film to his Great Movies list, writing:

"Make Way for Tomorrow" (1937) is a nearly-forgotten American film made in the Depression ... The great final arc of "Make Way for Tomorrow" is beautiful and heartbreaking. It's easy to imagine it being sentimentalized by a studio executive, being made more upbeat for the audience. That's not McCarey. What happens is wonderful and very sad. Everything depends on the performances.

Also in February 2010, the film was released by the Criterion Collection, whose website describes it as

one of the great unsung Hollywood masterpieces, an enormously moving Depression-era depiction of the frustrations of family, aging, and the generation gap ... Make Way for Tomorrow is among American cinema's purest tearjerkers, all the way to its unflinching ending, which McCarey refused to change despite studio pressure.

In interviews filmed for the Criterion release, Gary Giddins and Peter Bogdanovich summarize the film's message as to be kind to others, especially ones' family or elders. Giddins posits that, without being political, the film provides an argument for Social Security (which was being implemented in the United States at the time of the film's release). Both Giddins and Bogdanovich argue that the film avoided derogatory ethnic stereotypes by humanizing the supporting characters of the Black maid and the Jewish merchant.

On the review aggregator website Rotten Tomatoes, 100% of 22 critics' reviews are positive, with an average rating of 9.1/10.

In late 2010, the film was selected for preservation in the United States National Film Registry by the Library of Congress as being "culturally, historically, or aesthetically" significant.

== Adaptations ==
It has been adapted many times including in Marathi as Oon Paus (1954), in Urdu as Insaniyat (1976) Pakistani film, in Tamil as Varavu Nalla Uravu (1990), in Telugu as Dabbu Bhale Jabbu (1992), in Malayalam as Achan Kombathu Amma Varampathu (1995) and in Hindi as Zindagi (1976), and Baghban (2003).

== Sources ==
- Gehring, Wes D. 2005. Leo McCarey: From Marx to McCarthy. The Scarecrow Press. Lantham, Maryland, Toronto, Oxford. ISBN 0-8108-5263-2
