= Submarine Boys =

Akeporn Siwilai

- Author: Victor G. Durham
- Country: United States
- Language: English
- Genre: Young adult, adventure, war fiction
- Publisher: Henry Altemus Company
- Published: 1909–1920
- Media type: Print
- No. of books: 9

The Submarine Boys, by Victor G. Durham, is a series of adventure books for boys, published by Henry Altemus Company, Philadelphia, Pennsylvania, from 1909 through 1920. The series featured three sixteen-year-old boys and their underwater adventures.

Victor G. Durham was most likely a pen name, possibly of H. Irving Hancock. He is also referred to as "Lieutenant-commander Victor G. Durham"

== Content ==
Characters in the series include: David Pollard, an 'innovator'; Jacob Farnum, a shipbuilder; Jack Benson, the captain; and Hal Hastings, Eph Somers and Williamson, all crew.

Submarines in the series include the Pollard, the Farnum, the Benson, the Hastings, the Somers and the Spitfire.

== Series titles ==
- 1. The Submarine Boys on Duty; Life on a Diving Torpedo Boat, 1909
- 2. The Submarine Boys' Trial Trip; or,"Making good" as Young Experts, 1909
- 3. The Submarine Boys and the Middies; Or, The Prize Detail at Annapolis, 1909
- 4. The Submarine Boys and the Spies; Or, Dodging the Sharks of the Deep, 1910
- 5. The Submarine Boys' Lightning Cruise; Or, The Young Kings of the Deep, 1910
- 6. The Submarine Boys For the Flag; Or, Deeding Their Lives to Uncle Sam, 1910
- 7. The Submarine Boys and the Smugglers; Or, Breaking Up the New Jersey Customs Frauds, 1912
- 8. The Submarine Boys' Secret Mission; or, Beating an Ambassador's Game, 1920
- 9. The Submarine Boys Stern Chase (not published)
