= The Complete Kano Jiu-Jitsu (Judo) =

1905 Jiu-Jitsu book

- Author: H. Irving Hancock and Katsukuma Higashi
- Language: English
- Publisher: G. P. Putnam's Sons
- Publication date: 1905
- ISBN: 9780486206394
- OCLC: 650089326

The Complete Kano Jiu-Jitsu (Judo) (1905) is a martial arts manual that documents a system of jiu-jitsu that was taught by a Japanese Instructor at the United States Naval Academy. It was written by H. Irving Hancock as part of a series of books on Japanese martial arts, with technical expertise from Katsukuma Higashi, a practitioner of 'Kano Jiu Jitsu'.

== Overview ==
The book describes 160 combat 'tricks', including techniques designed to kill or injure. It also contains more than five hundred illustrations of ways in which a person can throw, arm lock, or strangle an opponent. One chapter is dedicated to kuatsu, or methods to revive someone who has been rendered unconscious. The book also contains charts of pressure points, which when struck, may debilitate an opponent.

== Criticism ==
While at the time of its first publication it was reported that the book describes the Kano system of jiu jitsu, used by the Japanese army, navy, and police, or the official jiu-jitsu of the Japanese government. This is contested and the style presented is not that of Kodokan Judo. Kanō Jigorō himself had no involvement with the book.
