= A Hundred Summers =

2013 historical fiction novel by Beatriz Williams

- Author: Beatriz Williams
- Genre: Historical fiction
- Publisher: G.P. Putnam's Sons
- Publication date: May 30, 2013
- ISBN: 9780399162169

A Hundred Summers is a 2013 historical fiction novel by Beatriz Williams.

== Background ==
In an interview with the Jewish Book Council, Williams said A Hundred Summers was inspired by Edith Wharton’s The House of Mirth, including the novel's “extremely stereotyped Jewish character. This Waspy woman ends up killing herself because she would never lower herself to marry a Jew, even though her financial problems would have been solved. This got me thinking ‘what if they married...’ I became intrigued by what it would be like for Nick, a Jew, to be placed in that particular society during the 1930s.”

Because Williams is not Jewish, she did not want to include overt messages about Judaism or antisemitism into A Hundred Summers; instead these ideas exist as a "subtle strain" throughout the text.

== Reception ==
A Hundred Summers received mixed reviews from critics.

Elise Cooper, writing for the Jewish Book Council, said the novel "is a fascinating look into the lives of New Yorkers during the 1930s."

Writing for Shelf Awareness, Jaclyn Fulwood called the novel "unrelentingly romantic" and noted that "Williams evokes the era effortlessly and delights in ripping the rug out from under the reader just when the riddles seem easiest to solve."

Kirkus Reviews said the novel is "an elegant if somewhat old-fashioned delayed-gratification seaside romance with a flavor of Daphne du Maurier."

Library Journal's Jane Jorgenson provided a mixed review, writing, "While Williams's new novel [...] starts strongly, it becomes a bit mired in melodrama in the latter third." Jorgenson highlighted the lack of character development for secondary characters, noting that "only Lily and Nick are fleshed out as characters." They concluded by saying, "The lack of development of the supporting cast weakens the eventual exploration of just what happened."

Another mixed review came from Publishers Weekly, who noted that Williams "is good at is love (and, relatedly, sex)," but "complicated plotting" hindered the novel.

Booklist also reviewed the novel.

== Awards and honors ==
A Hundred Summers was nominated for the 2013 Goodreads Choice Award for Historical Fiction.
