= The Glass Ocean (novel) =

2018 historical fiction novel

- Author: Beatriz Williams, Lauren Willig, and Karen White
- Genre: Historical fiction
- Publisher: William Morrow and Company
- Publication date: September 4, 2018
- ISBN: 9780062642479

The Glass Ocean is a 2018 historical fiction novel co-written by Beatriz Williams, Lauren Willig, and Karen White.

== Reception ==
The Glass Ocean was well received by critics, including a starred review from Publishers Weekly.

Publishers Weekly highlighted how "the story is seamlessly narrated in alternating chapters by two American women aboard the British luxury liner Lusitania on its fateful final cruise in 1915 and by a 21st-century writer trying to unearth a family secret. The story toggles effortlessly between timelines, building romance and intrigue to a hellish climax at the Lusitania’s sinking—and to the completion of a book Sarah never intended to write 100 years later." They concluded by calling the novel "an unputdownable thriller."

Booklist's Melissa Norstedt called the novel "a riveting historical mystery."

Library Journal also reviewed the novel.
