= Her Last Flight =

2020 historical novel by Beatriz Williams

- Author: Beatriz Williams
- Genre: Historical fiction
- Publisher: William Morrow and Company
- Publication date: June 30, 2020
- ISBN: 9780062834782

Her Last Flight is a 2020 historical novel by Beatriz Williams.

== Reception ==
Her Last Flight was generally well received by critics, including a starred review from Publishers Weekly, who wrote, "Williams builds irresistible tension with the alternating timelines as the fate of Irene and Sam unfolds with shrewd twists and turns that build to an unexpected jolt. Williams's fans will devour this meaty tale."

Mike Farris, writing for The New York Journal of Books, wrote that Williams is "a master of the historical fiction genre," proven by this work, among her others. Farris explained, "Williams deftly weaves a story that spans multiple time periods and multiple points of view, with strategically placed surprises that readers will not soon forget." Farris concluded by saying, "Williams deftly fits together the characters, stories, and themes that the narrative services into a cohesive whole. The pieces all align perfectly, and she has shaped them together brilliantly. Her Last Flight is a gem of a book."

Kirkus Reviews provided a mixed review, calling Her Last Flight "an inventive if imperfect solution to a decades-old mystery." They explained, "Williams' otherwise imaginative novel front-loads a lot of exposition [...] The action is significantly slowed by technical details about surfing and flying that are sometimes engrossing but often gratuitous. Only halfway through does tension ramp up as Irene and Sam contemplate a future together and confront a giant impediment [...] Plenty of twists ensue, but by now readers may have lost patience. Williams has a fine ear for period-appropriate dialogue, leading us to wonder why there isn't more of it."
