= Carroll B. Williams Jr. =

African American forester and entomologist

Carroll Burns Williams Jr. (September 24, 1929 – March 1, 2024) was an American research forester and entomologist. He was the first African American scientist hired by the United States Forest Service and the first African American to receive a Ph.D. in forestry and entomology. He produced pioneering research on pesticide use in forests and insect-host relationships, including bark beetles, spruce budworms and other invasive species.

== Early life ==
Williams was born in St. Louis, Missouri in 1929. His father was an African American pharmacist and his mother was a physical education teacher of African American, Osage, and Kiowa heritage. During the Great Depression, Williams lived with his mother’s family in Leavenworth, Kansas. He often stayed with extended family, including uncles who had been Buffalo Soldiers. Later, Williams moved to Chicago, Illinois and attended Lindblom High School. He was initially denied admission to the University of Michigan School of Natural Resources, but appealed the decision after he discovered that a white student with lower grades had been accepted. He was subsequently admitted “with apologies.”

Williams' freshman year coincided with the start to the Korean War. He enlisted in the United States Marine Corps, becoming one of the first African American soldiers to serve in an integrated unit. He was promoted to the rank of Staff Sergeant and fought in the Battle for Outpost Vegas.

== Education ==
Williams was the first African American to receive a Ph.D. in forestry and entomology. He returned to University of Michigan using the G.I. Bill. In 1955, Williams completed his bachelors of science in forestry from University of Michigan, becoming the first African American student to graduate from Michigan’s School of Natural Resources. He earned a Master of Forestry in 1957 and Ph.D. in forestry with an emphasis in entomology and statistics in 1963 from Michigan. At college, Williams was elected to the student council and was a member of the Society of Les Voyageurs.

== Career and research ==
Williams worked as a forester and entomologist at various Forest Service research stations across the Pacific Northwest and Northeast. He is considered to have been an expert in large-scale chemical control operations and pilot tests for combatting pests. He specialized in pest management, insecticide field tests, and chemical control operations. His studies concerning spruce budworms contributed to the Environmental Protection Agency's approval of alternatives to DDT against the pest.

In 1968, Williams was assigned to New Haven, Connecticut to study the invasive bark beetle. While in New Haven, he joined the faculty of the Yale School of Forestry, serving as the first African American in the environmental sciences department.

In 1972, Williams moved to the Berkeley, California to design and conduct field tests of experimental insecticides against forest-defoliating insects. In 1975, the Forest Service named him a Pioneering Scientist. In 1985, he published a comprehensive guide to testing insecticides on coniferous forest pests. He went on to lead projects on integrated pest management principles in forest systems until his retirement from the Forest Service in 1988.

After leaving the Forest Service, Williams was appointed a senior lecturer in the Department of Forestry and Range Management at University of California, Berkeley. He served as the associate dean for Professional Degree Programs in the College of Natural Resources from 1995 to 1998 and led efforts to redevelop the forestry library into a Student Resource Center. He retired from UC Berkeley in 2003.

== Community work and activism ==
Williams was a member of minority recruitment programs at both Yale and UC Berkeley. In 1977, Williams was elected to the School Board of the Berkeley Unified School District. In 1979, he was unanimously elected to School Board President. He served as a member of the National Science Foundation, the Urban League Black Executives Exchange, and as a youth counselor for the NAACP.

== Legacy ==
In 2021, the University of Michigan School for Environment and Sustainability established the Dr. Carroll B. Williams Fund for Black Excellence. The fund is aimed at supporting students who have a degree from a Historically Black College or University.

In 2024, Ensemble Studio Theater commissioned a play about Williams’ career through the EST/Sloan Project Commission.

He was the father of three children, including screenwriter and author Maiya Williams.
