= Josephine Lawrence =

American storyteller, novelist and journalist (1889–1978)

Josephine Lawrence (1889–1978) was an American storyteller, novelist and journalist. Her works chronicled the lives of common people, with stories often filled with a large cast of bustling characters, emphasizing the everyday lives of children and the elderly.

== Literary career ==
Lawrence was among the many authors who ghost wrote series books for the Stratemeyer Literary Syndicate of children's books. She had interviewed Edward Stratemeyer in 1917, and he later invited her to write for his organization. She wrote 51 such volumes between 1920 and 1935, for series including Betty Gordon, Honey Bunch, Sunny boy " and the Riddle Club. After success writing for the Syndicate, she began writing her own series and stand-alone stories for children, including a radio series for children, ‘‘Man in the Moon,’’ which began broadcasting in October of 1921, and was the first book of stories read to children over the radio.

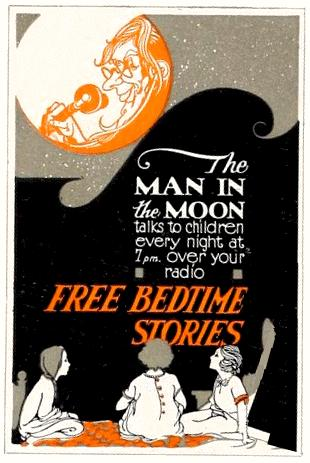
1922 Man in the Moon bedtime story poster

She later wrote novels for adults, including Glenna (1929), Head of the Family (1932), Years Are So Long (1934) — which was made into a movie Make Way for Tomorrow (1937) — If I Have Four Apples (1935), Sound of Running Feet (1937) and Bow Down to Wood and Stone (1938). Her novels covered the troubles of middle class people during the depression and were both critically praised and sold well at the time they came out, but have been less well known by 21st century readers. The New York Times noted that her novels detailed "money troubles and those family problems and relationships that in the 30s were most deeply felt." Two of her novels were Book-of-the-Month-Club selections: Years Are So Long and If I Have Four Apples. Her last published novel, Under One Roof, came out in 1975.

Years Are So Long is among a set of films from two eras in the 20th century that reflect cultural conflicts around aging and femininity that helped to reinforce elder advocacy in American social policy and legislation. The novel, described as “one of her more enduring works (out of approximately one hundred children's books and thirty-five social problem books for adults),” was treated to an annotated edition in 2012, A Critical Edition of Josephine Lawrence's "Years Are So Long" (1934): A Novelistic Portrayal of Adult Children with Their Elderly Parents during the American Great Depression.

In 1965, papers relating to her adult fiction were gathered in the Josephine Lawrence Collection at Boston University, in an archive containing letters, clippings, manuscripts of novels, poetry, and related materials. Correspondence concerning her juvenile fiction for Stratemeyer is held in the Stratemeyer Syndicate Records at the New York Public Library.

== Biography ==
Lawrence was born in Newark, New Jersey on March 12, 1889. By 1915, she was the editor of the children's page of the Newark Sunday Call, a weekly independent newspaper published from 1872 to 1946. By the 1920s, she was also the editor of the Household Page of that paper. In 1940 she married actor and tenor Artur Platz and moved to Manhattan. When the Newark Sunday Call closed down, she took a job at the Newark News where she wrote book reviews as well as a column titled “Book Marks.” Lawrence died at home in New York City on February 22, 1978 at age 88.
