= Schuyler Sisters (novel series) =

Novel series written by Beatriz Williams

- The Secret Life of Violet Grant; Tiny Little Thing; Along the Infinite Sea
- Author: Beatriz Williams
- Genre: Historical fiction
- Publisher: William Morrow and Company
- No. of books: 3

The Schuyler Sisters novel series written by Beatriz Williams consists of three books: The Secret Life of Violet Grant (2014), Tiny Little Thing (2015), and Along the Infinite Sea (2015).

== The Secret Life of Violet Grant (2014) ==
The Secret Life of Violet Grant was published May 27, 2014 by G. P. Putnam's Sons.

The novel was nominated for the 2014 Goodreads Choice Award for Historical Fiction.

The Secret Life of Violet Grant was generally well-received by critics.

Shelf Awareness's Elyse Dinh-McCrillis wrote, "Readers will be swept away to Europe on the brink of the First World War and 1960s New York City, and Vivian is the kind of sassy heroine Williams's fans have come to love. She throws snappy banter around the way Carole Lombard would in a classic movie. Violet is more innocent, but exhibits a strong will by crossing the Atlantic to study physics in London in 1911, blossoming when she meets her true love. The late plot twist provides a satisfying (if not entirely convincing) ending."

Kirkus Reviews provided a less positive review, stating that although Vivian and Violet "are interesting protagonists, readers will find Vivian’s wisecracking subterfuge annoying and question Violet’s naïve, subservient approach to her marriage, especially since she’s previously been presented as a strong, intelligent woman. Even readers interested in pure escapism will want to know why Vivian’s family wasn’t interested in discovering the complete truth about Violet’s fate prior to Vivian’s investigation. The underlying message is that money can’t buy happiness, especially when you’re living in a skin that no longer fits."

Booklist and Library Journal also reviewed the novel.

== Tiny Little Thing (2015) ==
Tiny Little Thing was published June 23, 2015 by G. P. Putnam's Sons.

Kirkus Reviews called Tiny Little Thing "a fascinating look at wealth, love, ambition, secrets, and what family members will and won’t do to protect each other." They also said the novel is "elegantly written" and "book is strewn with unexpected heroes and villains[...] mak[ing] an exclusive, Kennedy-esque world accessible. The underlying message is that money can’t buy happiness, especially when you’re living in a skin that no longer fits."

Katie Noah Gibson, writing for Shelf Awareness, called the novel "a deliciously scandalous and deeply moving story of one woman's quest to build a satisfying life." Gibson also praised Williams's writing style, highlighting her "elegant prose and diamond-edged dialogue."

Booklist also reviewed the novel.

== Along the Infinite Sea (2015) ==
Along the Infinite Sea was published November 3, 2015 by G. P. Putnam's Sons.

The final book of the series was well-received by critics, including starred reviews from Kirkus Reviews and Shelf Awareness, the former of which compared the story to The Sound of Music and Mad Men. Shelf Awareness's Jaclyn Fulwood called the novel "passionate and starry-eyed."

Booklist and Library Journal also reviewed the novel.
