= Ruth Fielding =

Ruth Fielding at Snow Camp, or, Lost in the backwoods. Published by Cupples & Leon, New York.

The Ruth Fielding books were an early Stratemeyer Syndicate series, published between 1913 and 1934 under the pseudonym Alice B. Emerson. Ruth Fielding begins the series as an orphan who comes to live with her miserly uncle and, in later titles, goes from boarding school to college and on into adulthood. Unusually for a main character in a Stratemeyer Syndicate series, Ruth Fielding marries.

== Ghostwriters ==
Edward Stratemeyer created the series and wrote plot outlines, but the books themselves were written by a number of ghostwriters. Three authors wrote the series under the pseudonym of Alice B. Emerson: W. Bert Foster wrote titles 1 through 19; Elizabeth M. Duffield Ward wrote titles 20 through 22; and Mildred A. Wirt Benson wrote titles 23 through 30.

== Titles ==
1. Ruth Fielding of the Red Mill; Or, Jasper Parloe's Secret, 1913
2. Ruth Fielding at Briarwood Hall; Or, Solving the Campus Mystery, 1913
3. Ruth Fielding at Snow Camp; Or, Lost in the Backwoods, 1913
4. Ruth Fielding at Lighthouse Point; Or, Nita, the Girl Castaway, 1913
5. Ruth Fielding at Silver Ranch; Or, Schoolgirls Among the Cowboys, 1913
6. Ruth Fielding on Cliff Island; Or, The Old Hunter's Treasure Box, 1915
7. Ruth Fielding at Sunrise Farm; Or, What Became of the Baby Orphans, 1915
8. Ruth Fielding and the Gypsies; Or, The Missing Pearl Necklace, 1915
9. Ruth Fielding in Moving Pictures; Or, Helping the Dormitory Fund, 1916
10. Ruth Fielding Down in Dixie; Or, Great Times in the Land of Cotton, 1916
11. Ruth Fielding at College; Or, The Missing Examination Papers, 1917
12. Ruth Fielding in the Saddle; Or, College Girls in the Land of Gold, 1917
13. Ruth Fielding in the Red Cross; Or, Doing Her Best for, Uncle Sam, 1918
14. Ruth Fielding at the War Front; Or, The Hunt for, The Lost Soldier, 1918
15. Ruth Fielding Homeward Bound; Or, A Red Cross Worker's Ocean Perils, 1919
16. Ruth Fielding Down East; Or, The Hermit of Beach Plum Point, 1920
17. Ruth Fielding in the Great Northwest; Or, The Indian Girl Star of the Movies, 1921
18. Ruth Fielding on the St. Lawrence; Or, The Queer Old Man of the Thousand Islands, 1922
19. Ruth Fielding Treasure Hunting; Or, A Moving Picture That Became Real, 1923
20. Ruth Fielding in the Far North; Or, The Lost Motion Picture Company, 1924
21. Ruth Fielding at Golden Pass; Or, The Perils of an Artificial Avalanche, 1925
22. Ruth Fielding in Alaska; Or, The Girl Miners of Snow Mountain, 1926
23. Ruth Fielding and Her Great Scenario; Or, Striving for, the Motion Picture Prize, 1927
24. Ruth Fielding at Cameron Hall; Or, A Mysterious Disappearance, 1928
25. Ruth Fielding Clearing Her Name; Or, The Rivals of Hollywood, 1929
26. Ruth Fielding in Talking Pictures; Or, The Prisoners of the Tower, 1930
27. Ruth Fielding and Baby June 1931
28. Ruth Fielding and Her Double, 1932
29. Ruth Fielding and Her Greatest Triumph; Or, Saving Her Company from Disaster, 1933
30. Ruth Fielding and Her Crowning Victory; Or, Winning Honors Abroad, 1934
