= The Golden Hour (Beatriz Williams novel) =

2019 historical fiction novel by Beatriz Williams

- Author: Beatriz Williams
- Genre: Historical fiction
- Publisher: William Morrow & Company
- Publication date: July 9, 2019
- ISBN: 9780062834751

The Golden Hour is a 2019 historical fiction novel by Beatriz Williams.

== Reception ==
The Golden Hour was well received by critics, including a starred review from Kirkus Reviews, who hailed it as "a fresh twist on the WWII love story, with a narrator who practically demands Myrna Loy come back to life to play her in the movie."

NPR's Denny S. Bryce called the novel "a refreshingly bittersweet read" that "brims with mystery and danger" and highlighted Williams's characters, saying they're "complex, daring and intriguingly human." While the novel included various historical homages, Bryce indicated feeling "a bit shortchanged at times" due to the lack of prominent figures such as the Duke and Duchess of Windsor. Despite wishing for these adjustments, Bryce concluded that the novel was like "fresh taffy. Warm, salty, a little bitter, and sweet — it pulls the reader in steadily without breaking apart."

Publishers Weekly started their review by highlighting how the main characters' stories, which take place in different decades and locations, "are cleverly intertwined." They concluded by writing, "Readers will appreciate the wartime espionage that keeps the suspense high."

In addition to comments similar to those in the reviews above, Booklist's Martha Waters noted that "the depiction of [...] postpartum depression is a particularly refreshing, albeit heart-wrenching, element of [the] story."

Library Journal's Jane Jorgenson noted that "the plotting is a bit of a slow burn," but "Williams's deft hand with characterization and emotionally connective storytelling pays off for readers in big ways."

St. Louis Post-Dispatch also reviewed The Golden Hour.
