= Golden Hours (magazine) =

American periodical for children

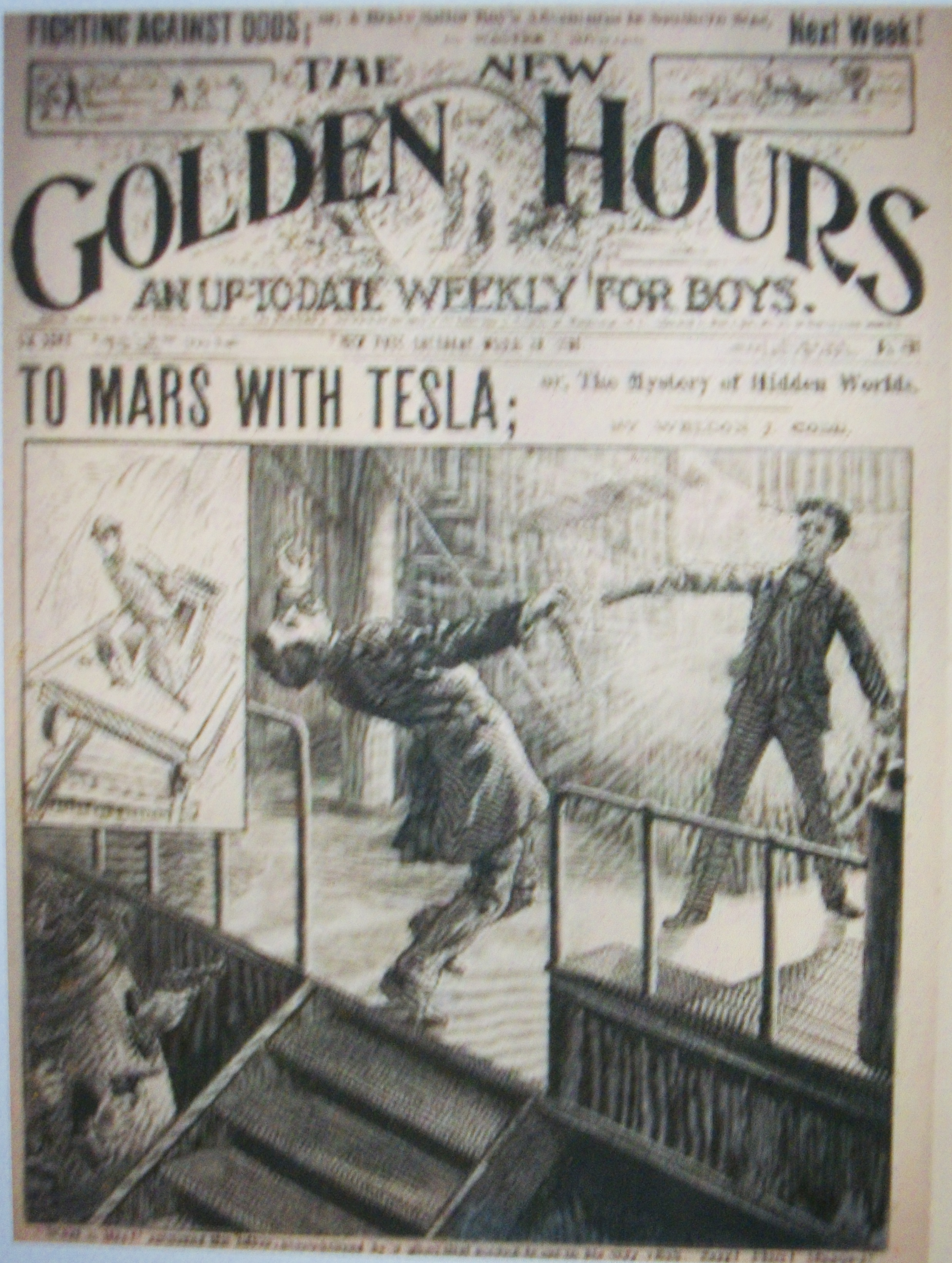
- Frequency: Weekly
- First issue: 1888; 138 years ago
- Final issue: 1904
- Country: United States
- Based in: New York City
- Language: English

Golden Hours was an American juvenile story paper printed from 1888 to 1904, with more than 800 weekly issues. The paper was based in New York City, and Norman Munro was the publisher. W. C. Dunn was editor for the periodical's first ten years.

In 1904 Golden Hours became a monthly family magazine, with "stories and matters of interest for all members of the family," for a subscription price of 25 cents a year.

== Content ==
Golden Hours printed adventure stories aimed to please boys. The April 27, 1889 issue contained a story entitled "The Adventures of Two Boys Among the Utes: A Stirring Story of Hunting and Indian Adventures." In 1898 the paper ran a fictionalized serial about the childhood of famous jockey Tod Sloan.

H. Irving Hancock produced more than 50 serials for this magazine between 1889 and 1904.

== Golden Hours Club ==
The publisher started the nationwide Golden Hours Club for the paper's readers, and membership reached 10,000. In 1889 2,000 children attended the first Convention of the Golden Hours Club in New York City. Entertainment included talks by writer Edward S. Ellis and circus owner P. T. Barnum. In 1891 the club's convention took place in Philadelphia, Pennsylvania, and editor W. C. Dunn gave a talk. During the convention the club's officers were chosen for the coming year.

== Another American Golden Hours periodical ==
From 1869 to 1880 a monthly magazine entitled Golden Hours: A Magazine for Boys and Girls was published by the Methodist Episcopal Church in Cincinnati, Ohio.
