= The Golden Hour (Maiya Williams novel) =

2004 children's novel by Maiya Williams

- Author: Maiya Williams
- Language: English
- Series: The Golden Hour
- Genre: Young adult; Adventure
- Publisher: Amulet Books
- Publication date: 2004
- Publication place: United States
- ISBN: 0-8109-4823-0
- OCLC: 53331592
- Dewey Decimal: [Fic] 22
- LC Class: PZ7.W66687 Go 2004
- Followed by: The Hour of the Cobra

The Golden Hour is a children's novel by Maiya Williams. It was first published in 2004 and is the first of the Golden Hour time travel series. It tells the story of Rowan Popplewell and his sister, Nina, who, while emotionally disturbed by the death of their mother, travel back in time to the French Revolution.

== Plot summary ==
The Golden Hour tells the story of Rowan and Nina's adventures the summer after their mother's death. Thirteen-year-old Rowan's life is at an all-time low: his father has turned to drinking, the family business is becoming a financial disaster, they have had to move from their house to a small apartment, and his musically talented ten-year-old sister Nina has become withdrawn. When his two great aunts invite Rowan and Nina to spend the summer with them in Owatannauk, Maine, a small (fictional) town on the tip of the state, Rowan anticipates a very boring summer with the two elderly women. But when he arrives he finds strange things starting to happen: the aunts run a curio shop stocking some items so curious they even compel Nina to start speaking again.

Rowan and Nina meet two twins, Xanthe and Xavier Alexander, who tell them about an old abandoned resort that appears to be haunted. Instead, the resort turns out to be an elaborate time machine. Nina seems interested in using the machine to escape her troubled life, especially when Rowan tells her about the Enlightenment, a period of European history when superstition and church dogma began giving way to logic and reason, art and science made tremendous strides, and truth and beauty were celebrated. When Nina disappears the next morning, the older kids rush to the resort: as they suspect, she has used the time machine. But Rowan discovers that he has told his sister the wrong dates for the Enlightenment, and instead of directing her to Enlightenment France he has sent her into the middle of the violent French Revolution. Rowan, Xanthe and Xavier time-travel to the French Revolution to save Nina, meeting various historical characters along the way, and Nina ends up in New York at their bakery visiting their mom.

== Characters ==
Rowan Popplewell
Rowan is a young man dealing with a great amount of stress. Because of his mother's death he has had to move with his father and sister to a small apartment where he has no room of his own. Before his mother died Rowan had many friends and a decent social life, but he now loses himself in video games to forget his problems. He describes himself as having a chest like a barrel, and being the kind of boy girls do not notice.

Nina Popplewell
Nina is Rowan's younger sister and, according to Rowan, "was a firecracker, always jumping with ideas." She has wild, uncontrollable black hair which tumbles over her shoulders and face. Nina is also a musical prodigy, able since the age of three to play tunes she had heard from the radio on the piano. After her mother's death, Nina "shut down". She stopped speaking and became dormant to the point of Rowan claiming that "I have no sister". It is also indicated from the text that she is highly intelligent.

Xanthe Alexander
Xanthe is described as having many shoulder-length braids and almond-shaped eyes. It is indicated that she is highly attractive. She is intrigued by native cultures, living close to the land, but also things that are mystical, symbolic and mysterious. She is homeschooled, because she and her brother are too intellectually gifted to be accommodated with the public school system. She is described as highly logical.

Xavier Alexander
Xavier is also described as attractive, and is a born liar. He remakes himself to suit whatever purpose is at hand, he loves to embellish the truth and he has an ego the size of a barn. Xavier also seeks freedom, independence and adventure, themes resonant with the spirit of the Gold Rush. He, like his sister, is homeschooled due to his advanced intelligence. He and Xanthe are fraternal twins, and he is the comedian of the two.

Agatha Drake
Agatha is a very short and plump woman who Rowan thinks resembles a pumpkin. She has light brown hair that is always messy, likes to dress in bright colors, and it is implied that she can read minds. Agatha lives with her friend Gertrude Pembroke in Owatannauk, Maine, where she uses The Owatannauk's alleviators (time machines) to travel through time collecting various items for her and Gertrude's curio shop. It is noted in the book that she enjoys word games like Scrabble. She is a nun.

Gertrude Pembroke
Gertrude is a tall and gaunt woman with a deep, melodic voice. She lives with her friend Agatha Drake in Owatannauk, Maine. She is not as outgoing as her friend Agatha Drake, and often described as humorless. She dresses in more somber colors than Agatha does. It is noted that she enjoys the game of chess.

Otto
Otto is the robot from the Owatannauk's alleviators (time machines)

== Publication history ==
- 2004, United States, Amulet Books, ISBN 0-8109-4823-0, Pub date 1 April 2004, hardcover
- 2006, United States, Harry N. Abrams Inc., ISBN 0-8109-9216-7, Pub date 1 April 2006, paperback
