= Sevish =

British electronic music composer

- Genres: Electronic music, experimental music
- Years active: 2005-present
- Website: sevish.com

Sean Archibald (born 1988), also known as Sevish, is a British electronic music composer from London. Described by Aaron Krister Johnson as "a well-known creative force in the world of online microtonal music", he is most known for his compositions which combine aspects of electronic dance music with microtonality. As a child, Archibald was inspired by music in video games such as Chrono Trigger, Streets of Rage, and Sonic the Hedgehog. He would then go on to discover microtonality as a teenager by listening to gamelan music and Aphex Twin. At age 16 he began officially releasing music online and released his first solo album at age 20. He first gained notoriety in the microtonal music scene with his 2010 release Golden Hour. Sevish's 2011 xenharmonic dance album, Subversio, created in collaboration with Tony Dubshot and Jacky Ligon, was described by Andrew Hugill as "dub meets microtonal tunings".

Since most instruments in the West are built to play the 12-tone equal tempered scale, Archibald turned to less common instruments and methods of composing microtonal music. He now uses an AXiS-49 hexagonal MIDI controller to play his microtonal music, along with various DAWs such as Ableton Live, Bitwig Studio (on a Linux system), and Max/MSP. The tuning systems he uses to create his music include 22-EDO, 15-EDO, 10-EDO, 13-limit just intonation, the Bohlen-Pierce scale, Pelog tuning, and many others. Adam Hart of the University of Salford said that his compositions "do not indicate a desire to move away from the archetypes of established EDM genres, but rather to explore alternative tunings through familiar stylistic approaches".

Archibald has expressed a desire to make microtonality more widely consumed by the public, creating multiple side projects to achieve this goal. He is the creator and host of Now&Xen, a podcast about microtonal music. In 2010 he founded his own record label, split-notes, which is focused on promoting music which uses microtonal scales, alternative tuning systems, and xenharmonics.

== Discography ==
Solo Work

- Sevish EP (2005)
- Crowded Images (2008)
- Exposure EP (2009)
- Golden Hour (2010)
- Human Astronomy (2010)
- Sean but not Heard (2012)
- day:dot EP (2013)
- Rhythm and Xen (2015)
- MK-SUPERDUPER (2016)
- Harmony Hacker (2017)
- Horixens (2019)
- Odds and Ends (2020)
- Bubble (2021)
- Formless Shadows (2021)
- Morphable (2022)
- Murmurations (2023)
- Big Sway (2023)
- One With the Fractal (2025)

Collaborations

- Crack My Pitch Up with 9 other artists (2010)
- Subversio with Tony Dubshot and Jacky Ligon (2011)
- 2MM2 (2 Minute Masterpieces 2) with 15 other artists (2013)
- 23 with Tony Dubshot and Jacky Ligon (2014)
- Next Xen with 18 other artists (2016)
- 3 Remixes with Acreil, Brendan Byrnes, and ZIA (2019)
- STAFFcirc vol. 7 - Terra Octava with 16 other artists (2021)
- Maglonia - Remix with M F TroniX (2022)
