= Vamoose (yacht) =

Fast steam yacht (1891)

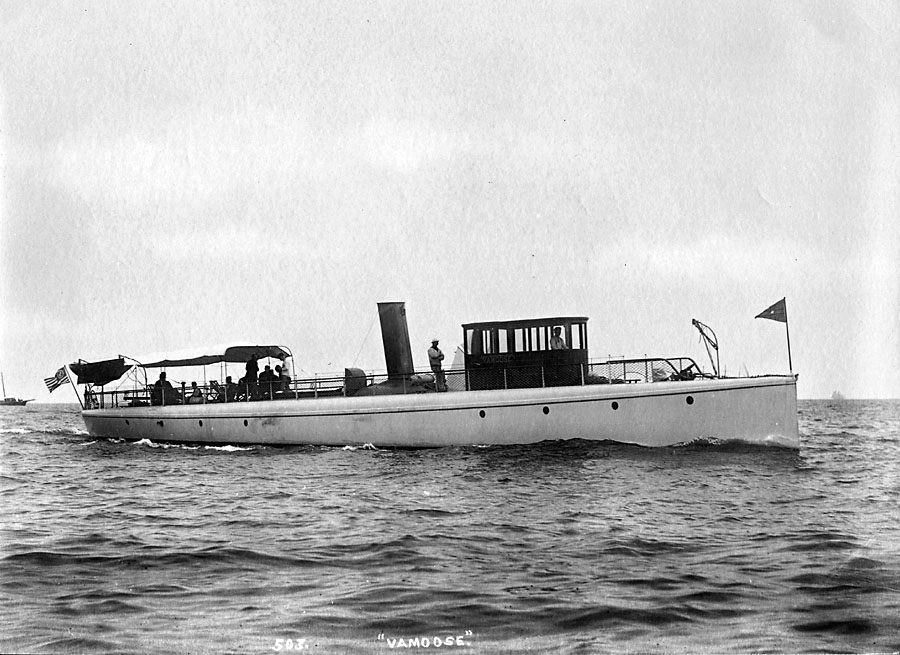
- Negative image of Vamoose taken in 1891

History
- Name: Vamoose
- Owner: William Randolph Hearst
- Ordered: Winter 1890
- Builder: Nathanael Greene Herreshoff
- Cost: $65,250 (equivalent to $2,338,125 in 2025)
- Yard number: 168
- Laid down: December 20, 1890
- Launched: August 29, 1891
- Completed: August 26, 1891
- Refit: April 1893
- Home port: New York City
- Fate: Unknown

General characteristics
- Class & type: coastal steamship
- Length: 112.5 feet (34.3 m)
- Beam: 13 feet (4.0 m)
- Draft: 4.9 feet (1.5 m)
- Installed power: 875 horsepower (652 kW) quadruple expansion steam engine with Thornycraft boiler (1891), converted to Sterling 4-cyl gas engine (1910)
- Propulsion: Single 57-inch (140 cm), three-bladed Zeise propeller
- Speed: 25.5 knots (47.2 km/h)
- Range: 2,800 nautical miles (3,200 mi)
- Crew: 10
- Notes: Steel-framed wooden hull

Vamoose was a fast steam-powered private yacht built for William Randolph Hearst by the Herreshoff Manufacturing Company. Designed by Nathanael Greene Herreshoff, she was based on an earlier torpedo boat commissioned by the United States Navy. At one point, Vamoose was claimed to be the fastest boat in the world, and her exploits drew attention from newspapers and yachting enthusiasts of the day. The majority of her life was spent in New York metropolitan area; as a member of the American Yacht Club, she participated in regattas as both a competitor and a press boat. In 1896, Vamoose was outfitted as a private dispatch boat for the New York Evening Journal to cover the Cuban War of Independence.

== Design and construction ==
Vamoose was commissioned from Herreshoff Manufacturing Company by a young William Randolph Hearst in the winter of 1890. Unlike many yachts of the Gilded Age which were built on a grand scale to luxurious standards (like SY Liberty, owned by Hearst's soon-to-be rival Joseph Pulitzer), Vamoose was designed for performance. Her purchase contract reportedly stipulated a minimum speed of 25 knots (46 km/h), with a bounty of $2,000 per excess half-knot attained.

In order to satisfy these requirements, lead engineer Nathaniel Herreshoff based the yacht on his earlier design for the U.S. Navy torpedo boat USS Cushing. The new project, known as hull number 168, would be 28 feet shorter and have one less engine & propeller than Cushing, but would also feature less than half the displacement of the warship. It retained a narrow beam to minimize drag and maximize hull speed. The ship also featured a wood hull framed by steel in order to balance weight with cabin temperature management. A single 875-horsepower quadruple-expansion steam engine was chosen as a powerplant. Thanks to these efforts, Vamoose was reportedly Herreshoff's fastest-yet design. During initial sea trials off Newport, Rhode Island she achieved an average speed of 25.5 knots (47.2 km/h).

== Delivery ==
At the time of Vamoose's commissioning, Hearst primarily resided in his native San Francisco and had yet to begin his East Coast media empire. The yacht's initial delivery was therefore accepted in New York (on August 29, by her chief engineer Theodore Heilbron) with the intention of relocating her to California soon after. Two plans were devised for the transcontinental journey: the first involved fitting her with masts and sailing around Cape Horn. The shorter alternative called for steaming to the Isthmus of Panama, then hauling-out and placing her on a specially designed crib spanning 3 rail cars for an overland crossing on the Panama Canal Railway (PCR) to the Pacific Ocean. The second plan was ultimately chosen, and multiple bridges over the rail line were even partially disassembled to accommodate the odd freight dimensions.

Upon reaching Panama, Vamoose was refused passage by railway superintendent Alfred Rives. Shortly beforehand, Hearst's San Francisco Examiner had reportedly published a poor review of his daughter Amélie Rives' book, and the refusal was interpreted as an act of retaliation. With no way to the Pacific, Vamoose returned to New York.

== Service life ==
=== Racing career ===
Shortly after her delivery in New York, Vamoose attracted media attention stemming from her high-profile ownership and high performance. The yacht's first exploits occurred in early September 1891 when she unofficially challenged the fast passenger steamer Mary Powell on the Hudson River. After losing an initial bout in unfavorable conditions, Vamoose would earn revenge a week later while she hosted Hearst and a number of guest journalists for a cruise around New York Harbor. After paying a visit to the White Squadron at anchor nearby, the crew spotted Mary Powell departing her berth at 22nd Street (now Chelsea Piers) laden with passengers—many of whom had booked passage just to see the rumored rematch. Vamoose promptly "ran circles" around the steamer (and even outran a northbound New York Central Railroad train).

==== Norwood rivalry ====
With news of her speed quickly making rounds, Hearst received a challenge from fellow publisher and yacht owner Norman Munro. Munro's steam yacht, Norwood, was not only an earlier Herreshoff design, but was also theorized to be the fastest boat in the world. In order to settle the debate, a race was proposed. By September 29, 1891, the challenge had grown into a highly publicized steam regatta proposed and sponsored by the American Yacht Club with a $500 cash prize (equivalent to $17,917 in 2025). In addition to Vamoose and Norwood, other potential participants were rumored to included USS Cushing, USS Stiletto, and several other private steam yachts. An initial date was set for October 3, 1891 and advertised in newspapers by the Iron Steamboat Company and Sandy Hook Line, who each sold spectator tickets to watch the event from their steamers. On the day of the race, Norwood ran aground on her way to the starting point due to the actions of an unqualified pilot. The mishap destroyed her propeller and initiated a series of postponements that would last years.

In the weeks following the failed meetup, each yacht conducted independent speed trials but no true consensus was achieved. After many months of delays attributed to poor weather and mechanical mishaps, the race ultimately failed to materialize. In September 1893, Munro purchased Vamoose from Hearst for $10,000 (equivalent to $358,333 in 2025) and vowed to race them against each other in order to "satisfy public curiosity," but his death in February 1894 apparently prevented that from happening.

=== Private use ===
On May 28, 1893, the yacht hosted President Grover Cleveland, Secretary of State Walter Gresham, Secretary of the Treasury John Carlisle, and Ambassador to Great Britain Thomas Bayard for an afternoon cruise on the Potomac River.

=== War of Cuban Independence ===
Vamoose gained international significance in October 1895, when the New-York Tribune published a "rumor" that Phoebe Hearst (mother of William Randolph) contributed $15,000 (equivalent to $580,500 in 2025) worth of aid toward the efforts of Cuban rebels seeking independence from Spain—including a refit of Vamoose for use as a dispatch boat and potential blockade runner. In 1896 she was engaged by The New York Journal and repositioned to Key West, Florida, where the paper intended to use her on frequent trips to Havana to gather correspondence from its sources in Cuba. As a fast, privately owned yacht, she would be free from interference by Spanish authorities, and could make the 87-mile (140 km) journey back to Key West in around four hours (whereafter breaking news could reach the paper's offices instantly by telegram).

On December 12, 1896, Vamoose's journey southward was delayed in Wilmington, North Carolina when the U.S. Treasury Department ordered her inspected on suspicion of arms trafficking. No contraband was found, and she was released that day.

== Ownership ==
Between her construction and last-recorded whereabouts, Vamoose changed ownership several times. Her final appearance in a published ship register was the 1917 edition of Lloyd's Register of American Yachts.

Vamoose ownership history
Year	Owner	Registered home port	Notes	Ref.
1891	William Randolph Hearst	San Francisco	Constructed 1891; interior refit April 1893	
1893	Norman Munro	New York City	Purchased autumn 1893	
1895	Frank T. Morrill	New York City		
1901	Howard Gould	New York City		
1903	Walter P. Lewisohn	New York City		
1911	J.D. Maxwell	Tarrytown, New York	Powerplant converted to Sterling 4-cylinder gasoline engine c.1910	
1914	Charles T. Wills	Greenwich, Connecticut		
1917	J.D. Mawell	Tarrytown, New York		
