= Henry Altemus Company =

- Status: Defunct
- Founded: 1842; 184 years ago
- Founder: Henry Altemus
- Defunct: 1936; 90 years ago
- Country of origin: United States
- Headquarters location: Philadelphia, Pennsylvania
- Publication types: Books

The Henry Altemus Company was a publishing company based in Philadelphia, Pennsylvania, for almost a century, from 1842 to 1936.

== History ==
The firm started as a bookbindery. In 1863, Altemus was awarded a patent for a particular type of binding for photographic albums. These albums were huge sellers for Altemus and were the mainstay of their publishing business until the mid-1880s. The albums were supplanted by Bibles in the 1880s. Starting in 1889, books were published with the Henry Altemus imprint. Like other publishers of its era, it published a wide variety of titles, in a wide variety of formats. The company published over two hundred series. These series can be seen listed at henryaltemus.com. More than 95% of all the published works of Henry Altemus were in series form.

Altemus' most popular series included the Young People's Library, Wee Books for Wee Folks, and their numerous juvenile series books. Among the latter are those written by H. Irving Hancock.
