= Betty Gordon =

Book series

The Betty Gordon books were an early Stratemeyer Syndicate series, published under the pseudonym Alice B. Emerson.

== Ghostwriters ==
Edward Stratemeyer created the series and wrote plot outlines for books by a number of ghostwriters. Josephine Lawrence wrote the first four volumes in the series, as well as volumes 7 and 9. Titles 5 and 6 were written by W. Bert Foster, number 8 by Elizabeth M. Duffield Ward and numbers 10 through 15 by Eunice W. Creager.

== Titles ==
1. Betty Gordon at Bramble Farm, or, The mystery of a nobody, 1920
2. Betty Gordon in Washington, or, Strange adventures in a great city, 1920
3. Betty Gordon in the Land of Oil, or, The farm that was worth a fortune, 1920
4. Betty Gordon at Boarding School, or, The treasure of Indian Chasm, 1921
5. Betty Gordon at Mountain Camp, or, The mystery of Ida Bellethorne, 1922
6. Betty Gordon at Ocean Park, or, School chums on the boardwalk, 1923
7. Betty Gordon and her School Chums; or, Bringing the rebels to terms, 1924
8. Betty Gordon at Rainbow Ranch; or, Cowboy Joe's secret, 1925
9. Betty Gordon in Mexican Wilds; or, The secret of the mountains, 1926
10. Betty Gordon and the Lost Pearls; or, A mystery of the seaside, 1927
11. Betty Gordon on the Campus; or, The secret of the trunk room, 1928
12. Betty Gordon and the Hale Twins; or, An exciting vacation, 1929
13. Betty Gordon at Mystery Farm; or, Strange doings at Rocky Ridge, 1930
14. Betty Gordon on No-trail Island; or, Uncovering a queer secret, 1931
15. Betty Gordon and the Mystery Girl; or, The secret at Sundown Hall, 1932
