= Beatriz Williams =

American historical fiction writer

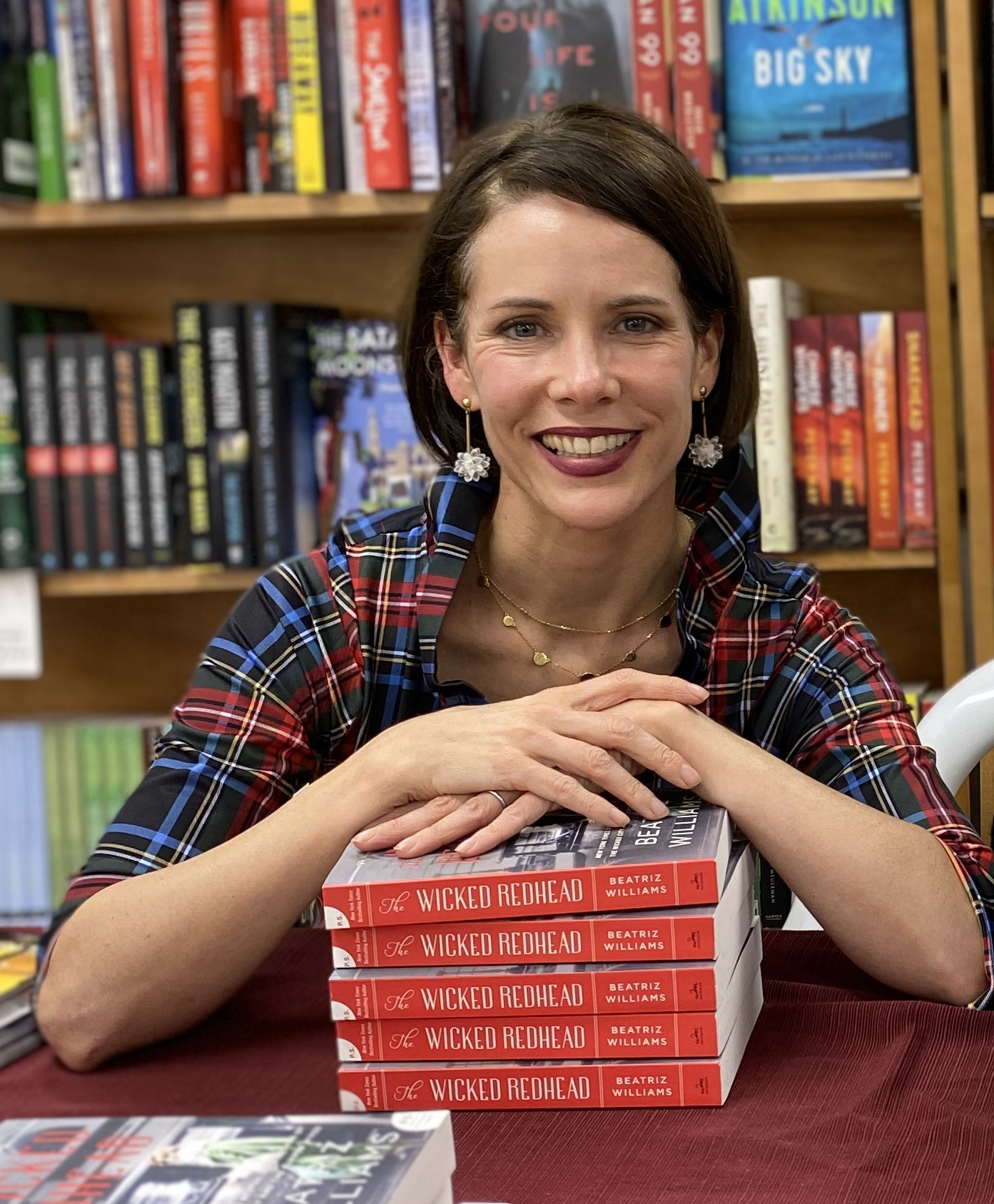
- Education: Stanford University; Columbia University
- Occupation: Writer
- Writing career
- Pen name: Juliana Gray
- Genre: Historical fiction
- Website: www.beatrizwilliams.com

Beatriz Williams, who also uses the pseudonym Juliana Gray, is an American historical fiction writer.

== Personal life and education ==
Williams graduated from Stanford University and has a Master of Business Administration from Columbia University.

She lives in Connecticut with her husband and four children.

== Awards and honors ==
Awards and honors for Williams's writing
Year	Title	Award	Result	Ref.
2013	A Hundred Summers	Goodreads Choice Award for Best Historical Fiction	Nominee	
2014	The Secret Life of Violet Grant	Goodreads Choice Award for Best Historical Fiction	Nominee	
2018	The Summer Wives	Goodreads Choice Award for Best Historical Fiction	Nominee	

== Publications ==
=== As Beatriz Williams ===
==== A Certain Age novels ====
1. A Certain Age. William Morrow and Company. 2016. ISBN 9780062404954.
2. Cocoa Beach. William Morrow and Company. 2017. ISBN 9780062405005.

==== Children's books ====
- Sight Word Surf: My Next 50 Words. 2023. ISBN 9798396629813.
- Sight Word Safari: My First 50 Sight Words. 2023. ISBN 9798395747297.

==== Anthology contributions ====
- Fall of Poppies: Stories of Love and the Great War. William Morrow and Company. 2016. ISBN 9780062418548.
- An American Airman in Paris: A Short Story from Fall of Poppies: Stories of Love and the Great War. William Morrow and Company. 2016. ISBN 9780062476586.

==== Co-authored novels ====
- Willig, Lauren; White, Karen (2016). The Forgotten Room. William Morrow and Company. ISBN 9780451474629.
- Willig, Lauren; White, Karen (2018). The Glass Ocean. William Morrow and Company. ISBN 9780062642479.
- Willig, Lauren; White, Karen (2020). All the Ways We Said Goodbye. William Morrow and Company. ISBN 9780062931092.
- Willig, Lauren; White, Karen (2022). The Lost Summers of Newport. William Morrow and Company. ISBN 9780063040748.

==== Schuyler Sisters novels ====
1. The Secret Life of Violet Grant. G.P. Putnam's Sons. 2014. ISBN 9780399162176.
2. Tiny Little Thing. G.P. Putnam's Sons. 2015. ISBN 9780399171307.
3. Along the Infinite Sea. G.P. Putnam's Sons. 2015. ISBN 9780399171314.

==== Standalone novels ====
- Overseas. G. P. Putnam's Sons. 2012. ISBN 9780399157646.
- A Hundred Summers. G. P. Putnam's Sons. 2013. ISBN 9780399162169.
- The Summer Wives. William Morrow and Company. 2018. ISBN 9780062660343.
- The Golden Hour. William Morrow and Company. 2019. ISBN 9780062834751.
- Her Last Flight. William Morrow and Company. 2020. ISBN 978-0-06-283478-2.
- Our Woman in Moscow. William Morrow and Company. 2021. ISBN 978-0-06-302078-8.
- The Beach at Summerly. William Morrow and Company. 2023. ISBN 978-0-06-302078-8.
- Williams, Beatriz (2024-06-25). Husbands & Lovers. New York: Ballantine Books. ISBN 978-0-593-72422-4.

==== The Wicked City series ====
1. The Wicked City. William Morrow and Company. 2017. ISBN 9780062405036.
2. The Wicked Redhead. William Morrow and Company. 2019. ISBN 9780062660329.
3. The Wicked Widow. William Morrow and Company. 2021. ISBN 9780063142442.

=== As Juliana Gray ===
==== Affairs by Moonlight series ====
1. A Lady Never Lies. Berkley Sensation. 2012. ISBN 9780425250921.
2. A Gentleman Never Tells. Berkley Sensation. 2012. ISBN 9780425251072.
3. A Duke Never Yields. Berkley Sensation. 2013. ISBN 9780425251188.

==== Emmeline Truelove series ====
1. The Duke of Olympia Meets His Match. InterMix. 2016.
2. A Most Extraordinary Pursuit. Berkley Books. 2016. ISBN 9780425277072.
3. A Strange Scottish Shore. Berkley Books. 2017. ISBN 9780425277089.

==== A Princess In Hiding series ====
1. How to Tame Your Duke. Berkley Sensation. 2013. ISBN 9780425265666.
2. How to Master Your Marquis. Berkley Sensation. 2014. ISBN 9780425265673.
3. How to School Your Scoundrel. Berkley Sensation. 2014. ISBN 9780425265680.
