= Cornelius (name) =

- Gender: Male
- Language: European

Other gender
- Feminine: Cornelia

Origin
- Language: Latin
- Origin: Cornēlius (Latin)
- Meaning: Unknown
- Region of origin: Europe

Other names
- Nicknames: Cor, Corrie, Con, Connie
- Related names: Cornelis, Cornelio, Corneliu

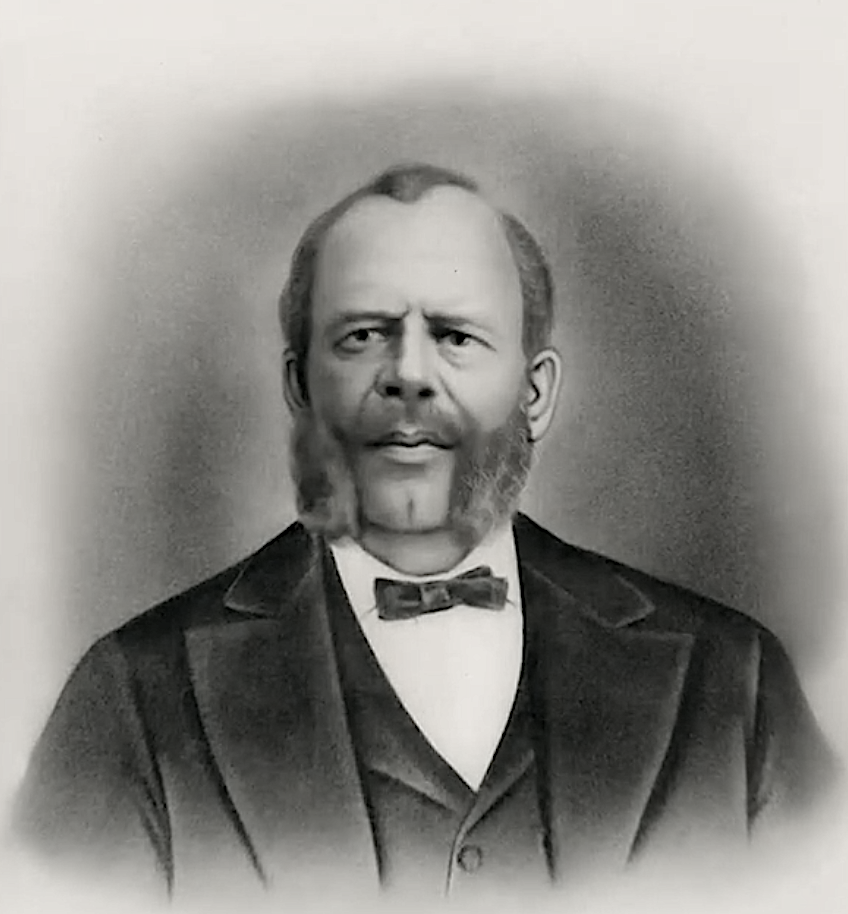
Cornelius Moses Butler

Cornelius is an originally Roman masculine name. Its derivation is uncertain but is suspected to be from the Latin cornu, "horn". In Ireland it was used as an anglicization of the name Connor.

== Cornelius as a surname ==
- Aaron Cornelius (born 1990), Australian rules footballer
- Ajani Cornelius (born 2002), American football player
- Alvin Robert Cornelius (1903–1991), Pakistani jurist and politician
- Andreas Cornelius (born 1993), Danish footballer
- Bernard Cornelius (1919–1987), English cricketer
- Billy Cornelius (1898–?), English footballer
- Carter Cornelius (1948–1991), American politician
- Charles Cornelius (born 1945), Indian field hockey player
- Charles Cornelius (gridiron football) (born 1952), American football player
- Cleighten Cornelius (born 1976), New Zealand cricketer
- Dean Cornelius (born 2001), Scottish footballer
- Deborah Cornelius, British actress
- Derek Cornelius (born 1997), Canadian soccer player
- Don Cornelius (1936–2012), the creator and first host of Soul Train
- Eddie Cornelius, American gospel singer
- Elias Cornelius (1794–1832), American missionary
- Everton Cornelius (born 1955), Antigua and Barbuda sprinter
- George Cornelius (Secretary), American politician
- Godwin Shane Cornelius (1970 - ) Medical Doctor.
- Hans Cornelius (1863–1947), German philosopher
- Helen Cornelius (1941–2025), American singer-songwriter and actress
- Ingeborg Cornelius (1930–2023), Austrian actress
- Jacob Cornelius (born 1984), American rower
- Jemalle Cornelius (born 1984), American football player
- Johanna Cornelius (1912–1974), Afrikaner activist and trade unionist
- Kathy Cornelius (born 1932), American golfer
- Keenan Cornelius (born 1992), American Brazilian Jiu-Jitsu and MMA fighter
- Keithroy Cornelius (born 1968), U.S. Virgin Islands cricketer and footballer
- Laura Cornelius (born 1996), Dutch basketball player
- Lloyd Cornelius (born 1943), Guyanese cricketer
- Michael G. Cornelius, American academic and author
- Nelarine Cornelius (born 1957), British academic
- Norman Cornelius (1886–1963), English cricketer
- Patricia Cornelius (born 1952), Australian playwright
- Peter Cornelius (disambiguation), multiple people
- Reid Cornelius (born 1970), American baseball player and coach
- Robert Cornelius (1809–1893), American photographer
- Stan Cornelius (1941–2005), American lawyer, politician and record producer
- Stella Cornelius (1919–2010), Australian businesswoman and peace activist
- Taylor Cornelius (born 1995), American football player
- Thomas R. Cornelius (1827–1899), American politician
- Tiffany Cornelius (born 1989), Luxembourgish tennis player
- Troy Cornelius (born 1983), Guyanese cricketer
- Wade Cornelius (born 1978), New Zealand cricketer
- Wanda Cornelius, American politician
- Wayne A. Cornelius (born 1945), American political scientist and academic

== Cornelius as a given name ==
- Cornelius (musician), stage name of Japanese recording artist and producer Keigo Oyamada
- Corneille (singer), stage name of Cornelius Nyungura, German-born Québécois rhythm and blues singer
- Cornelius Agrippa, 15th-century German magician and cabalist
- Cornelius W. Armstrong (1827–after 1872), New York politician
- Cornelius Bennett, American football player
- Cornelius Boza-Edwards, Ugandan Super Featherweight boxing champion
- Cornelius M. Brosnan (1813–1867), Justice of the Supreme Court of Nevada
- Cornelius Burger, South African serial killer
- Cornelius Burges, English minister
- Cornelius Cardew, English composer
- Cornelius the Centurion, considered by Christians to be the first Gentile converted
- Cornelius Castoriadis, Greek-French astronomer, philosopher
- Cornelius Crane Chase, better known under his stage name Chevy Chase, actor and comedian
- Cornelius Coe, American football player
- Cornelius Cole, Governor of California
- Cornelius P. Comegys, American farmer and politician
- Cornelius Fuscus, prefect of the Praetorian Guard
- Cornelius Edward Gallagher (1921–2018), American politician
- Sir Cornelius Greenfield (born 1909), Rhodesian civil servant
- Cornelius Hankins (1863–1946), American painter
- Cornelius Hardy, Australian convict
- Cornelius Henry, Canadian cricketer
- Cornelius T. Herring (1849–1931), American rancher, banker and hotelier
- Cornelius Hill (1834–1907), Oneida leader
- Cornelius Holland (regicide), regicide of Charles I of England
- Cornelius Holland (politician), United States Representative from Maine
- Cornelius Holmboe (1881–1947), Norwegian politician
- Cornelius Jakhelln, Norwegian musician
- Cornelius Johnson (athlete), African-American high jump athlete
- Cornelius L. Keedy, American pastor, physician, and academic administrator
- Cornelius Lanczos, Hungarian mathematician and physicist
- Cornelius Lysaght, horse racing correspondent
- Cornelius McGillicuddy Sr., better known as Connie Mack, baseball player, Philadelphia Athletics owner and manager
- Cornelius Harvey McGillicuddy III, better known as Connie Mack III, senator from Florida
- Cornelius Harvey McGillicuddy IV, better known as Connie Mack IV, congressman from Florida
- Cornelius Mwalwanda (died 2020), Malawian politician and economist
- Cornelius Nepos, Roman historian of Gaul
- Cornelius S. Palmer (1844–1932), American soldier, lawyer, and judge
- Cornelius Pot, Dutch football coach
- Cornelius Roosevelt (1794–1871), American businessman
- Cornelius V. S. Roosevelt (1915–1991), American veteran
- Cornelius Ryan (1920–1974), author of The Longest Day and A Bridge Too Far
- Cornelio Saavedra, first President of Argentina 1810
- Cornelius Calvin Sale Jr., birth name of Robert Byrd, senator and congressman from West Virginia
- Cornelius "Corrie" Sanders, South African boxer
- Cornelius Sherlock (died 1888), British architect
- Cornelius Staley (1808–1883), American politician from Maryland
- Cornelius Van Til, Dutch-American Christian philosopher, Reformed theologian, and presuppositional apologist
- Cornelius Vander Starr, American founder of AIG
- Cornelius Vanderbilt, American industrialist
- Cornelius Wiebe, Canadian physician and politician
- Cornelius Whitehouse (1796–1883), English engineer and inventor
- Pope Cornelius, pope from AD 251 to 253
- Metropolitan Cornelius, several people
- St. Cornelius (disambiguation), several saints
- Cornelius Adam Igbudu (1914–1981), founder of the Anglican Adam Preaching Society

== Fictional characters ==
=== Family name ===
- Abraham Cornelius, scientist in X-Men comics
- Doctor Cornelius, in C. S. Lewis's novel Prince Caspian
- Jerry Cornelius, in books by Michael Moorcock
- Yukon Cornelius, in Rudolph the Red-Nosed Reindeer (TV special)
- Cornelius, play by John Boynton Priestley
- Father Vito Cornelius, a priest in The Fifth Element movie

=== Given name ===
- Cornelius (Planet of the Apes), from the Planet of the Apes film series
- Cornelius, an old elephant counsellor from the Babar the Elephant children's books and animated TV series
- Prince Cornelius, faery prince from the 1994 film Thumbelina
- Cornelius, an alias used by The Narrator in Fight Club
- Cornelius Coot, in the Scrooge McDuck universe
- Cornelius Fillmore, in the animated series Fillmore!
- Cornelius Fudge, from the Harry Potter series
- Gibby Cornelius Gibson, one of the main characters of Nickelodeon's iCarly
- Cornelius Hackl from the musical Hello, Dolly!
- Cornelius "Cory" Matthews, the main character of Boy Meets World
- Lewis "Cornelius" Robinson, the adult character of Lewis in Meet the Robinsons
- Cornelius Stirk, in the DC Universe
- Cornelius Austerlin, the stepdad in Lene Kaaberbøl's books about Katriona
- Cornelius, an elderly ant in the 1998 film A Bug's Life

== See also ==
- Cornelia (name), the feminine version of the name
- Cornelis, a Dutch version of the name
- Cornelius (disambiguation), for other meanings
