= Corrie (given name) =

- Gender: Unisex
- Language: English, Dutch

Origin
- Languages: Latin, English
- Origin: 1. Cornelius; 2. Cornelia
- Region of origin: Europe

Other names
- Variant form: Corry
- Related names: Cornelia, Cornelius, Cornelis, Cornélie, Cornelio, Corneliu, Cornell, Cornel, Corwin, Coriona, Corris, Cortez, Coralie, Coral, Coraline, Cormac, Cora, Courtland, Cortland, Cortlandt, Courtney, Corina, Corinna, Corinne

Corrie or Corry is a given name, often a diminutive, short form of Cornelia or Cornelius.

Notable people with the given name include:

== Feminine ==
- Corrie Bakker (born 1945), Dutch sprinter ("Cornelia")
- Corrie Boellaard (1869–1934), Dutch painter and graphic artist ("Cornelia")
- Corry Brokken (1932–2016), Dutch singer ("Cornelia")
- Corrie Cameron (1904–1993), New Zealand printmaker and watercolorist ("Coralie")
- Corrie Chen, Taiwanese-Australian filmmaker, writer, and director
- Corrie Clark (born 1982), American swimmer
- Corrie Corfield (born 1961), English newsreader for BBC Radio 4 ("Coriona")
- Corrie de Bruin (born 1976), Dutch discus thrower and shot putter
- Corrie de Roos-Oudegeest (1899–1998), Dutch politician
- Corry Gallas (1885–1967), Dutch painter ("Cornelia")
- Corrie Hartong (1906–1991), Dutch dancer, dance teacher and choreographer ("Cornelia")
- Corrie Hermann (born 1932), Dutch GreenLeft politician ("Cornelia")
- Corry Kawilarang (born 1935), Indonesian badminton player
- Corrie Laddé (1915–1996), Dutch swimmer ("Cornelia")
- Corrie Lothrop (born 1992), American gymnast
- Corrie Moreau (born c. 1978), American evolutionary biologist and entomologist
- Corrie Pabst (1865–1943), Dutch artist ("Cornelia")
- Corrie Schimmel (born 1939), Dutch swimmer ("Cornelia")
- Corry Schiermeyer (born 1970), American politician
- Corrie Scott (born 1993), Scottish swimmer
- Corrie Stein (born 1940), Dutch-born politician in Jersey
- Corry Tendeloo (1897–1956), Dutch lawyer, feminist, and politician ("Cornélie")
- Corrie ten Boom (1892–1983), Dutch Holocaust survivor who helped many Jews escape ("Cornelia")
- Corry Vreeken (born 1928), Dutch chess master ("Cornelia")
- Corrie Vellekoop (born 1935), Australian-Dutch sociologist
- Corrie van Brenk (born 1960), Dutch politician
- Corrie van Gorp (1942–2020), Dutch actress and singer ("Cornelia")
- Corry van Zanten (1855–1946), Dutch opera singer, singing teacher and author ("Cornélie")
- Corrie Winkel (born 1944), Dutch swimmer ("Kornelia")

== Masculine ==
- Corrie Artman (1907–1970), American football player ("Corwin")
- Corrie Barrett (born 1998), Irish rugby union player
- Corry Bliss (born 1981), American politician ("Corwin")
- Corrie Block (born 1975), Canadian executive coach
- Corrie Brown (1949–2007), British bobsledder
- Corrie D'Alessio (born 1969), Canadian ice hockey goaltender
- Corrie Denison, pseudonym of Eric Partridge (1894–1979), New Zealand–British writer and lexicographer
- Corrie Dick (born 1990), British musician
- Corry Evans (born 1990), Northern Irish footballer
- Corrie Gardner (1879–1960), Australian long-jumper, hurdler and Australian rules football player ("Corris")
- Corrie Grant (1850–1924), British journalist, barrister and Liberal Party politician
- Corrie McKeague (born 1993), British RAF gunner who disappeared in 2016
- Corrie Ndaba (born 1999), Irish professional footballer
- Corrie Sanders (1966–2012), South African boxer ("Cornelius")
- Corrie van Zyl (born 1961), South African cricketer ("Cornelius")

== See also ==
- Corie, given name
- Cory, given and last name
- Corey, given and last name
- Cor (given name)
