= Cornelius =

Cornelius may refer to:

== People ==
- Cornelius (name), Roman family name and a masculine given name
- Cornelius the Centurion, Roman centurion considered by Christians to be the first Gentile to convert to the Christian faith
- Pope Cornelius, pope from AD 251 to 253
- St. Cornelius (disambiguation), multiple saints
- Cornelius (musician), stage name of Keigo Oyamada
- Metropolitan Cornelius (disambiguation), several people

== Places in the United States ==
- Cornelius, Indiana
- Cornelius, Kentucky
- Cornelius, North Carolina
- Cornelius, Oregon

== Other uses ==
- Cornelius keg, a metal container originally used by the soft drink industry
- Adam E. Cornelius (ship, 1973), a lake freighter built for the American Steamship Company
- Cornelius, a play by John Boynton Priestley
- Cornelius (Planet of the Apes), one of the principle characters from the Planet of the Apes franchise, portrayed by Roddy McDowell

== See also ==
- Cornelius House (disambiguation)
- Cornelia (disambiguation)
- Corneliu (disambiguation)
- Cornelis (disambiguation)
