= Cor =

Cor or COR may refer to:

== People ==
- Cor people, an ethnic group of Vietnam
- Cor (given name), including a list of people with the name
- Jon Cor (born 1984), a Canadian actor

== Places ==
- Cor, Templeport, a townland in County Cavan, Ireland
- California State Prison, Corcoran, Kings County, California, U.S.
- Ingeniero Aeronáutico Ambrosio L.V. Taravella International Airport, Córdoba, Argentina, IATA airport code COR
- Corby railway station, UK, station code COR
- Corio railway station, Victoria, Australia, station code COR
- County Cork, Ireland, Chapman code COR

== Business and organizations ==
- College of Radiographers (CoR), a charitable subsidiary of the Society of Radiographers
- Committee of the Regions (CoR), the European Union's assembly of local and regional representatives
- Commonwealth Oil Refineries, an Australian oil company 1920–1952
- Confederation of Regions Party of Canada (CoR), Canadian political party
- Contracting Officer's Technical Representative, or Contracting Officer's Representative, in U.S. government procurement
- Kashruth Council of Canada, known as COR, a Canadian kosher certification agency
- Championship Off-Road (COR), an American off-road racing series

== Languages ==
- Cor, a dialect of Cua language (Austroasiatic)
- Cornish language, ISO 639-2/3 language code cor

== Music ==
- Cor, the French word for Horn, a musical instrument, often a French horn
  - Cor anglais (English Horn), a woodwind instrument
- Cor (album), by Brazilian duo Anavitória
- Cor Scorpii, Norwegian metal band
- Côr Cymru, Welsh choir competition

== Science and technology ==
- Coefficient of restitution, the ratio of the final to initial relative velocity between two objects after they collide
- Coronatine, a toxin

== Other uses ==
- Chamber of Reflection, a Masonic initiation space
- COR, IOC country code for a unified Korea Team
- cor, a "Technical Corrigendum" for ISO standards, see International Organization for Standardization
- Cor!!, a British comic book
- Comando per le Operazioni in Rete, Italian cyberwarfare military unit

== See also ==
- Cor blimey (disambiguation)
- Cor Jesu (disambiguation)
- Epistles to the Corinthians (disambiguation)
- Cor bovinum and Cor triatriatum, heart disease and defect
- Cor Caroli and Cor Hydrae, stars
- Cor Serpentis, 1958 science fiction short story
- Pontifical Council Cor Unum, former Roman Catholic organisation
- Heart-nosed bat, Cardioderma cor
