= Coral (given name) =

Female given name

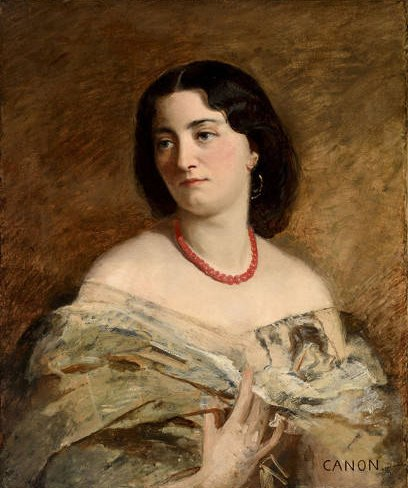
- Portrait of a Woman with Coral Beads by Hans Canon.
- Gender: Female

Origin
- Origin: Greek
- Meaning: Coral

Other names
- Related names: Coralie, Coraline

Coral is a feminine given name derived from the precious coral used to make jewelry. The name is ultimately derived from the Greek word korallion and the Latin coralium.

The name came into fashion in the Anglosphere in the late 1800s along with other gemstone names for girls. Coral necklaces were traditionally worn by young children to protect them from illness.

== Usage ==
The name was at the height of popularity in most English-speaking countries in the late 1800s and the first half of the 20th century. Its greatest popularity in Spain was between 1980 and 2010. The name has since declined in popularity but remains in regular use. In the United States, 128 newborn girls were named Coral in 2021. Name variants Coralie and Coraline are also in regular use for girls.

== Notable people ==
- Coral Aguirre, pen name of Argentinean-born playwright, musician, and professor of literature Angélica Claro Canteros (born 1938)
- Coral Amiga, English actress
- Coral Atkins (1936–2016), English actress who opened and ran a home for disadvantaged children
- Coral Barbas, Spanish academic who is a professor at the Universidad CEU San Pablo in Madrid, Spain and is known for her research on metabolomics and integration of chemical data
- Coral Bell (1923–2012), Australian academic who wrote about international relations and power politics
- Coral Bentley (born 1984), retired Australian synchronized swimmer who competed in the 2008 Summer Olympics
- Coral Bistuer (born 1966), Spanish taekwondo practitioner
- Coral Bracho (born 1951), Mexican poet, translator, and doctor of Literature
- Coral Browne (1913–1991), Australian-American stage and screen actress
- Coral Buttsworth (1900–1985), Australian tennis player
- Coral Casado Ortiz (born 1996), Spanish professional racing cyclist
- Coral Drouyn (born 1945), English-Australian actress, singer, and screenwriter/story editor
- Coral Egan, Canadian jazz and pop singer
- Coral-Jade Haines (born 1996), English women's footballer
- Coral Herrera (born 1977), Spanish feminist writer and communicator based in Costa Rica, known for her critique of the concept of romantic love and her contributions to queer studies
- Coral Hull (born 1965), Australian author, poet, artist, and photographer
- Coral Lansbury (1929–1991), Australian-born feminist writer and academic
- Coral Palmer (born 1942), former New Zealand netball player and coach
- Coral Petkovich, Australian writer and translator
- Coral Bernadine Pollard (born circa 1940), Barbadian artist
- Coral Short (born 1973), queer Canadian multimedia artist and coordinator
- Coral Smith (born 1979), American former reality television personality
- Coral Taylor (born 1961), Australian female rally co-driver
- Coral Wong Pietsch (born 1947), American lawyer who serves as a judge of the United States Court of Appeals for Veteran Claims

== Fictional characters ==
- Coral in Finding Nemo
- Coral in Faerie Tale Theatre's The Little Mermaid
- Coral in Saban's Adventures of the Little Mermaid
- Coral in The Chronicles of Amber
- Coral in Cocktail
- Coral in Losing Gemma
- Coral in South Sea Sinner
- Coral in Dead Ringers
- Coral in Sea Wees
- Coral in Business with Friends
- Coral in The Power and the Glory
- Coral in Permissive
- Coral in Studio One
- Coral in Marvin's Room
- Coral in Taxi
- Coral in Armchair Theatre
- Coral in Marshall Law
- Coral in Killer Net
- Coral in Strong Medicine
- Coral in My Favorite Martians
- Coral in The Magic Roundabout
- Coral in Water Rats
- Coral in Mercy Peak
- Coral in Blue Bayou
- Coral in The Wedding Video
- Coral in Within These Walls
- Coral in Assault on Precinct 13
- Coral in Jonathan Creek
- Coral in La Mariée était en noir
- Coral in L'Amour
- Coral in Gotita de amor
- Coral in El Deseo
- Coral in Corazones al límite
- Coral Fabre in Profundo carmesí
- Coral Labrada in En carne propia
- Coral Mermaid in Amy, la niña de la mochila azul
- Coral Machado in Todo por tu amor
- Coral Sea Shells in Lalaloopsy
- Coral Torress Olavaria in Ser bonita no basta
- Coral Davis in Malpractice
- Coral Stacey in Family Affairs
- Coral Oates in Class Act
- Coral Manning in Ground Control: Dark Conspiracy
- Coral O'Connor in Echo Point
- Coral Harland in Mountain Justice
- Coral Careen in Dr. Heckyl and Mr. Hype
- Coral Garrett in Holby City
- Coral Bloom in Shortland Street
- Coral Richardson in All Saints
- Coral Lambert in Prisoner
- Coral Whitman in Baywatch
- Coral Ward in Sons and Daughters
- Coral Grable in Animal Behavior
- Coral Kiss in SeaChange
- Coral Wilson in The Force
- Coral Hoople in Common Law Cabin
- Coral Trollarwise in Trollz
- Coral Lasonne in Crossroads
- Coral Mills in The Hughleys
- Coral Mayberry in Lou Grant
- Coral Prescott in "Flashpoint", a 1966 episode of the Australian TV series Homicide
- Coral Musker in Orient Express
- Coral Galvins in Law & Order
- Coral Watson in Ironside
- Coral King in Home and Away
- Coral Lips in Arabian Nights (2000)
- Miss Coral in I Never Promised You A Rose Garden
- Coral-Ann in The Troubleshooters
- Cure Coral (a.k.a. Sango Suzumura) in Tropical-Rouge! Pretty Cure

== See also ==
- Almog (surname)
