= George Cornelius =

George Cornelius may refer to:

- George Cornelius (Secretary), former Secretary of the Pennsylvania Department of Community and Economic Development
- George Cornelius (footballer) (1874–1966), Australian rules footballer
- George Cornelious, bishop of the diocese of Krishna-Godavari of the Church of South India

== See also ==
- George Cornelius Gorham (1787–1857), vicar in the Church of England
