= Vidal Medina =

Mexican playwright and theatre director (born 1976)

Vidal Medina (born in 1976) is a Mexican playwright and theatre director.

== Biography ==
Medina was born in 1976 in Reynosa, Tamaulipas. He graduated from the Universidad Autónoma de Nuevo León (UANL) in Administration, and studied in music at the Monterrey School of Music and Dancey. In 1994, he founded the Bocazas Grises literary workshop, and joined a theatrical workshop at the UANL School of Theater of the Faculty of Philosophy and Literature in 1999. In 2006–07, he studied in the Diplomado Nacional de Dramaturgia Conaculta-Inba.

He is currently writing at the International Play Development of the London Royal Court Theater. He is affiliated with the Teatro de los Peripatéticos A.C.

== Published works ==
- Garap, Conarte-Conaculta, ed. 2002. Won the Nuevo León Literature Prize, 2001.
- Sitios concurridos, trazos y la danza del zombie (Antología: Contraseña: Nueva Dramaturgia Regiomontana, Conarte-Conaculta, ed. 2003).
- Vuelve a casa (Return Home) Microdrama. Posdata Magazine Ed. 2005)
- Galimatías (Tramoya Magazine no. 91. Veracruzana University- UANL. Ed. 2007).
- Reseña: Garap, de Vidal Medina, Nuevo León State Fund for Culture and Arts, by Salvador Ramírez. Paso de Gato Año 3 Magazine, no. 16–17. April–June 2004.
- Prácticas Posmodernas en la dramaturgia mexicana de los noventa (Postmodern Practice in 1990s Mexican Drama) (David Olguín, Luis Mario Moncada, Gerardo Mancebo, Vidal Medina) by Elvira Popova. Armas y Letras Magazine (Universidad Autónoma de Nuevo León) No. 56. September 2006.

== Premieres ==
- Sitios concurridos, under the author's direction. Fuenteovejun-teatro bar, October 2003 – May 2004.
- Garap, directed by Coral Aguirre, Teatro del Centro de los Artes (winner of the Puestas en Escena 2004). November 2004 – March 2005.
- Húmedas almohadas, under the author's direction. Outdoor theater of the Esquina Amarilla (Yellow Corner), Sala Experimental, Teatro la Estación, Teatro Calderón. October 2005 – October 2006.
- Galimatías, directed by Mónica Jasso. Sala Experimental. October 2006. (Winner of the Puestas en Escena 2006).

== Dramatic readings ==
- El misterio de Ariadna (Beca del Centro de Escritores de NL. 2003–2004. Leída en la 2ª muestra nacional de la joven dramaturgia en Junio de 2005 en Querétaro).
- Resistencia al cambio (Leído el ciclo de lecturas dramatizadas "Ola Nueva" en Acapulco, Guerrero en junio de 2006).
