= Cornelius House =

Cornelius House may refer to:

In the United States

- Cock-Cornelius House, Locust Valley, New York
- Cornelius House (Mooresville, North Carolina)
- Benjamin Cornelius Jr. House, Forest Grove, Oregon
- Stratton–Cornelius House, Portland, Oregon
- Charles and Theresa Cornelius House, Neillsville, Wisconsin
