= Corwin (given name) =

Corwin is a masculine given name which may refer to:

- Corrie Artman (1907–1970), American National Football League player
- Corwin Brown (born 1970), American National Football League coach and retired player
- Corwin Clairmont (born 1946), Native American printmaker and artist
- Corwin Clatt (1924–1997), American football player
- Corwin Hansch (1918–2011), American chemist and professor
- Corwin M. Nixon (1913–2003), American politician
- Corwin of Amber, the protagonist of the first five books of Roger Zelazny's Chronicles of Amber
