= Cande Lázaro =

Spanish filmmaker and artist (born 1997)

Cande Lázaro (b. 1997) is a Spanish filmmaker and artist.

== Early life ==
Cande Lázaro was born in Badajoz in 1997. They graduated from Carlos III University of Madrid with a degree in Audiovisual Communication. They later earned a Documentary Film Certificate from the Madrid Film Institute.

== Career ==
On September 8, they held the photography exhibition QUIERO SER DANZANTE, inspired by the fanzine Aberruntos. Labrar profundo, hacer un hoyo, at the Cultural and Artistic Center Alfarería Pedro Mercedes.

In 2024, they directed the feature-length documentary La Pastora. The film follows the lives of Florenci Pla Meseguer, an intersex maquis who lived in 1917 and left their village to join the Levante and Aragon Guerrilla Group, and Cande Lázaro, a transmasculine artist living in 2018. The documentary creates a direct dialogue between past and present, as well as between rural and urban worlds, through the experiences of queer individuals. It also addresses topics such as identity construction and the external gaze.

In March of the same year, they were one of six filmmakers selected for the tenth edition of Ikusmira Berriak, a residency program that supports emerging artists.

== Filmography ==
- ID Copy (2020) — Director, writer, and editor.
- Azul (2020) — Director, writer, and editor.
- Mar(i)cona (2021) — Director, writer, and editor.
- La Pastora (2024) — Director and writer.

== Personal life ==
Cande Lázaro is a non-binary person.
