= Cornelio =

Cornelio or Cornélio may refer to:

- Cornelio Bentivoglio (1668–1732), Italian nobleman and cardinal
- Cornelio Da Montalcino, Franciscan friar who embraced Judaism, burned alive in 1554
- Cornelio Fabro (1911–1995), Italian Catholic priest and philosopher
- Cornelio Heredia (1920–2004), Peruvian footballer
- Cornelio Musso (born 1511), Italian Friar Minor Conventual, and Bishop of Bitonto
- Cornélio Penna (1896–1958), Brazilian novelist and plastic artist
- Cornélio Pires (1884–1958), journalist, writer, and Brazilian folklorist
- Cornelio Reyna (1940–1997), Mexican norteño singer
- Cornelio Saavedra (1761–1829), military man, born to a noble family in present-day Bolivia
- Cornelio Saavedra Province, province in the North-eastern parts of the Bolivian department of Potosí
- Cornelio Saavedra Rodríguez (1823–1891), Chilean politician and military figure
- Cornelio Sommaruga (born 1932), prominent Swiss humanitarian, lawyer and diplomat, President of the ICRC 1987–1999
- Cornelio Velásquez (born 1968), jockey in American Thoroughbred horse racing
- Cornelio Villareal (1904–1992), Filipino politician
- Cornelio Wigwigan (1942–2005), Filipino bishop of the Catholic Church
- Enrique Cornelio Osornio Martínez de los Ríos (1868–1945), Mexican politician and military surgeon
- Estadio Cornelio Santos, football stadium in Campamento, Honduras
- Maria Valentina Plaza Cornelio, Governor of the Philippine province of Agusan del Sur
- Roman Catholic Diocese of Cornélio Procópio, diocese located in the city of Cornélio Procópio in Londrina, Brazil
