= Con (name) =

Con is a short form of the following given names

- Cornelius
- Conrad
- Constantine
- Connor or Conor

Con is also a given name on its own that may refer to

- Con Conrad (1891–1938), American songwriter and producer
- Con Colleano (1899–1973), Australian tightrope walker
- Con Cremin (1908–1987), Irish diplomat
- Con Lehane (Irish republican) (1911–1983), Irish nationalist
- Con O'Neill (diplomat) (1912–1988), British civil servant and diplomat
- Con Houlihan (1925–2012), Irish sportswriter
- Con Constantine (born 1945), Cypriot-Australian businessman
- Con Coughlin, (born 1955), British journalist and author
- Con Boutsianis (born 1971), Australian football player
- Con Blatsis (born 1977), Greek-Australian football player
- Con Sullivan, New Zealand rugby player
- Con Kolivas, Australian anaesthetist

Con is also a surname of the following people

- Mac Con, a High King of Ireland
- Marin Con (born 1985), Croatian footballer

== See also ==
- Conn (name)
