= Coralee =

Coralee is a feminine given name. Notable people with the name include:

- Coralee Oakes (born 1972), Canadian politician
- Coralee O'Rourke, Australian politician
- Coralee Elliott Testar (born 1946), Vancouver based producer and screenwriter

== See also ==
- Coralie
