= Charles III University of Madrid =

Public university in Madrid, Spain

Universidad Carlos III de Madrid
- Other name: UC3M
- Motto: "Homo homini sacra res"
- Motto in English: Man is a sacred thing to man
- Type: Public university
- Established: 1989
- Academic affiliations: UNICA
- Rector: Ángel Arias Hernández
- Faculty: 1,987
- Administrative staff: 681
- Students: 18,676 (2012/13)
- Undergraduates: 15,090 (2012/13)
- Postgraduates: 2,315 (2012/13)
- Doctoral students: 988 (2012/13)
- Location: Getafe, Leganés, Colmenarejo, and Madrid, Community of Madrid, Spain
- Campus: Urban (3) & Rural (1)
- Colors: Blue & white
- Website: uc3m.es
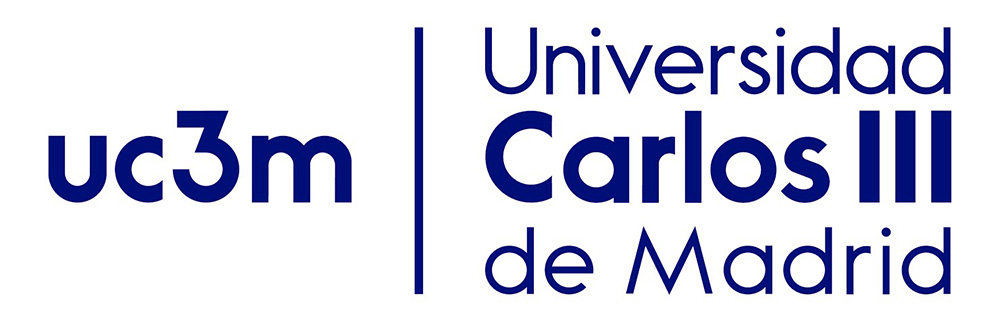

Charles III University of Madrid (Spanish: Universidad Carlos III de Madrid) (UC3M) is a public university in the Community of Madrid, Spain. Established in 1989, UC3M is an institution with a distinctly international profile. It offers a broad range of master's and bachelor's degree programs in English, and nearly 20% of the student body is made up of international students. It is the top-ranked university in Spain and the third-ranked in Europe in the number of its students participating in the Erasmus student exchange programs.

It also holds the highest admission grade requirement in Madrid for several degree programs such as business, law, political science, economics, international studies, accounting, journalism or biomedical engineering. The university has a strong reputation in business subjects, in particular economics, for which it is regularly ranked amongst the top 75 institutions worldwide according to the QS World University Rankings. It also ranks among the world's top 200 universities in employability according to the same rankings.

The university's motto is "Homo homini sacra res" ("Man is a sacred thing to man"), a quote adapted from Seneca (Ad Lucilium XCV:33: "Homo, sacra res homini").

== Campuses ==
UC3M has four Campuses divided into the following Schools and Centers:

- Getafe Campus: School of Law and Social Sciences and the School of Humanities, Communication and Documentation.
- Leganés Campus: School of Engineering.
- Colmenarejo Campus: Degree programs from different schools are offered on this campus.
- Madrid-Puerta de Toledo Campus: Center for Graduate Studies.

=== Getafe Campus ===
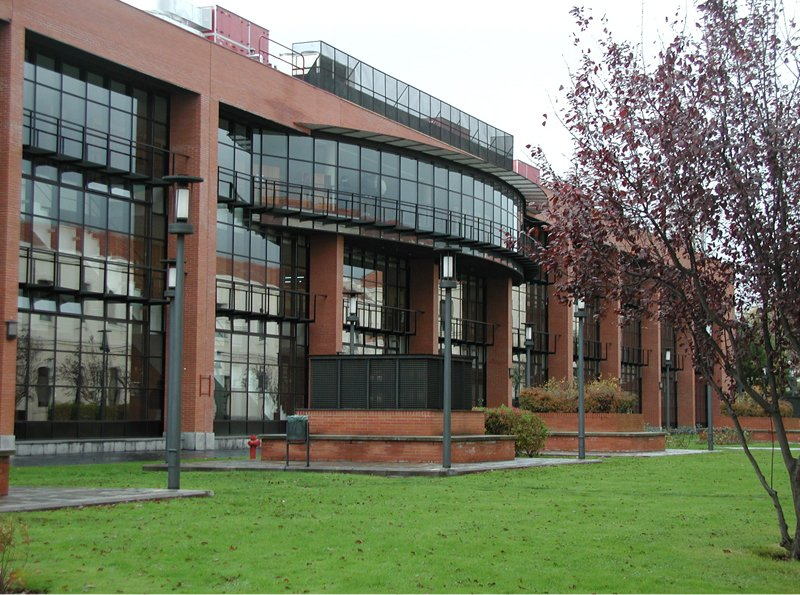
School of Social Sciences and Law in the Getafe Campus

Located within the greater Madrid metropolitan area in the town of Getafe, the campus is 13 kilometers south of the Spanish capital.

Facilities: libraries, computer rooms, multimedia rooms, television and recording studios, court rooms, language resource and activity rooms, sport centers equipped with indoor pool and spas, and student residence halls.

==== Gallery ====
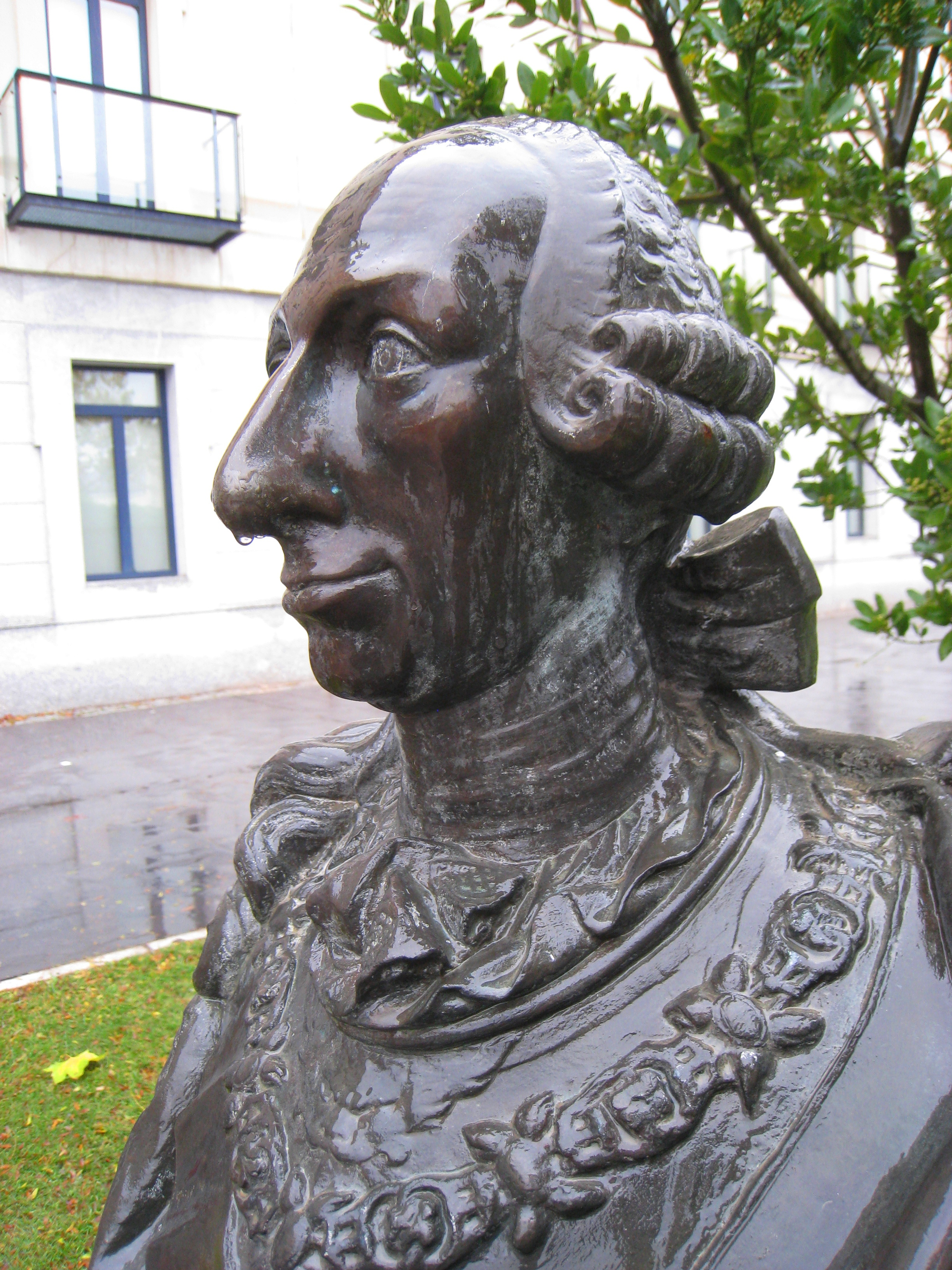
Bust of King Charles III of Spain, Universidad Carlos III

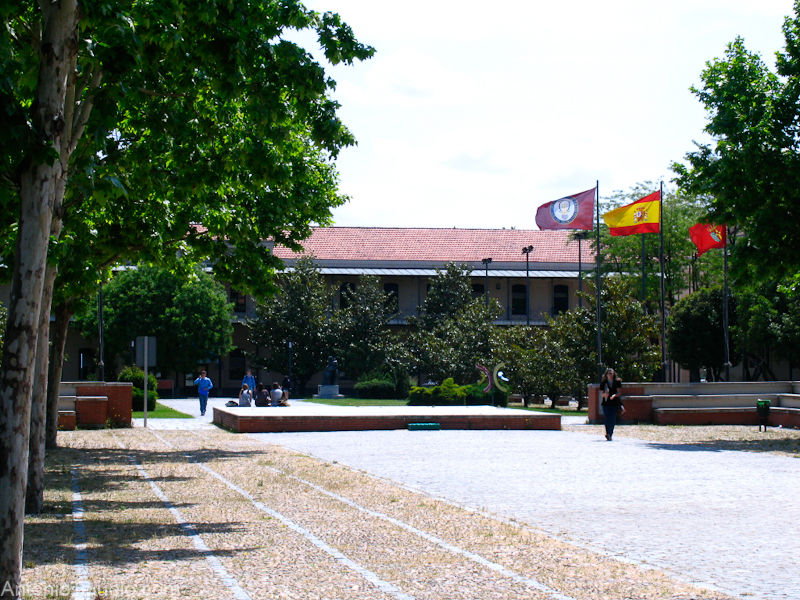

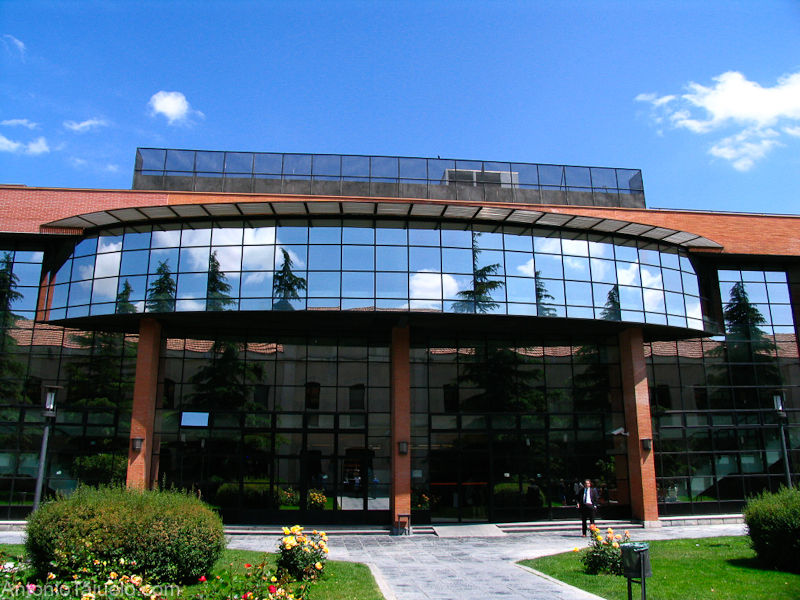

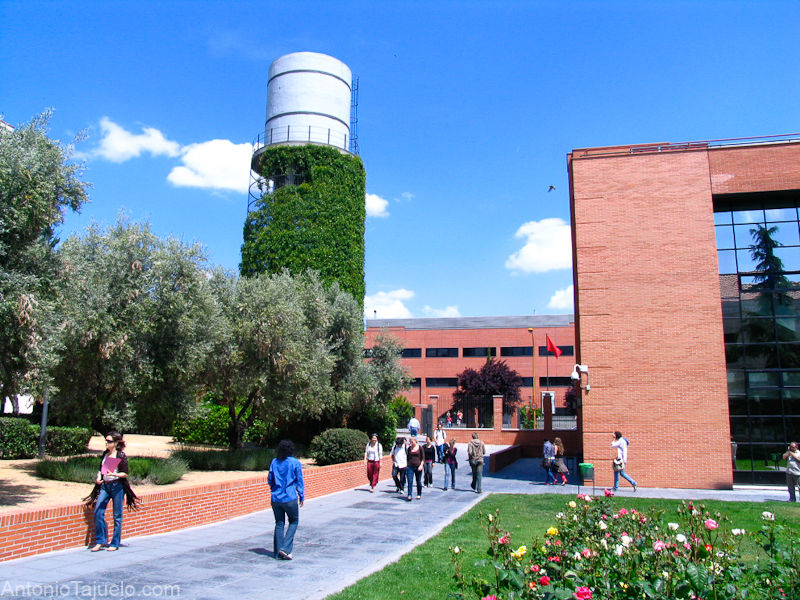

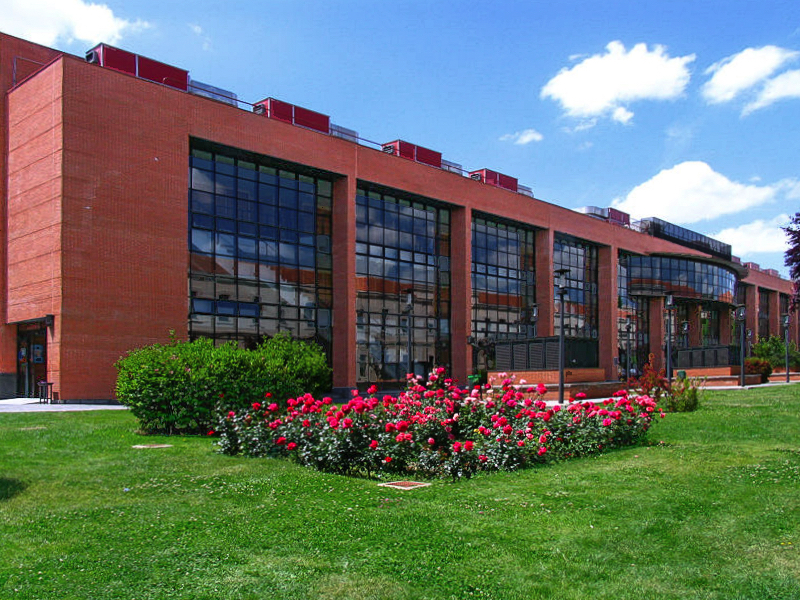

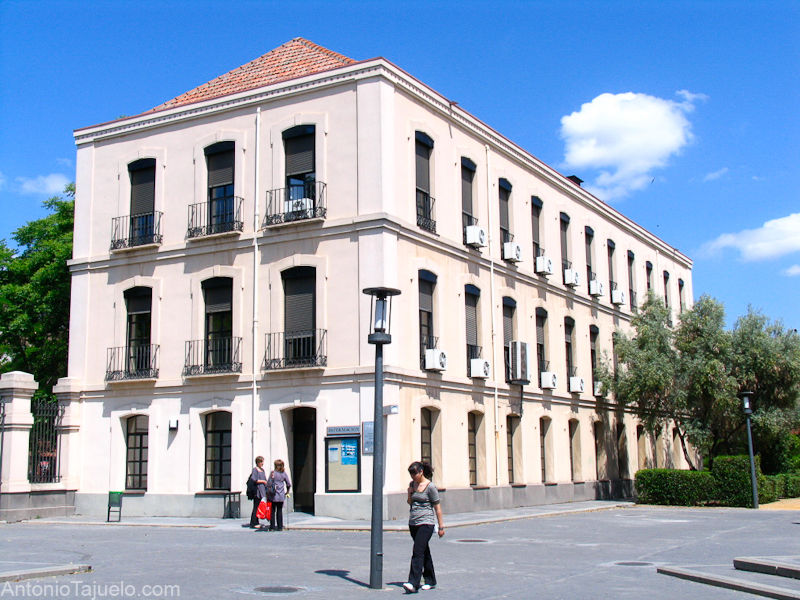

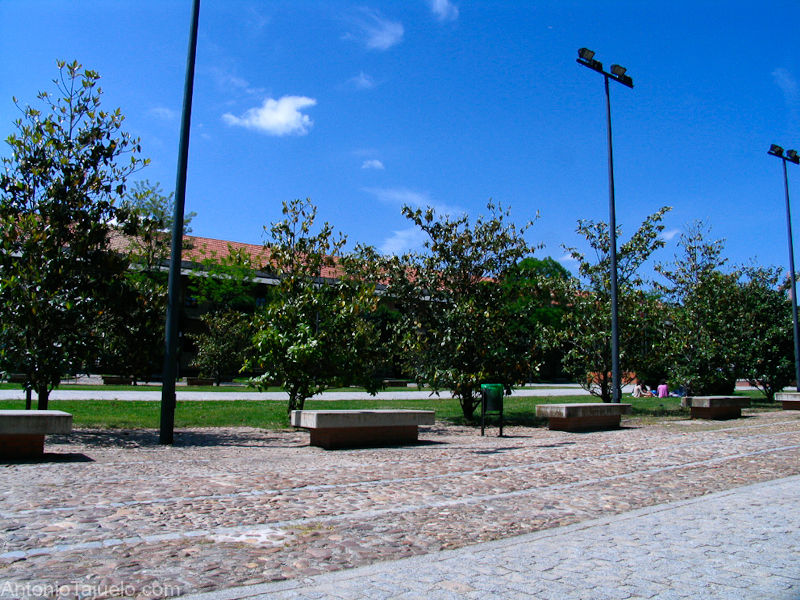

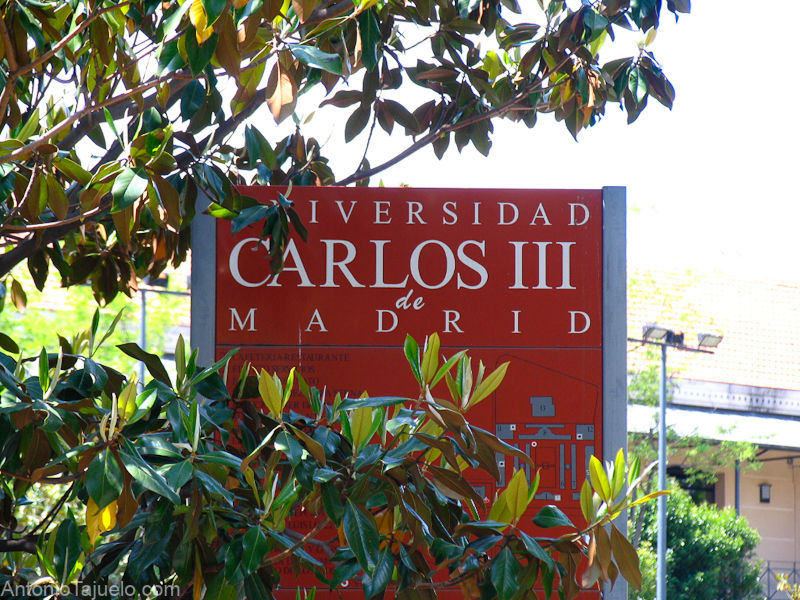

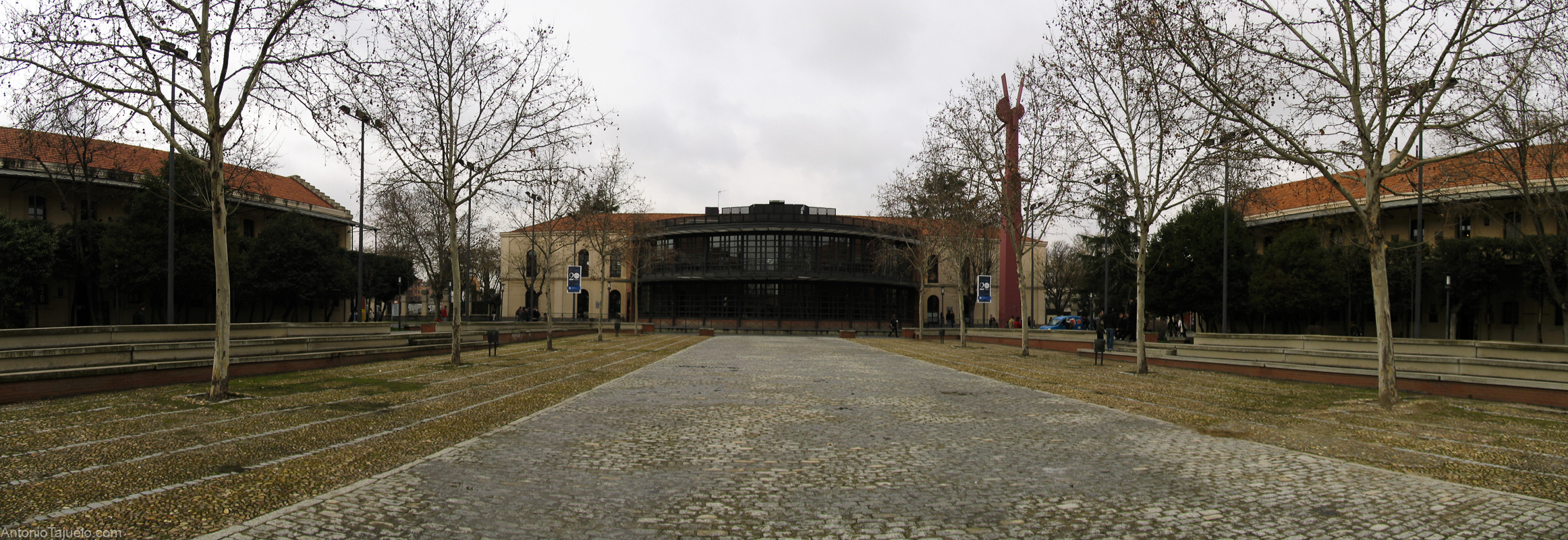

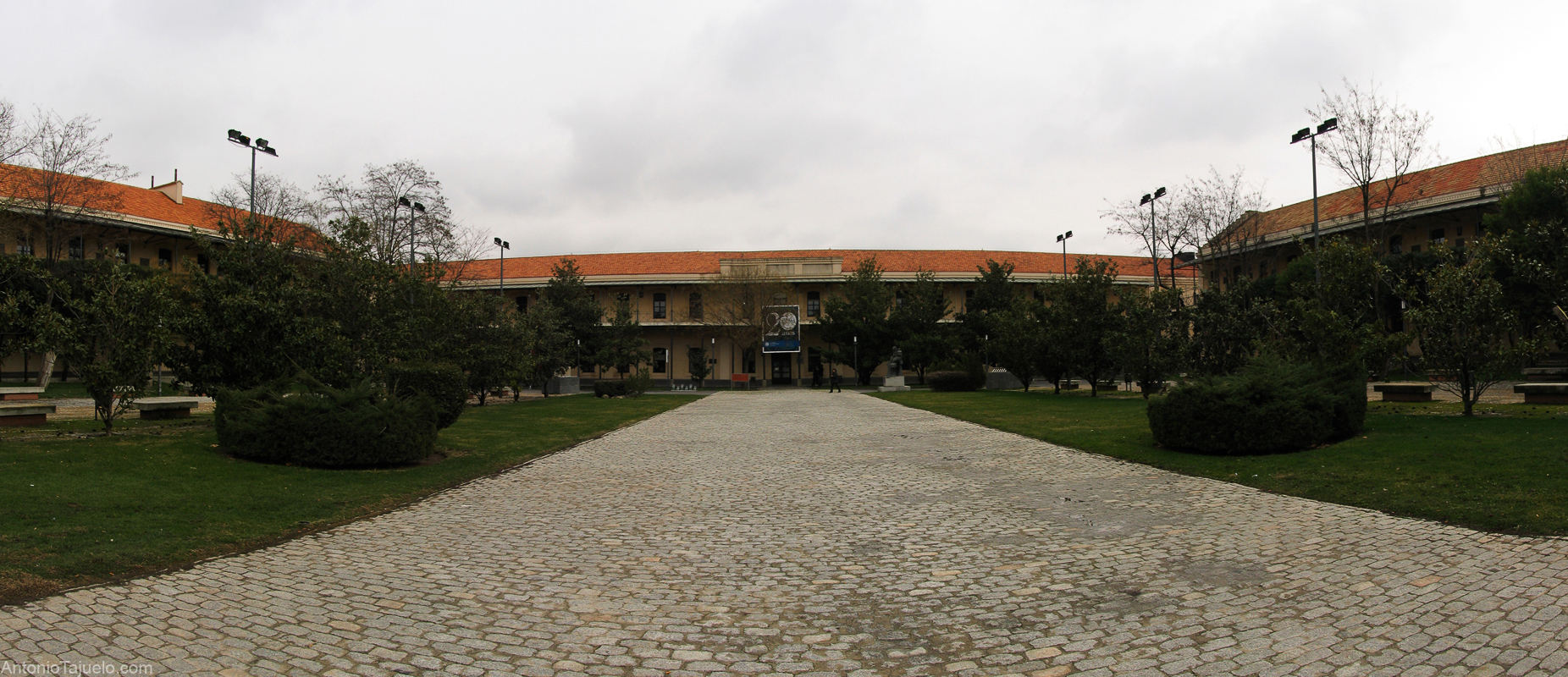

=== Leganés Campus ===
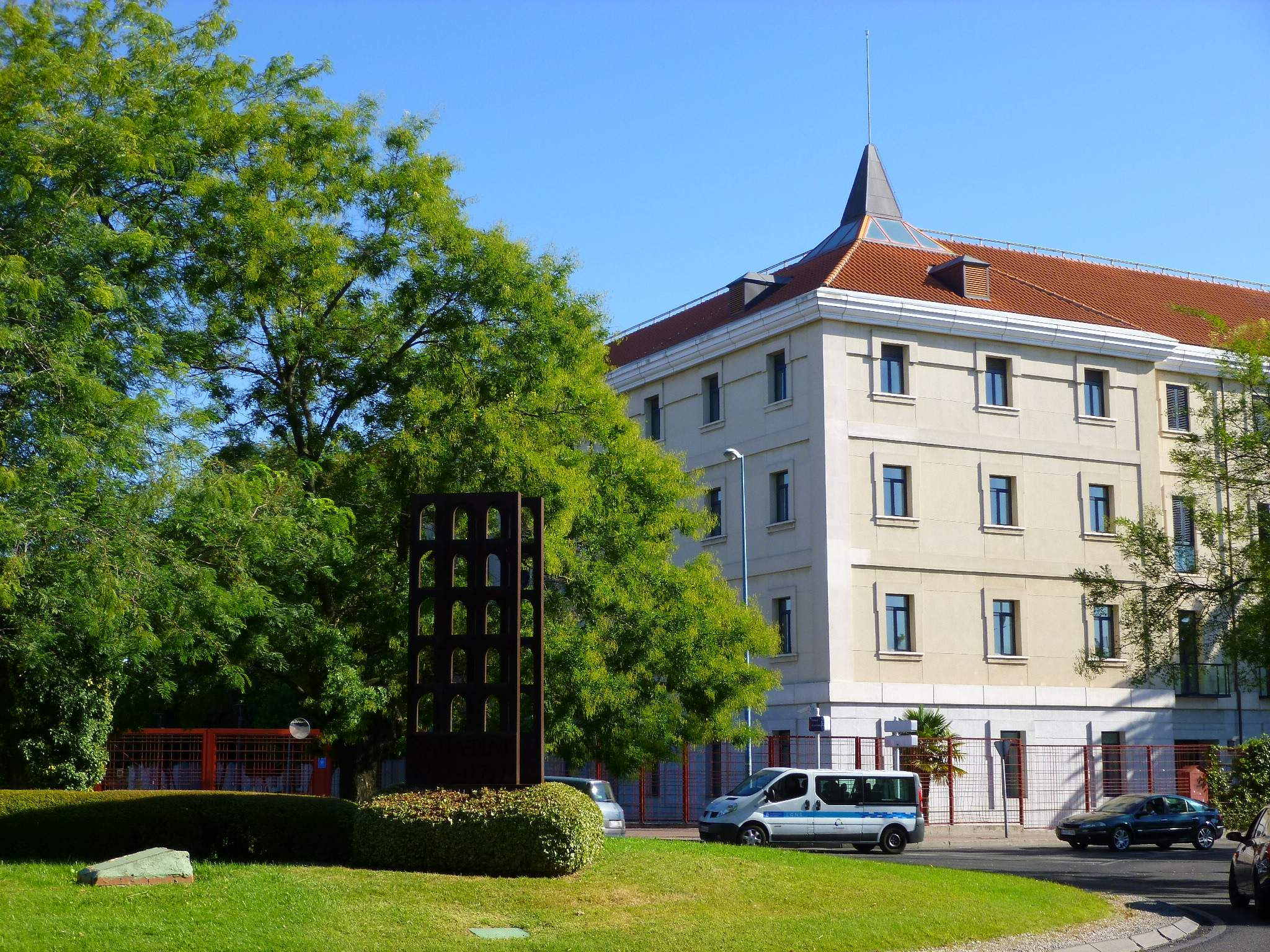
Leganés Campus

Located within the greater Madrid metropolitan area in the town of Leganes, the campus is 11 kilometers southeast of the Spanish capital.

Facilities: experimental laboratories for courses in bioengineering, computer science, aerospace engineering, mechanical engineering, and robotics, etc., library, computer rooms, multimedia rooms, a language resource and activity room, a sports center equipped with indoor pool, student residence hall, and an auditorium with a seating capacity of 1,000.

==== Gallery ====
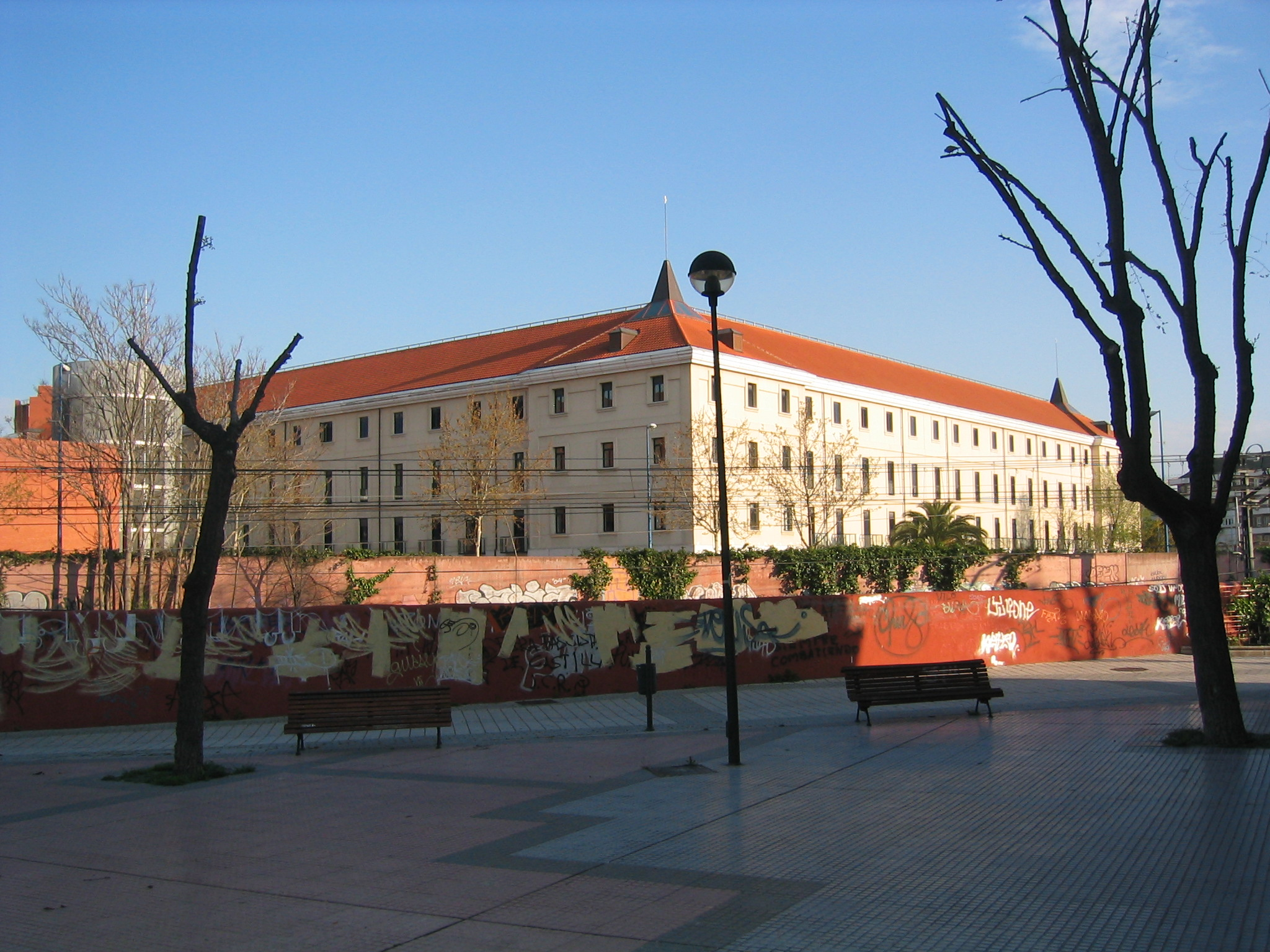

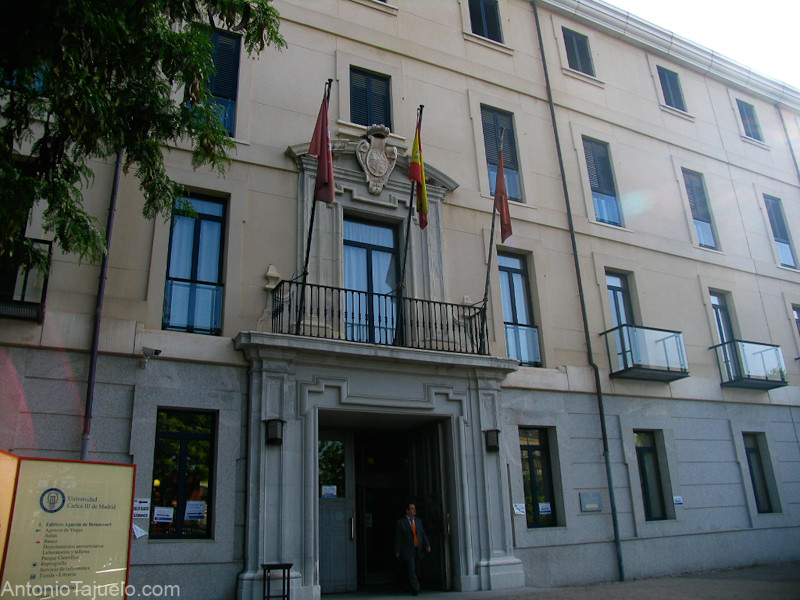

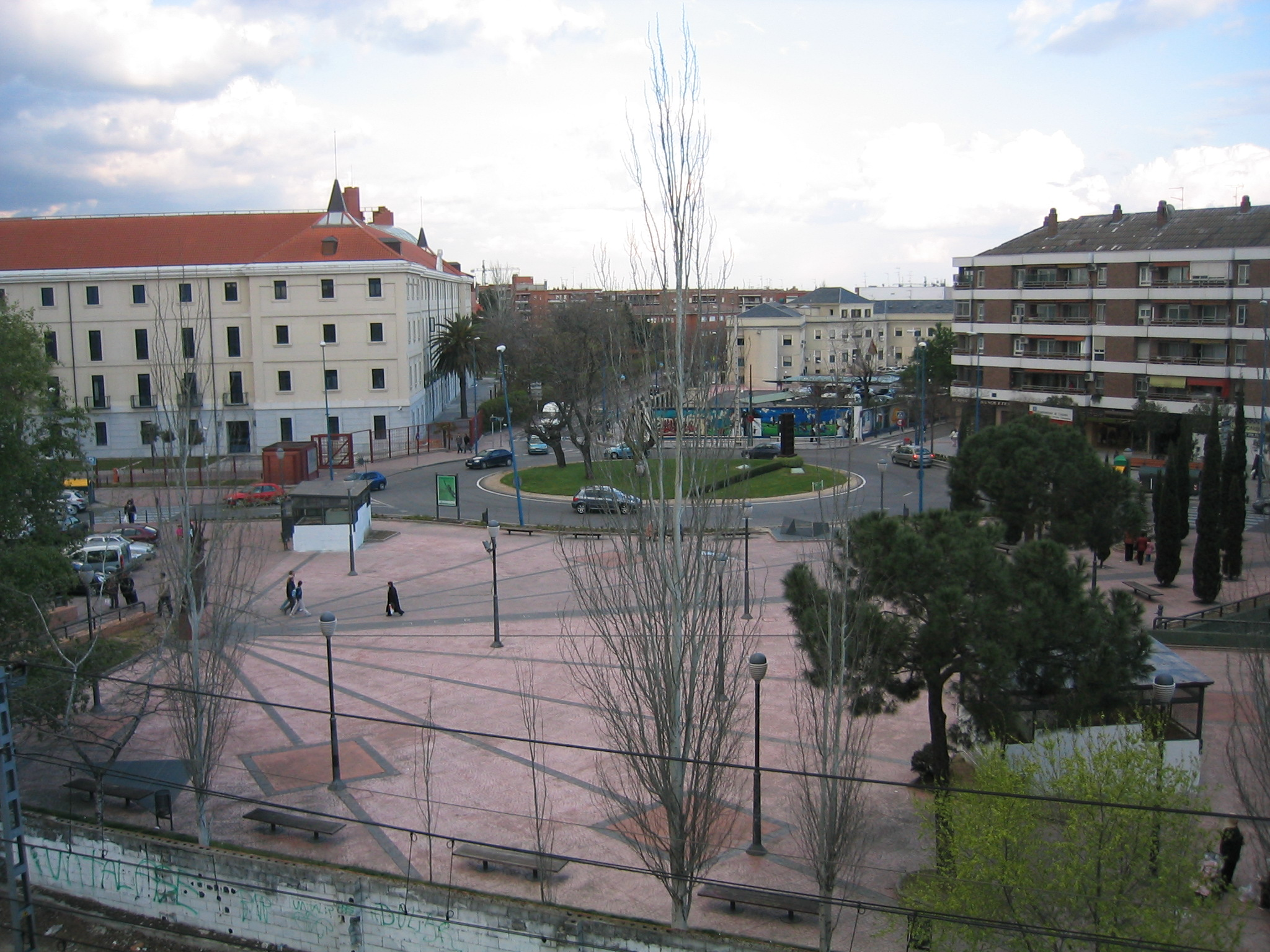

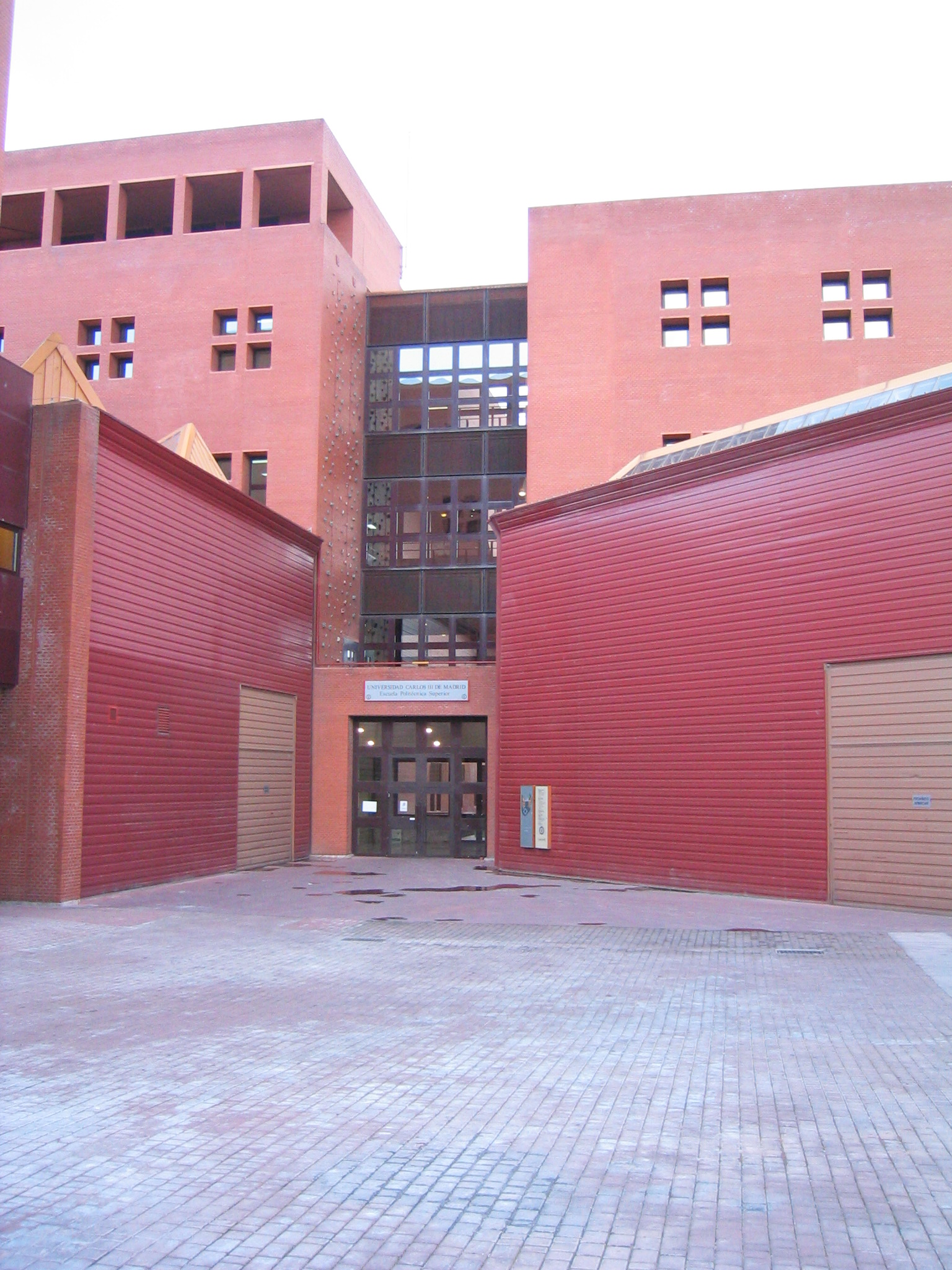

=== Colmenarejo Campus ===
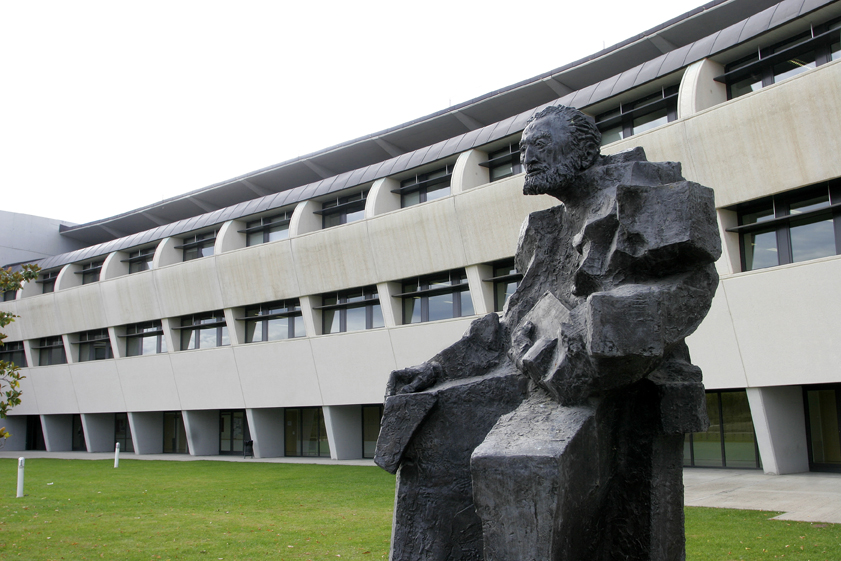
Colmenarejo Campus

Located within the province of Madrid in the town of Colmenarejo, the campus is 36 kilometers northeast of the Spanish capital.

Facilities: library, computer rooms, a language resource and activity room, and a multimedia room.

=== Madrid - Puerta de Toledo Campus ===
Located in the historic and cultural heart of Madrid, this campus is home to the university's official master's programs and its own UC3M-accredited master's programs. Many of the institution's cultural and artistic events and activities are held on this campus.

Facilities: library, computer rooms, multimedia rooms and a multi-purpose room.

== Rankings ==
University rankings

Global – Overall
- ARWU World: 901–1000 (2023)
- QS World: 301 (2026)
- THE World: 801–1000 (2024)
- USNWR Global: =852 (2023)

It is the first Spanish university and the 22nd in the world in the QS ranking of the 50 best universities in the world under 50 years of age and is included in the THE World University Rankings. It is also a leader in the Erasmus+ student mobility ranking.

The undergraduate degrees in Business Administration, Economics and Law are ranked first, first and second respectively among those offered by public and private universities in Spain, and its Master and Ph.D. programs also rank top in the country. The Department of Economics is among the 50 best worldwide, and in the top 10 worldwide best in econometrics. The economic historian Leandro Prados de la Escosura is teaching at the university.

== Education ==
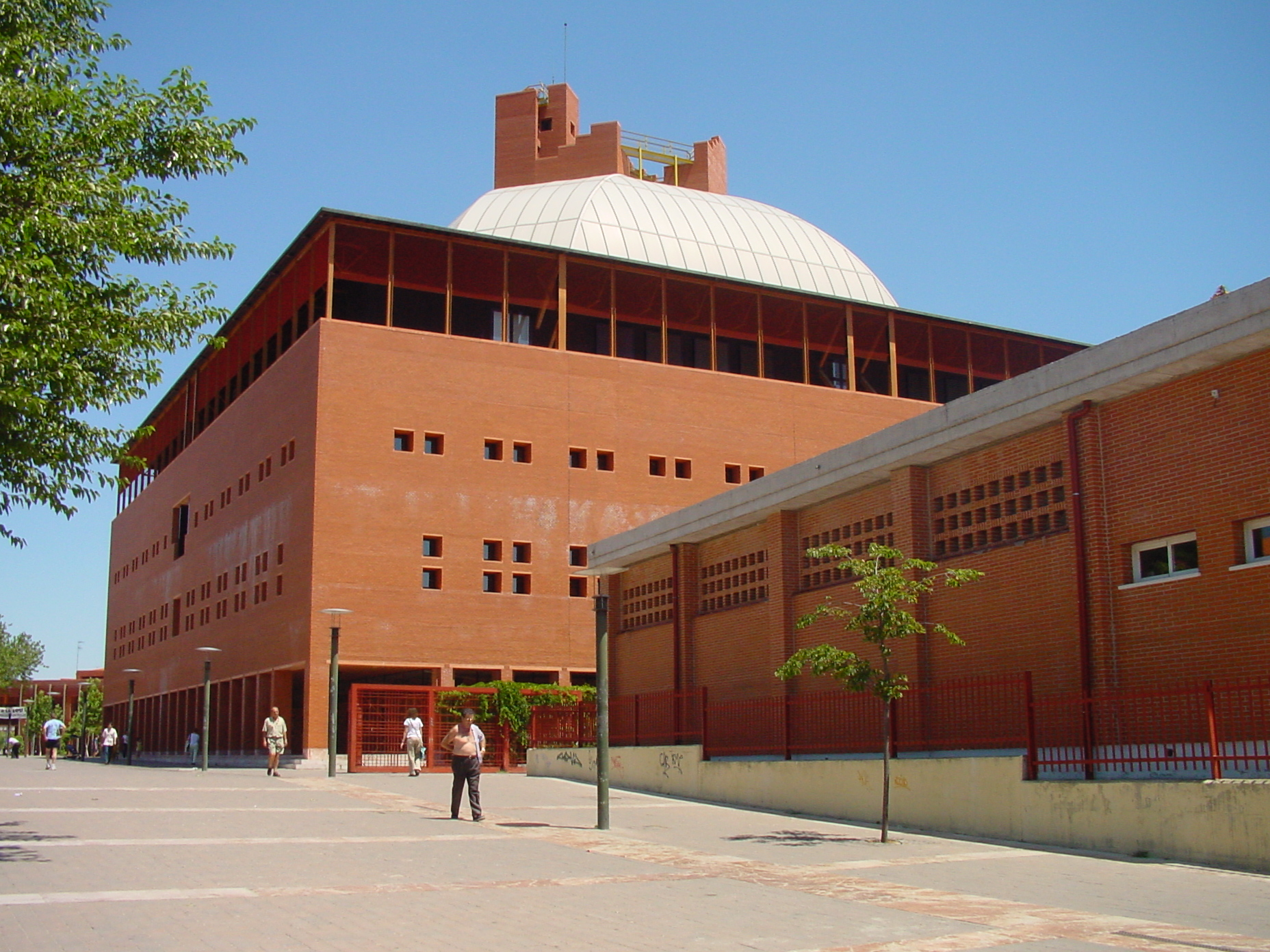
Rey Pastor library

The university offers curricula fully adapted to the EU Bologna Process. It is well known for the quality of academic research, its international orientation and its higher than average study workload. It offers bilingual degrees, taught both in English and Spanish, in economics, business, actuaries and finance, and computer, industrial, biomedical engineering and telecommunications engineering. It also offers joint degrees in economics and law, and in business and law. All students, regardless of their concentration, must fulfill a humanities requirement, and elementary fluency in a foreign language, generally English but also German, French or Italian, is also required.

=== Online courses ===
In addition to their regular classes, the university offers MOOCs on both the edX and Miríadax platform. Currently, they provide 13 MOOCs on subjects ranging from structural mechanics to public procurement and European paintings. The courses are taught in both English and Spanish and take, on average, two months to complete. A digital statement of accomplishment is then issued if the student has received the passing grade or more.

== Notable alumni ==
- Carlos Ayala Vargas, Spanish politician. Founder of the Pirate Party of Spain
- Roberto Gil Zuarth, Mexican politician
- Fernando Lorenzo, Uruguayan economist and politician
- Maheta Molango, Swiss footballer.
- Javier Suárez, Spanish economist
- Pablo Iglesias Turrión, Spanish writer and politician. Founder of Podemos
- Omar Ayuso, Spanish actor
- Claudia Martín, Mexican actress and communicologist
- Tomás Ocaña, Spanish journalist
- Manu Brabo, Spanish photojournalist
- Cande Lázaro, Spanish filmmaker and artist
- Coral Herrera, Spanish and Costa Rican writer

== Notable faculty ==
- Rocío Orsi, Spanish philosopher

== Financing of the university ==
Public universities in Spain occupy a large share of the national budget. Almost 80% of the funding for public universities is borne by the taxpayers, with student fees accounting for most of the remainder of this funding. Universities in Spain do not have final oversight over their funding; this is done by the government which receives, administers, and distributes all sources of revenue.

=== Financing projects ===
The UC3M uses the crowdfunding system to finance its projects. The process usually involves four main steps: Firstly a scientist, student or an alumnus will develop an idea about research, innovation, and/or the diffusion of knowledge. Secondly, they spread this idea via Gotero.org, which is a website where donors can search for and endorse projects listed on the webpage. Thirdly, an interested donor will begin financing a project. Finally, the project reaches sufficient levels of funding, publicity, and related improvements to become reality.

There are several different types of crowdfunding. Rewards-based crowdfunding is when a sponsor funds a project for an incentive or reward in return, generally products or services that result from the project. Equity crowdfunding results in a sponsor receiving some form of equity in return for their investment. Debt-based funding involves a sponsor lending money to the project, with the promise of their investment being returned plus interest. Donation-based crowdfunding involves a donor investing out of altruistic interest, without any interest in financial or material rewards in return.

Crowdfunding has provided opportunities to many people for developing campus projects. At UC3M, Isabel García Gutiérrez, who is the vice-rector of the entrepreneurship and science park, said that the university turned to this system because of its innovative potential. The prior experience of the Polytechnic University of Catalonia's use of the crowdfunding system was also a helpful example to model from.

==== Financing cultural, sports, and volunteer activities ====
The UC3M as with all other public universities received government funding, so students' tuition fees are a small percentage of the actual education costs. However, extra-curricular activities such as cultural, sports and volunteerism activities are not included in the enrollment fees and require additional fees for participation.

===== UC3M Foundation =====
The UC3M Foundation is a private nonprofit organization. Created in 1990, its objectives are the promotion and financing of social, cultural, and scientific activities.

Objectives of the UC3M Foundation:

College extension: This includes courses for seniors (cultural programs and classroom continuing education) and seminars on exchanges and financial markets for academic credit. The You click course is directed towards young people who want to enter the labor market as professionals with improved knowledge about social media, networking, communication and digital characters.

Language Center: Focus on development in different languages like English, French, German, Chinese, Italian and others; presenting opportunities for students to be more motivated in learning languages; using new technologies and assistance with preparation for the different languages exams.

Guidance and employment (SOPP): Large-platform focus on giving facilities to students and companies to take advantage in the future contracting of students in order to gain experience for the labour market.

Dormitories and accommodation: Providing facilities for accommodation to students and university faculty. Consists of three large facilities, two in Getafe (Gregorio Peces-Barba and Fernando de los Ríos dormitories) and one in Leganés (Fernando Abril Matorell). All of these facilities are in close proximity to their respective campuses. An increasing number of both foreign students and students from other parts of Spain is rising demand in the residences.

Publications and reports: Study and analyze the impacts in today's world of the different degrees offered by the university.

Social commitment: Primarily intended to financially assist students with merit-based needs, disabilities, and lower-income students. This also includes the importance of donations of surplus equipment to various NGOs, recycling, and positive synergies with related organizations.
