= Rocío Orsi =

Spanish writer (1976–2014)

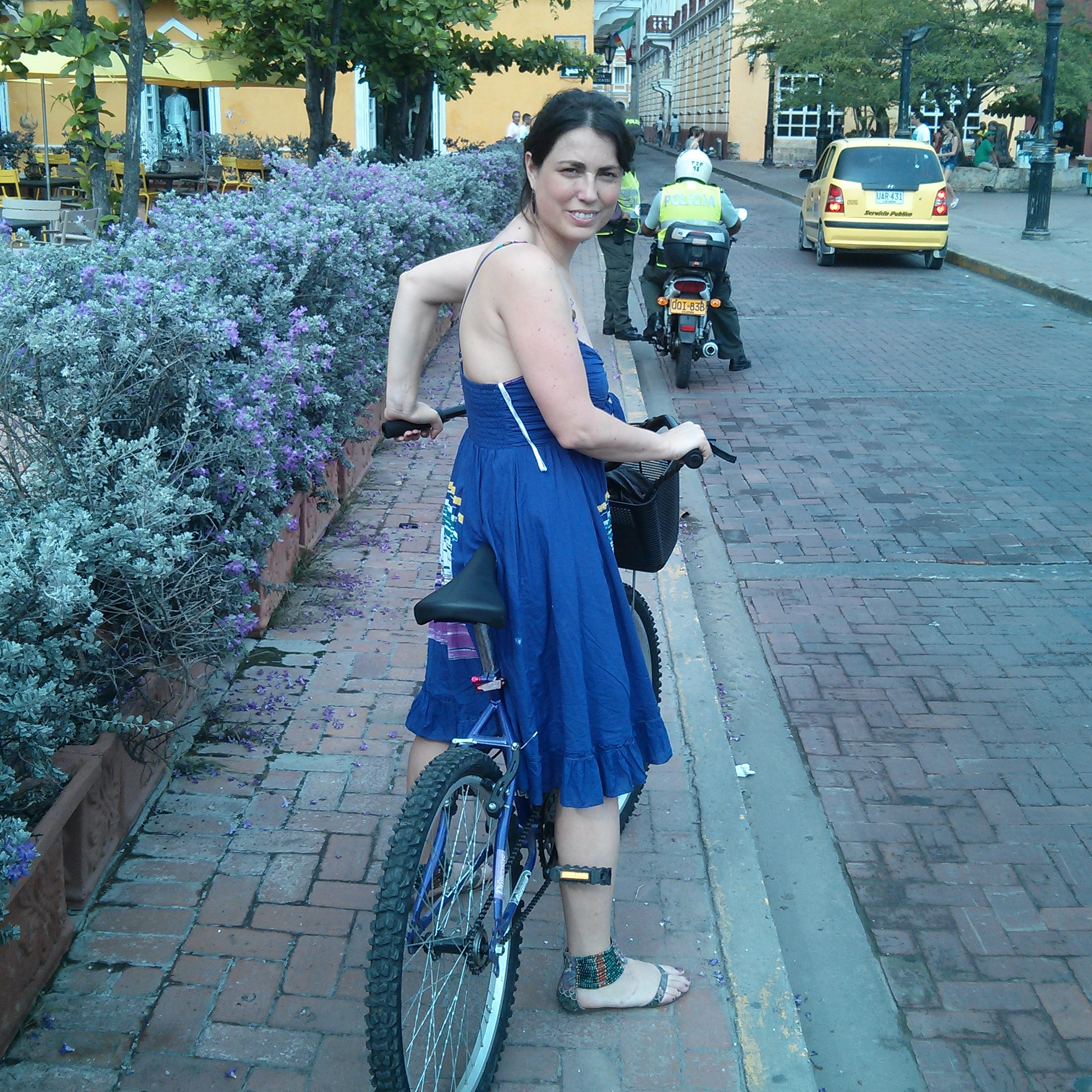
- (2013)
- Born: 3 February 1976; Madrid, Spain
- Died: 29 November 2014 (aged 38); Madrid, Spain
- Occupations: Philosopher; professor

Education
- Education: Autonomous University of Madrid; Charles III University of Madrid
- Thesis: Ti chre poiein, pensamiento y acción en Sófocles (2005)
- Doctoral advisor: Antonio Valdecantos

Rocío Orsi Portalo (3 February 1976 – 29 November 2014) was a Spanish philosopher, essayist, and translator, as well as a professor of philosophy at Charles III University of Madrid (UC3M). She is considered to be one of the most important Spanish-language thinkers of her generation.

== Education ==
Rocío Orsi studied high school at Covadonga High School and a degree in philosophy at the Autonomous University of Madrid, and received her Ph.D. from UC3M in March 2006, with a thesis, directed by Antonio Valdecantos, entitled Ti chre poiein, pensamiento y acción en Sophocles, which would give rise to her book El saber del error. (The knowledge of error).

== Career and research ==
Since 1999, she was a research fellow at UC3M and a professor since 2004. She developed research and work stays in Paris, Cambridge, New York City (Columbia University), and Bologna, Italy, participating in numerous research projects. She was instrumental in the founding and activities of the Grupo Kóre Estudios de Género.

She was assistant vice-dean of the Faculty of Humanities, Communication and Documentation at UC3M, and a member of the boards of the Sociedad Académica de Filosofía and the Asociación Española de Ética y Filosofía Política, as well as of the editorial board of the journal Isegoría. She was also active in civil society. She was one of the first signatories of the manifesto, Libres e Iguales.

Orsi cultivated the history of ideas, political and moral philosophy, epistemology, gender studies, and political economy. Her initial topics of interest were the relations between philosophy and literature and between epistemological and moral problems. She was later concerned with questions of the philosophy of history and, in the period immediately preceding her untimely death, planned a systematic study of ancient skepticism and its modern reception.

== Death and legacy ==
Orsi died of cancer in 2014. Since 2016, UC3M has awarded the Rocío Orsi Prize to the best master's degree thesis in the Faculty of Humanities, Communication and Documentation.

== Selective works ==
=== Books ===
- El saber del error. Filosofía y tragedia en Sófocles, 2007.
- Butterfield y la razón histórica, 2013.
- La economía a la intemperie, with Andrés González, 2015.

=== As editor ===
- El desencanto como promesa. Fundamentación, alcance y límites de la razón práctica, Rocío Orsi, ed., Biblioteca Nueva, Madrid, 2006, with Carlos Thiebaut, prologue by Javier Muguerza.
- Ritmos contemporáneos. Género, política y sociedad en los siglos XIX y XX, Rocío Orsi and Laura Branciforte, eds., Dykinson, Madrid, 2012.
- La guillotina del poder, Rocío Orsi and Laura Branciforte, eds., Plaza y Valdés, Madrid, 2015.
