= Tomás Ocaña =

Spanish journalist (born 1984)

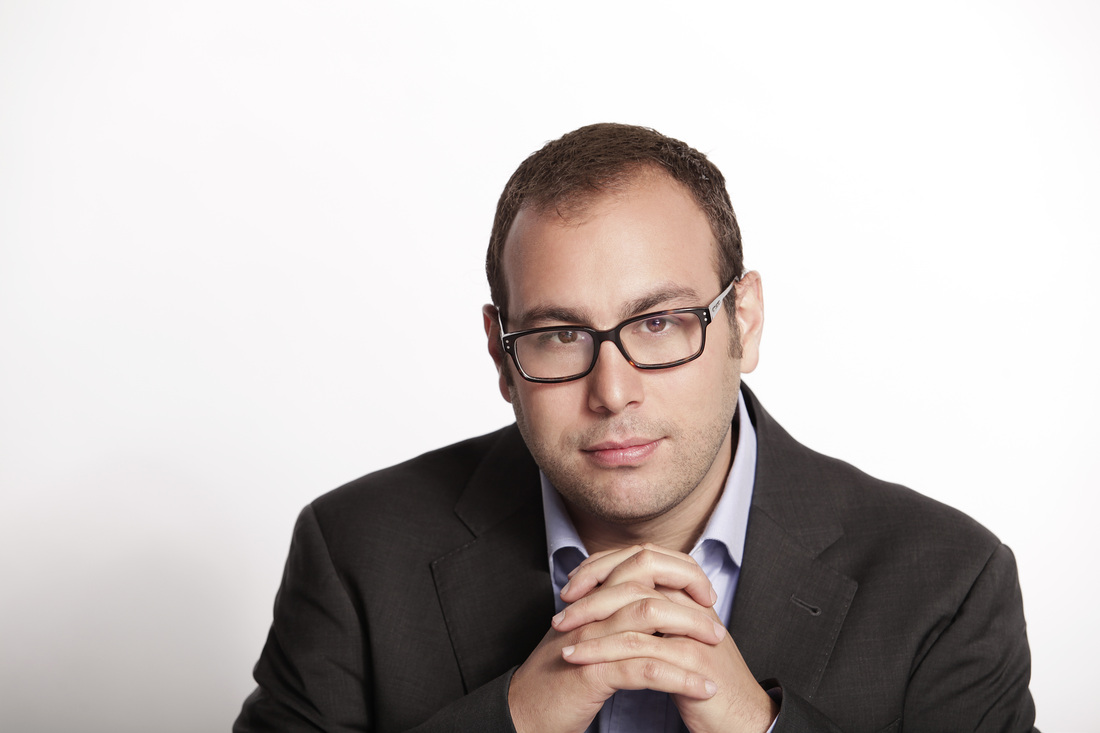
Tomás Ocaña Urwitz

Tomás Ocaña Urwitz (born January 20, 1984) is a Spanish investigative journalist with Univision News. He has contributed to major international investigations, including the Panama Papers and Swiss Leaks.

Between 2012 and 2016, he reported on cross-border money laundering, illicit arms trafficking, forced labor in mining, and cartel-linked human trafficking. His work earned recognition the Peabody Awards and the Investigative Reporters and Editors Awards.

== Career ==
Ocaña holds degrees in law and journalism from Carlos III University of Madrid. He began his career in journalism at CNN+ and Cuatro before becoming executive producer of El Telediario de Intereconomía. In January 2012, he joined the newly formed documentaries department at Univision, where he worked on several investigative projects. One of his early productions, PRESSured, co-directed with Mariana Atencio, focused on press freedom in Latin America. The documentary received the Gracie Award from the Alliance for Women in Media in 2014.

Ocaña later became a news reporter and producer at Univision Investiga, the investigative branch of the network, under journalist Gerardo Reyes.

One of his reports, "El Chapo Guzmán, The Eternal Fugitive" (2014), broadcast before the 2015 escape and 2016 recapture of the Mexican drug lord, earned an Emmy Award for Best Investigative Journalism in Spanish.

Another investigation, "Fast and Furious: Arming the Enemy," tracked firearms from an operation led by the Bureau of Alcohol, Tobacco, Firearms and Explosives (ATF). The report won a Peabody Award and an IRE Award (Investigative Reporters and Editors) for investigative journalism.

Ocaña and the Univision Investiga team also received an Emmy Award as part of the Univision News team that covered the murder of 43 Mexican students in Iguala.

In 2016, the report "Tall Tale" won the National Journalism Award in Mexico for its coverage of the political and business intricacies of US$205 million. The work was conducted by Univision Investiga and the Investigative Reporting Program at the University of California, Berkeley. This joint project was nominated at the 37th Emmy Awards, where Ocaña received two additional nominations.

In 2021, Ocaña directed Lucía en la telaraña, a documentary produced for RTVE, which investigated the unsolved murder of Lucía Garrido near Málaga in 2008.

== Awards ==
- Peabody Award for "Fast and Furious, Arming the Enemy" (2013)
- Investigative Reporters & Editors Award for "Fast and Furious, Arming the Enemy"
- Emmy Award for Outstanding Investigative Journalism in Spanish for "El Chapo, the eternal fugitive"
- Co-director of the documentary PRESSured, Gracie Award for the best documentary (2014)
- Emmy Award for Outstanding Investigative Journalism in Spanish for "Los Nuevos Narcotesoros"
- Part of the team awarded with the Ortega y Gasset Journalism Award in the multimedia category for "Los Nuevos Narcotesoros" (2015)
- Emmy Award for Outstanding Coverage of a Breaking News Story in Spanish for "La Masacre de Iguala"
- National Journalism Award of Mexico in the category Research Report on TV for '"A tall tale'
- Ondas Award for "GAL, the Triangle," an investigative podcast
