= Cor (given name) =

Cor is a common Dutch given name. Its most commonly a masculine name, short for Cornelis (or rarely Cornelius), but also occurs as a feminine name, short for Cornelia. People with the name include:

== Masculine name ==
- Cor Bakker (1918–2011), Dutch racing cyclist
- Cor Bakker (born 1961), Dutch pianist
- Cor Blekemolen (1894–1972), Dutch racing cyclist
- Cor Blommers (1901–1983), Dutch boxer
- Cor Boonstra (1938–2025), Dutch businessman, CEO of Philips
- Cor Braasem (1923–2009), Dutch water polo player
- Cor Brom (1932–2008), Dutch football player and manager
- Cor Dam (1935–2019), Dutch sculptor, painter, illustrator and ceramist
- Cor van Dijkum (born 1950), Dutch sociologist
- Cor Dillen (1920–2009), Dutch businessman, Director of Philips in South America
- Cor Edskes (1925–2015), Dutch historian and organ restorator
- Cor van Eesteren (1897–1988), Dutch architect and urban planner
- Cor Euser (born 1957), Dutch racing driver
- Cor Fuhler (1964–2020), Dutch-Australian experimental musician
- Cor van der Gijp (1931–2022), Dutch footballer
- Cor Gillis (born 1989), Belgian footballer
- Cor Gorter (1907–1980), Dutch physicist
- Cor Groot (1909–1978), Dutch Olympic sailor
- Cor de Groot (1914–1993), Dutch pianist and composer
- Cor van der Hart (1928–2006), Dutch footballer
- Cor Heeren (1900–1976), Dutch racing cyclist
- Cor Hemmers (born 1956), Dutch kickboxing trainer
- Cor Herkströter (born 1937), Dutch businessman, CEO of Royal Dutch Shell
- Cor van den Heuvel (born 1931), American haiku poet, editor and archivist
- Cor van der Hoeven (1921–2017), Dutch footballer
- Cor van Hout (1957–2003), Dutch kidnapper
- Cor de Jager (1925–2001), Dutch general and chairman of the NATO Military Committee
- Cor Kammeraad (1902–1978), Dutch politician
- Cor Kee (1900–1971), Dutch organist and composer
- Cor Kools (1907–1985), Dutch football player and manager
- Cor Lambregts (born 1958), Dutch long-distance runner
- Cor Melchers (1954–2015), Dutch painter
- Cor Pot (born 1951), Dutch football player and manager
- Cor Schilder (born 1941), Dutch Roman Catholic bishop in Kenya
- Cor Schuuring (born 1942), Dutch racing cyclist
- Cor Tabak (1907–2001), Dutch weightlifter
- Cor Varkevisser (born 1982), Dutch footballer
- Cor Veldhoen (1939–2005), Dutch footballer
- Cor Verwoerd (1913–2000), Dutch ceramist
- Cor Visser (1903–1982), Dutch painter active in England
- Cor Vriend (born 1949), Dutch long-distance runner
- Cor Wals (1911–1994), Dutch track cyclist and Nazi collaborator
- Cor Zegger (1897–1961), Dutch swimmer

== Feminine name ==
- Cor Aalten (1913–1991), Dutch sprinter
- Cor van Gelder (1904–1969), Dutch swimmer
- Cor Kint (1920–2002), Dutch swimmer

== Fictional characters ==
- Shasta (Narnia), later known as Cor of Archenland, in C. S. Lewis's Chronicles of Narnia.

== See also ==
- Cor (disambiguation)
- Corrie (given name)
