= Corrie Block =

Canadian executive coach (born 1975)

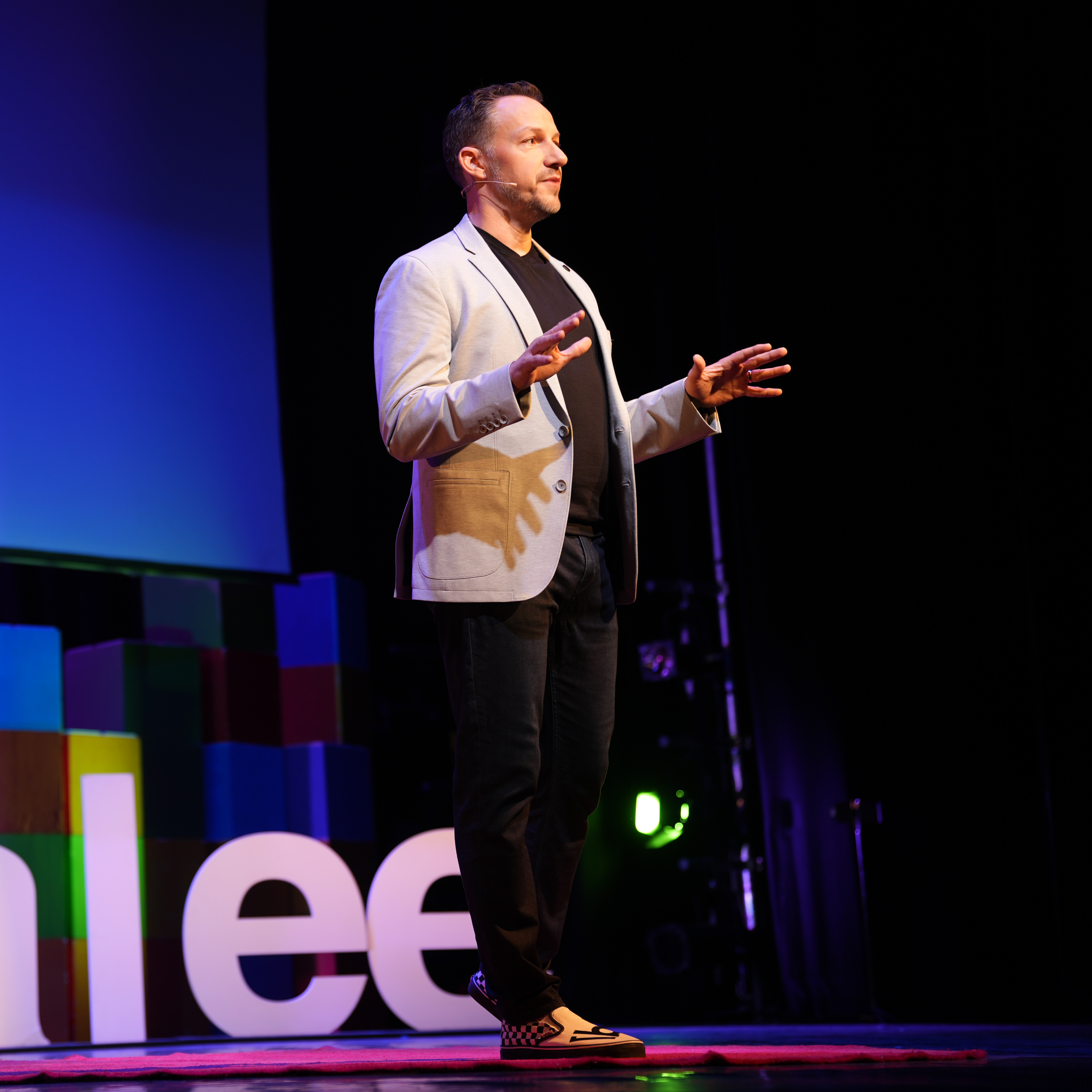
- Corrie Block in 2024
- Born: Corrie Jonn Block; 3 April 1975 (age 51); Calgary, Canada
- Occupations: Executive coach, Public speaker, Author, Management consultant
- Spouse: Nicole Block
- Website: corrieblock.com

Corrie Jonn Block (born 3 April 1975) is a Canadian executive coach, author, and public speaker specializing in organizational behaviour and leadership. He has been featured in publications such as Forbes, Entrepreneur, The Evening Leader, The CEO Magazine, The NYC Journal, and Gulf Business. In 2024, his book Love@Work: The Final Frontier of Empathy in Leadership reached the top of Amazon's bestseller list in the Management category.

== Early life ==
Block was raised in Calgary, Canada. He graduated from North Delta Senior Secondary School in Vancouver in 1993.

After spending 18 months at Summit Pacific College in Abbotsford, he worked as an Inventory Manager for Starline Windows until 1998, when he relocated to Tallinn, Estonia, at the age of 23.

== Career ==
In Tallinn, Block established several companies before relocating to Yemen in 2007. That same year he completed a Master of Arts in Global Leadership from Fuller School of Intercultural Studies, USA.

In 2012, he completed a Doctorate of Philosophy at the University of Exeter in the United Kingdom and moved from Yemen to the United Arab Emirates.

Block began focusing on executive coaching full-time and subsequently founded the strategy and coaching firm Paragon Consulting in 2016.

In 2017, he completed his Doctorate in Business Administration (DBA) from Monarch Business School Switzerland. He was subsequently appointed Professor of Strategic Management at the same institution.

In 2021, Block was named as the UAE’s Top Business Coach by The NYC Journal and was named Global Icon 2021 by Passion Vista. His SpartanCEO online programme was awarded Bestselling Masterclass by PassionPreneur Publishing.

In 2022, he became a member of the Forbes Coaches Council.

In 2024, Block presented two TEDx talks addressing workplace meaning and empathy: Meaning at Work and Love at Work - Empathy and Leadership.

== Publications ==
Block has published four books:

- The Qur'an in Christian-Muslim Dialogue Historical and Modern Interpretations (2013)
- Spartan CEO: Six Pillars of Executive Performance (2020)
- Business is Personal: A Blueprint for Finding Meaning at Work (2021)
- Love@Work: The Final Frontier of Empathy in Leadership (2023)
