= Benjamin Cornelius Jr. House =

Historic house in Oregon, United States

- U.S. National Register of Historic Places
- U.S. Historic district – Contributing property
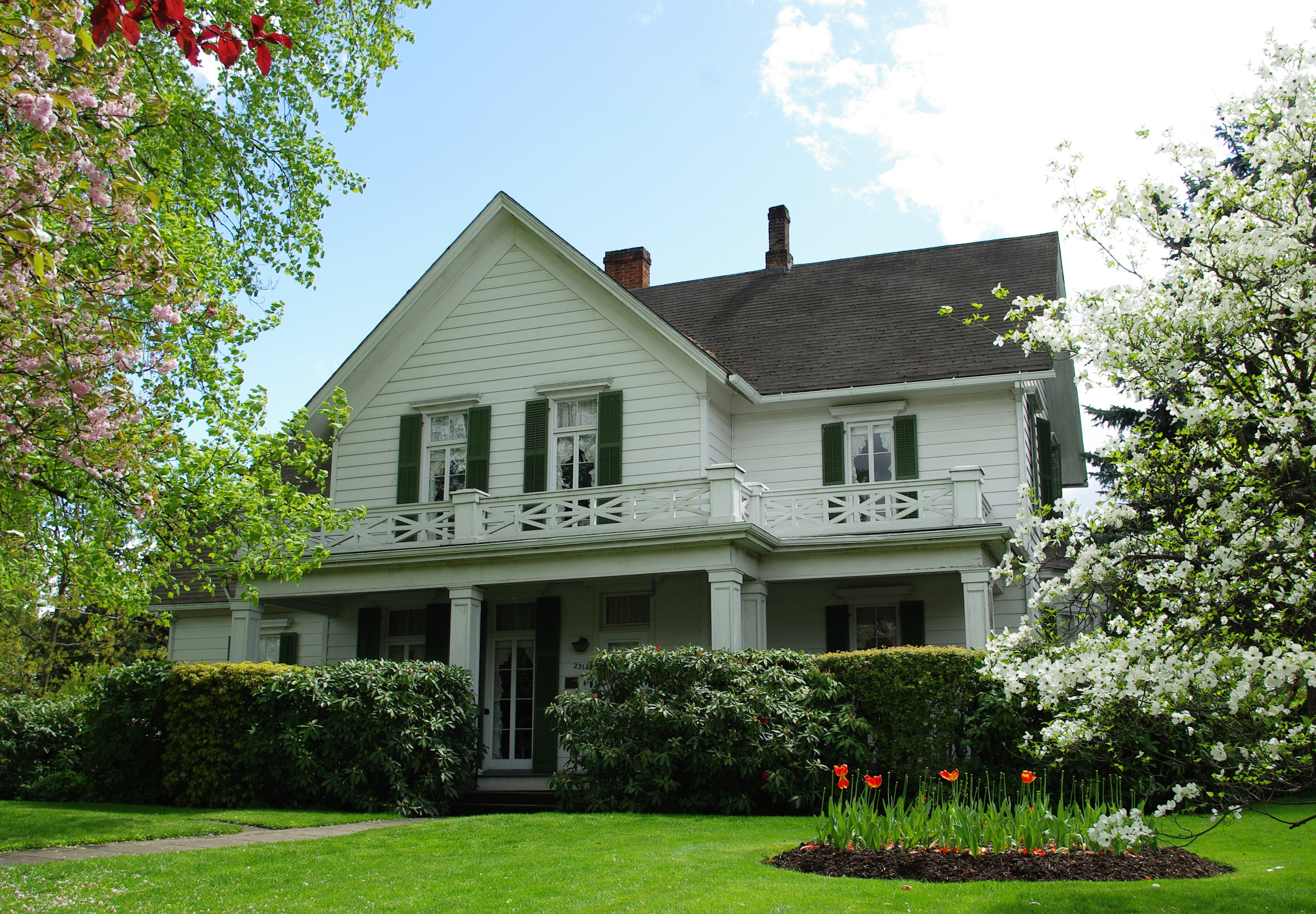
- The Cornelius House in 2009

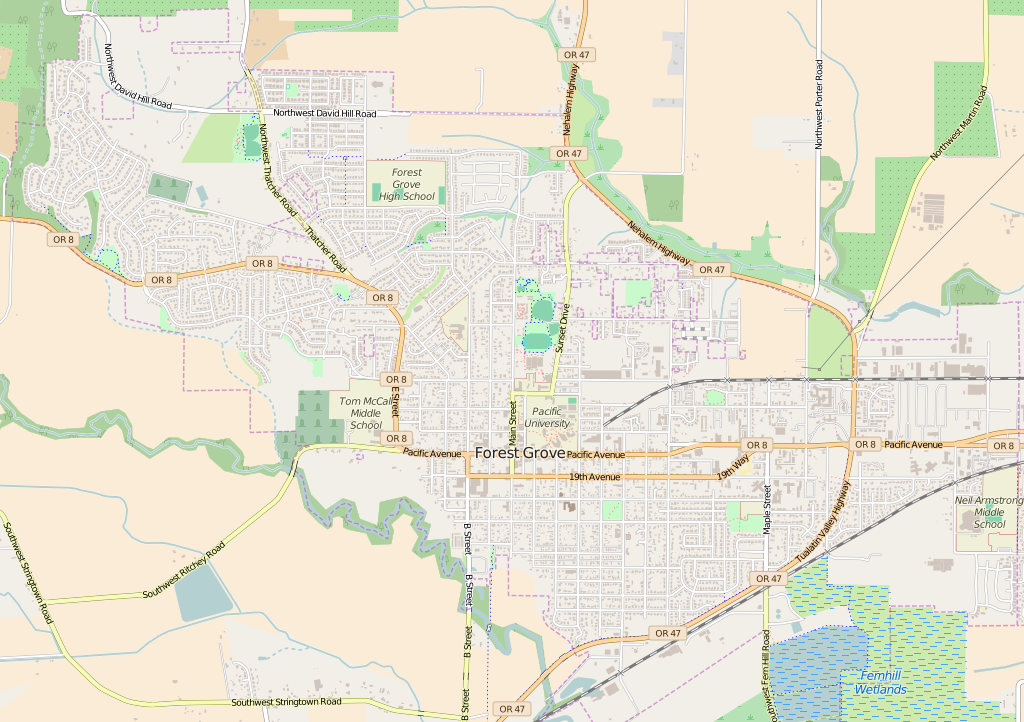
- Location within the United States Location within Oregon Location within Forest Grove OR
- Location: 2314 19th Avenue; Forest Grove, Oregon
- Coordinates: 45°31′05″N 123°06′21″W
- Built: c. 1873
- Built by: Harley McDonald
- Architect: Harley McDonald
- Architectural style: Italianate, with Colonial and Gothic details
- Part of: Clark Historic District (ID02000617)
- NRHP reference No.: 88001034
- Added to NRHP: July 14, 1988

The Benjamin Cornelius Jr. House, also known as the Benjamin Cornelius Jr. and Rachel McKinney Cornelius House, is a historic residence located in Forest Grove, Oregon, United States. It was built around 1873 by carpenter Harley McDonald, one of the first settlers to offer architectural services in Oregon, and is one of only two houses designed by McDonald remaining in Forest Grove. (Note: The other remaining home by McDonald in Forest Grove is the similar James D. Robb House.) Its Italianate form and Gothic details are highly distinctive in Forest Grove, while its veranda (added around 1900) exhibits Colonial styling. Benjamin (Note: Benjamin Cornelius Jr. was brother to Thomas R. Cornelius and uncle to Benjamin P. Cornelius.) and Rachel Cornelius, the first occupants of the house, had crossed the Oregon Trail via the Meek Cutoff in 1845; the Cornelius family was instrumental in the foundation of Hillsboro and the town of Cornelius during their lifetime, and Benjamin was also prominently involved in early real estate transactions in the area. Benjamin was murdered in 1881, during the couple's tenure at this house.

The house was added to the National Register of Historic Places in 1988, and included as part of the Clark Historic District in 2002.

== See also ==
- James D. Robb House
- National Register of Historic Places listings in Washington County, Oregon
