= Norman Cornelius =

English cricketer

Personal information
- Born: 5 June 1886; Blundellsands, Crosby, Lancashire
- Died: 21 October 1963 (aged 77); West Felton, Shropshire
- Batting: Right-handed

Domestic team information
- Years: Team
- 1910-1911: Gloucestershire
- Source: Cricinfo, 29 March 2014

Norman Cornelius (5 June 1886 – 21 October 1963) was an English cricketer. He played for Gloucestershire between 1910 and 1911.
