= Cor blimey =

Cor blimey or gorblimey may refer to:

- A British slang phrase for an exclamation of surprise
- Cor, Blimey!, a 2000 television film and a spin-off of the Carry On comedy franchise
- Gorblimey Press, founded by Barry Windsor-Smith
- "Gor blimey" cap, a type of peaked cap worn by British soldiers in the First World War

== See also ==
- "My Old Man's a Dustman" (who wears gorblimey trousers)
