= Cornelius Greenfield =

Sir Cornelius Ewen MacLean Greenfield, ID, KBE, CMG (2 May 1906 – 21 May 1980) was a Rhodesian civil servant.

Born in the Transvaal, Greenfield emigrated to Rhodesia with his parents in 1909, settling in Bulawayo. He spent most of his official career in the Rhodesian Treasury. After Rhodesia's unilateral declaration of independence in 1965, Greenfield chaired the Prime Minister's Economic Advisory Committee, and accompanied Ian Smith to the talks on HMS Tiger in 1966. He retired from the civil service that year.
