= Coral Bernadine Pollard =

Barbadian artist

Coral Bernadine Pollard (born Roberts circa 1940) is a Barbadian artist. She is known for her paintings, murals and also for her work as an art tutor for Her Majesty's Prison Dodds, a prison in Barbados. Her studio is located in Saint James.

== Life ==
Coral Bernadine Pollard was born in Bridgetown, Barbados. She attended the Christ Church Girls' Foundation School and began painting there. Her teacher, Evelyn Heath, encouraged her to pursue art, however, her father was not supportive of the idea. When Pollard was 17, she began working at Mount Gay Distilleries. She married Cornelius Pollard when she was 19 and the couple went on to have three children, though they would eventually divorce. Pollard took classes for fashion illustration at the Traphagen School of Fashion and Pollard would go on to create art professionally by age 26.

== Art career ==
Her work included graphic art, murals, and painting, though most of her early work was commercial in nature. She created the "emancipation mural" on display in the West Wing of the Parliament building and was the designer of the "national dress" of Barbados. Pollard also worked as an art tutor at Her Majesty's Prison Dodds.

Pollard was featured in a 2011 exhibition at the Barbados Museum and Historical Society exhibition celebrating women artists where she displayed her painting, Roots. Pollard's exhibition, "Power and Glory" for Barbados Day in 2015 was the precursor for the 2016 50th anniversary of independence exhibition titled "The Pride of Barbados." In 2016, she presented the Prime Minister, Freundel Stuart, with a portrait featuring him during the 50th anniversary celebration. She was honored by the National Cultural Foundation (NCF) in 2017 for her "contribution and development of art" in Bajan culture.
