= Cornelius, Kentucky =

Unincorporated community in Kentucky, United States

- Unincorporated community
- Location within Kentucky
- Coordinates: 37°18′50″N 84°00′32″W
- Country: United States
- State: Kentucky
- County: Jackson
- Elevation: 1,001 ft (305 m)
- Time zone: UTC-6 (Central (CST))
  - Summer (DST): UTC-5 (CDT)
- Area code: 606
- GNIS feature ID: 511548

Cornelius is an unincorporated community in Jackson County, Kentucky, United States.
