= Corrie Cameron =

New Zealand artist and printmaker

Hinehauone Coralie Cook
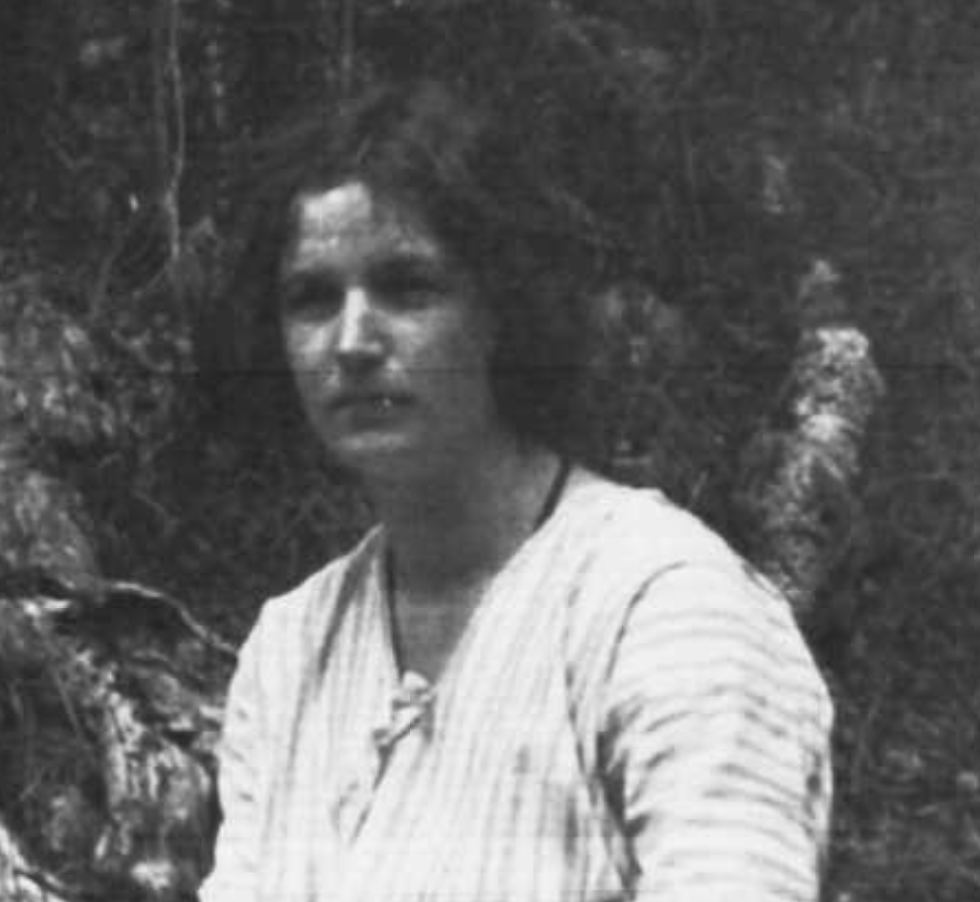
- Born: Hinehauone Coralie Cameron; 14 February 1904; Masterton, New Zealand
- Died: 7 June 1993 (aged 89); Masterton, New Zealand
- Known for: Printmaking
- Spouse: George Pilkington Cook (m. 1940; died 1973)

Hinehauone Coralie Cook (née Cameron; 14 February 1904 – 7 June 1993), known as Corrie Cameron, was a New Zealand printmaker and watercolorist. Her works are held at New Zealand's National Museum Te Papa and in the National Library of New Zealand. She is regarded as being one of New Zealand's least recognised printmakers of the 1930s.

== Biography ==
Cook was born at Te Ore Ore near Masterton on 14 February 1904 to Madeline Cameron and her husband Walter and named Hinehauone Coralie Cameron. She began her art education with Miss Beard in Masterton and then went on to be educated at Wellington Technical College. She was tutored by Mary Elizabeth Tripe in oil painting, by Harry Linley Richardson in drawing and by Dorothy Kate Richmond in water colour painting. Her art education in Wellington lasted from 1924 until 1928.

She travelled with her friend Helen Blair to France and to the United Kingdom in 1928. There they both studied at the Heatherley School of Fine Art and the Central School of Art and Design. On returning to New Zealand in 1930 Cook applied herself to her art, concentrating mainly on printmaking and exhibiting at the New Zealand Academy of Fine Arts, the Auckland Society of Arts and the Otago Arts Society. In June 1940 she married the Anglican minister and widower George Pilkington Cook, who was father to six children. She and George would go on to have a further three children. Her parenting responsibilities impacted her art practice for over twenty years. However, from the mid-1960s Cook was able to return to producing art and was an active member of the Masterton Art Club and exhibited again at the Academy of Fine Arts.

In the early 1990s, she moved to a retirement home in Masterton and on 7 June 1993 she died at Masterton Hospital, having been predeceased by her husband in 1973.
