= Cor bovinum =

Massive hypertrophy of the left ventricle of the heart due to volume overload

- Other names: Cor bovis
- Specialty: Cardiology

Cor bovinum or cor bovis refers to a massive hypertrophy of the left ventricle of the heart due to volume overload, usually in earlier times in the context of tertiary syphilis but currently more often due to chronic aortic regurgitation, hypertensive and ischaemic heart disease.

== Pathophysiology ==
Due to syphilitic aortitis (a complication of tertiary syphilis) the aortic valve ring becomes dilated. The free margins of valve cusps no longer approximate leading to aortic valve insufficiency. As blood regurgitates into the left ventricle between each systole, volume overload ensues and the ventricular wall hypertrophies in an attempt to maintain cardiac output and blood pressure. The massive ventricle can lead to a heart weighing over 1000 grams (the weight of a normal heart is about 350 grams), referred to as cor bovinum (Latin for cow's heart).

Fluri and Gebbers define cor bovinum as a heart exceeding 500 g in weight. Looking through autopsies on Internal Medicine patients at the Kantonsspital Luzern, they found 415 cases out of 1181 autopsies in the two periods 1978-81 and 1997–2000. Cor bovinum was found in 25.3% of cases in the earlier period, with mean age at death 67.7 years, and in the later period 20.6% with mean age 74.3 years. The male female ratio was 4:1. "In 93% of all patients with CB, we found coronary atherosclerosis as a sign of high blood pressure and in 79% a COPD."

In 84% of cases the cause of death was directly related to the cor bovinum, but in 37% the cause of death was still unclear. They concluded that cor bovinum was a decreasing but still frequent autopsy finding. High blood pressure, COPD and male sex were the main risk factors. The decreasing incidence was ascribed to improved medical management: they mention treatments for high blood pressure and coronary artery disease, which suggests that "COPD" in their abstract refers to the latter.

== Terminology ==
A Medline search in January 2008 of articles published since 1950 revealed seven articles on "cor bovinum" (in the earlier part of this period only the titles could be searched), of which only one was in English. A search for dictionary-reported synonyms revealed no mention of "bucardia," and all 101 articles mentioning "ox heart" related to oxen.

== See also ==
- Cardiomegaly
- Left ventricular hypertrophy
- Syphilitic aortitis
- Ventricular hypertrophy
