= Coral Herrera =

Spanish feminist writer and communicator

- In a 2014 interview
- Born: Coral Herrera Gómez; 1977 (age 48–49); Madrid, Spain
- Citizenship: Costa Rica
- Occupations: Writer; teacher

Coral Herrera Gómez (born 1977) is a Spanish feminist writer and communicator based in Costa Rica, known for her critique of the concept of romantic love and her contributions to queer studies.

== Education ==
Coral Herrera holds a degree in Humanities and Audiovisual Communication from the Universidad Carlos III in Madrid. She received her doctorate in Humanities and Communication from the same university with a thesis on romantic love in the West and its relation to capitalism, patriarchy and democracy. She examined the sociocultural construction of reality, gender and romantic love; how the West builds emotions through symbols, myths and rites; and how romantic love perpetuates capitalism, patriarchy and democracies.

== Literary works ==
After finishing her doctorate (and due to the 2008 Spanish economic crisis), Gomez settled down in Costa Rica after a stay in Paris. She has published articles in different media outlets such as Pikara Magazine, El País, eldiario.es, and El Ciudadano, and has collaborated on programs such as La Tuerka.

The main theme of her work is the critique of romantic love from a gender and queer perspective. She argues that romanticism is a product of patriarchy and that it plays a fundamental role in the binary and hierarchical construction of gender inequality. Furthermore, she states that there are different ways of understanding and experiencing love that are more liberating and satisfying than traditional ones.

== Published books ==
- Más allá de las etiquetas: hombres, mujeres y trans (2010).
- La construcción sociocultural del amor romántico (2011).
- Bodas Diversas y Amores Queer (2013).
- Bodas reales, bodas patriarcales: análisis queer de la boda de los príncipes de Asturias (2014).
