= Courtland (name) =

Courtland is a surname and given name which may refer to:

- Courtland Bullard (born 1978), American former National Football League player
- Courtland C. Gillen (1880–1954), American politician and lawyer
- Courtland Guillory (born 2006), American football player
- Courtland C. Matson (1841–1915), American politician, lawyer and colonel in the American Civil War
- Courtland Mead (born 1987), American actor
- Courtland Sutton (born 1995), American football player
- Courtland Winn (1863–1940), American politician and lawyer, mayor of Atlanta, Georgia
- Jerome Courtland (1926–2012), American actor, director and producer
- Karen Courtland (born 1970), American retired pair skater

== See also ==
- Cortland Finnegan (born 1984), American retired National Football League player
- Cortland Fitzsimmons (1893–1949), American writer, screenwriter, and author of crime fiction
