= Cornelio Da Montalcino =

Cornelio Da Montalcino was a Franciscan friar who had embraced Judaism, and was burned alive on the Campo dei Fiori in Rome, Italy, in 1554.
