= Coralie =

- Pronunciation: Cora-lee
- Gender: female

Origin
- Origin: French
- Meaning: "coral reef"

Other names
- Related names: Coral, Coraline

Coralie is a French female given name meaning "coral", derived from the Latin word coralium. It was the eighth most popular name for baby girls in Quebec in 2007.

Notable people with the name include:

- Coralie Balmy (born 1987), French swimmer
- Coralie Blythe (1881–1928), English actress and singer born Caroline Maud Blyth
- Coralie Clément (born 1978), French singer
- Coralie van den Cruyce (1796–1858), Belgian writer, feminist and poet
- Coralie Franklin Cook (1861–1942), African-American educator, public speaker and government official
- Coralie Demay (born 1992), French racing cyclist
- Coralie Demers (born 2010), Canadian artistic gymnast
- Coralie Dubost (born 1983), French jurist and politician
- Coralie Fargeat (born 1976), French film director and screenwriter
- Coralie Lassource (born 1992), French handball player
- Coralie O'Connor (1934–2019), American swimmer
- Coralie Clarke Rees (1908–1972), Australian author
- Coralie Simmons (born 1977), American water polo player
- Coralie Frasse Sombet (born 1999), French alpine ski racer
- Coralie Winn, urban arts director

== See also ==
- Coralee, another given name
