= Wade Cornelius =

New Zealand cricketer (born 1978)

Personal information
- Full name: Wade Alfred Cornelius
- Born: 5 March 1978 (age 48); Christchurch, New Zealand
- Relatives: Cleighten Cornelius (brother)
- Source: Cricinfo, 15 October 2020

Wade Alfred Cornelius (born 5 March 1978) is a New Zealand cricketer. He played in fourteen first-class matches for Canterbury from 2000 to 2004.

== See also ==
- List of Canterbury representative cricketers
