= Cornelius House (Mooresville, North Carolina) =

Historic house in North Carolina, United States

- U.S. National Register of Historic Places
- Location within North Carolina Location within the United States
- Location: SR 1378 and SR 1302, near Mooresville, North Carolina
- Coordinates: 35°37′46″N 80°52′13″W
- Area: 33 acres (13 ha)
- Built: c. 1825
- Architectural style: Federal
- MPS: Iredell County MRA
- NRHP reference No.: 80002860
- Added to NRHP: November 24, 1980

Cornelius House is a historic home located near Mooresville, Iredell County, North Carolina. The house was built about 1825, and is a tripartite Federal style, T-shaped frame dwelling with a two-story central section flanked by one-story wings. It has a gable roof, fieldstone foundation, and a single shouldered brick end chimneys.

It was added to the National Register of Historic Places in 1980.
