= Coraline (given name) =

First name

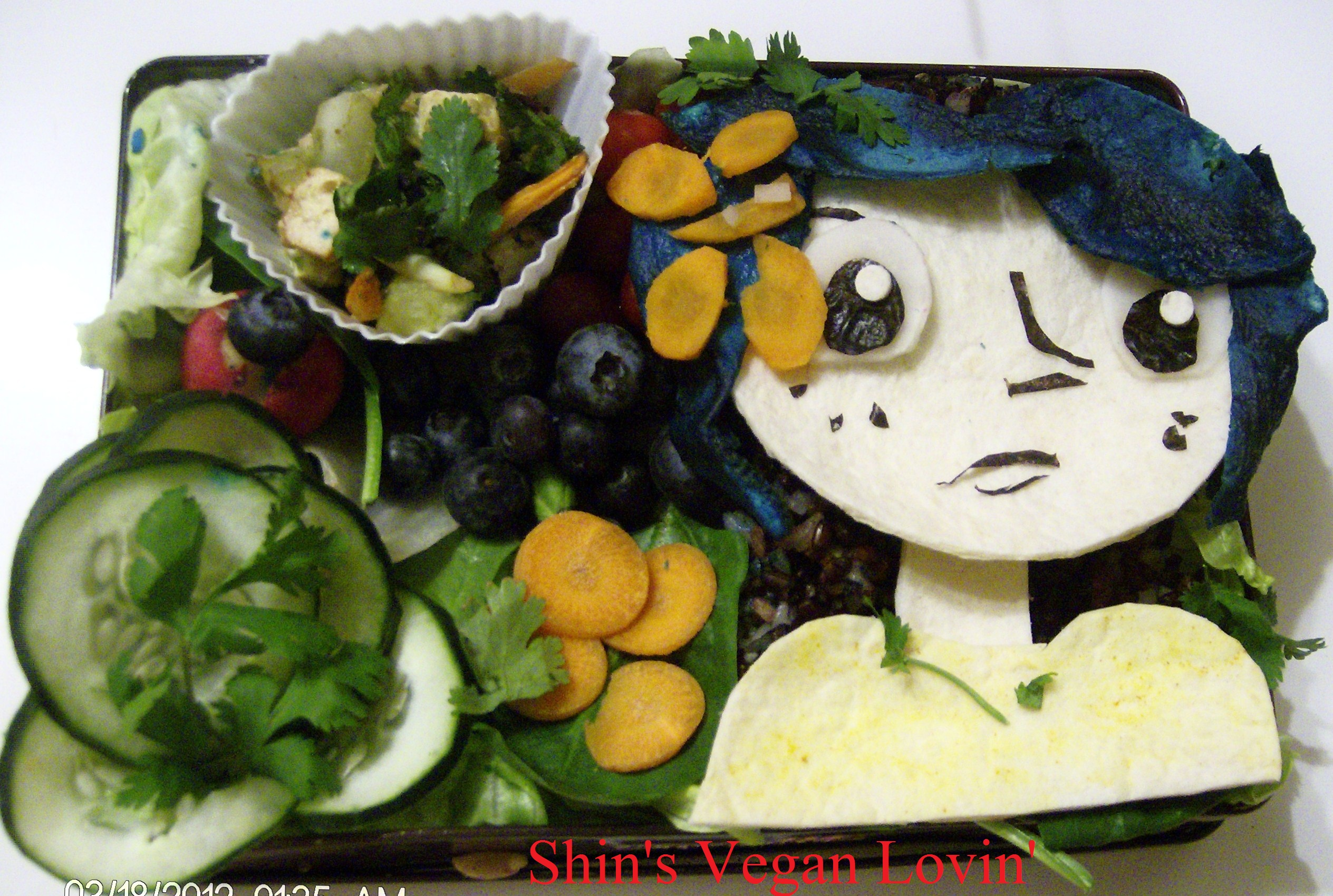
- A bento box portrayal of the main character of Neil Gaiman’s Coraline.
- Pronunciation: (/ˈkɒrəliːn/) or (/ˈkɒrəlaɪn/)
- Gender: Feminine
- Language: English

Origin
- Meaning: Coral

Other names
- Related names: Caroline, Cora, Coral, Coralie

Coraline is a feminine given name, usually considered a French diminutive of the name Coral, which is derived from the name for the precious coral used to make jewelry. It was first used by French composer Adolphe Adam for a character in his 1849 comic opera Le toréador. As a diminutive of Coral, the name is traditionally pronounced with an een ending. It might also be a diminutive of the name Cora. Coraline is also a name for a red, pink, or orange shade of the color coral. Author Neil Gaiman believed that he had invented the name as a rhyming variant of the name Caroline for the title character in his dark fantasy horror children's novella Coraline. Gaiman pronounced the name of the character with a long i to rhyme with the word wine. Gaiman also liked the name's resemblance to the word coral, which he explained is "both beautiful and hard and hidden." He also later found the name had been used for a tragic heroine in a Victorian-era song as well as for a type of material used to make corsets.

== Usage ==
The name was among the top 500 names in use for newborn girls in France between 1976 and 2007. It has been among the top 1,000 names for newborn girls in the United States since 2012. Usage of the name for American newborn girls has increased in recent years. The name has not been among the top 1,000 names for girls in Canada. In 2021, it was used for 15 newborn girls in that country.

== People ==
- Coraline Ada Ehmke, American software developer and open source advocate
- Coraline Hugue (born 1984), French cross country skier who competed at the 2018 Winter Olympics
- Coraline Vitalis (born 1995), French fencer who competed in the 2020 and 2024 Summer Olympics
