= Bernard Cornelius =

English cricketer

Bernard William Cornelius (16 March 1919 – 26 August 1987) was an English cricketer who played for Northamptonshire. He was born in Northampton and died in Towcester.

Cornelius made a single first-class appearance, during the 1947 season, against Leicestershire. Coming in at number 3, he scored a duck in the first innings in which he batted, and 9 runs in the second innings. Northamptonshire won the match by 6 wickets but Cornelius never played again.
