= Cor Jesu =

Cor Jesu may refer to:

- Cor Jesu College
- Cor Jesu Academy
- Sacred Heart of Jesus
