= Cleighten Cornelius =

New Zealand cricketer (1976–2026)

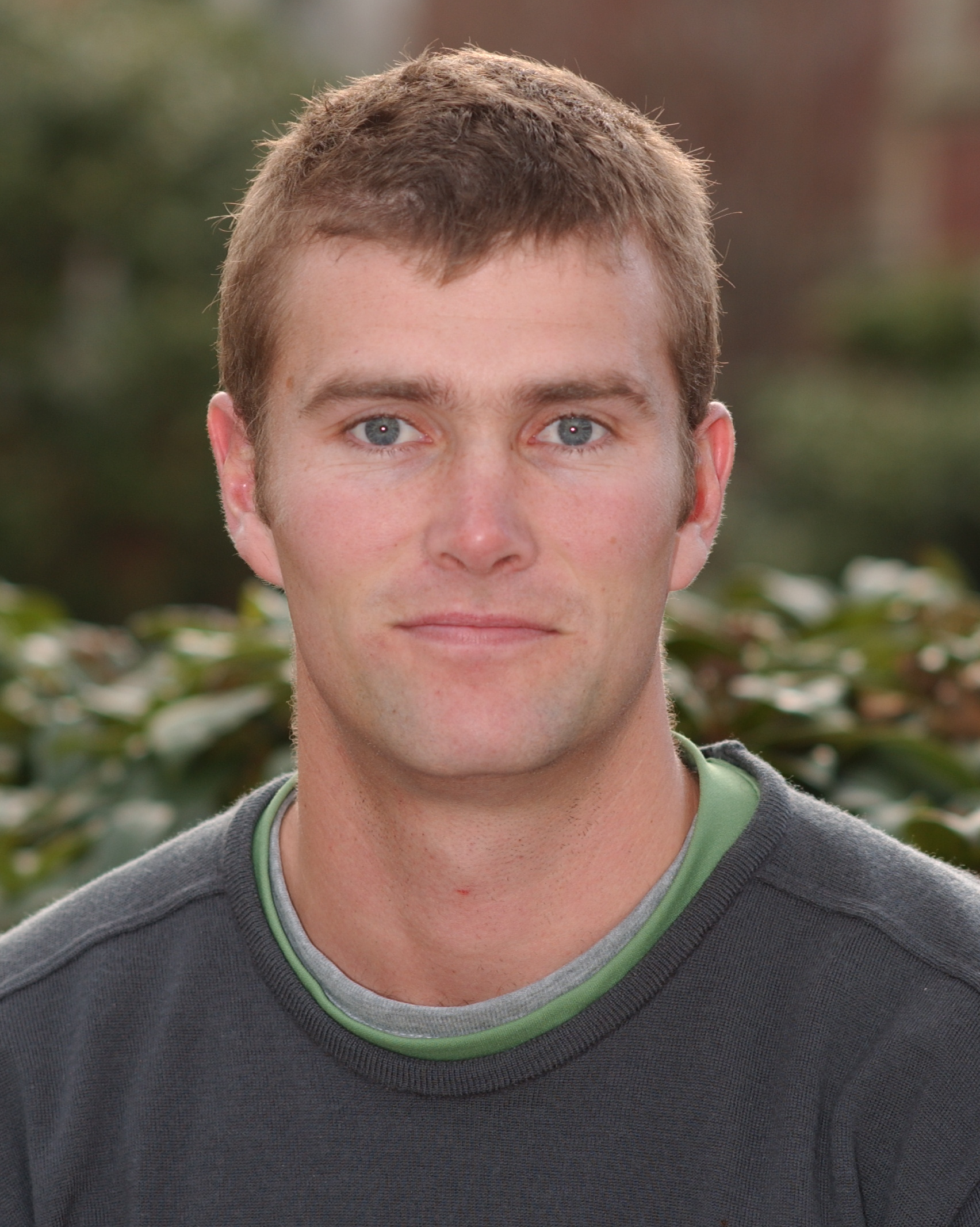
- Cornelius in 2003

Personal information
- Full name: Cleighten James Cornelius
- Born: 2 June 1976; Christchurch, New Zealand
- Died: 11 April 2026 (aged 49); Blenheim, New Zealand
- Relatives: Wade Cornelius (brother)
- Source: Cricinfo, 15 October 2020

Cleighten James Cornelius (2 June 1976 – 11 April 2026) was a New Zealand cricketer and winemaker. He played in three first-class, and ten List A matches for Canterbury from 2001 to 2005.

== Biography ==
Cornelius was born in Christchurch on 2 June 1976, the son of Leonie (née Waddell) and Jim Cornelius. He was educated at St Bede's College, where he played in the school's 1st XI cricket team. Cornelius studied at Lincoln University, graduating in 2004 with a Bachelor of Viticulture and Oenology degree, and went on to become the winemaker at Mud House in Marlborough.

Cornelius died from myeloma in Blenheim, on 11 April 2026, at the age of 49, having been diagnosed with the condition in late 2025.

== See also ==
- List of Canterbury representative cricketers
