= Estadio Cornelio Santos =

Coordinates: 14.54767°N 86.65429°W

Estadio Cornelio Santos is a football stadium in Campamento, Honduras. It is used for football matches and was the temporary home stadium of Atlético Olanchano for the Apertura 2007 season while their home stadium Ruben Guifarro was under renovations. The stadium holds 2,000 people.
