= Peter Cornelius (disambiguation) =

Peter Cornelius (1824–1874) was a German composer.

Peter Cornelius may also refer to:

- Pieter Corneliszoon Plockhoy (c. 1625–c. 1664/70), Dutch Mennonite who founded a settlement in Delaware, USA
- Peter von Cornelius (1783–1867), German painter
- Peter Cornelius (opera singer) (fl. 1892–1922), Danish opera singer
- Peter Cornelius (photographer) (1913–1970), German photographer and photojournalist
- Peter Cornelius (singer-songwriter) (born 1951), Austrian singer-songwriter of Austropop, guitarist, and a former member of Enigma
