= Coral Aguirre =

Argentinian writer (born 1938)

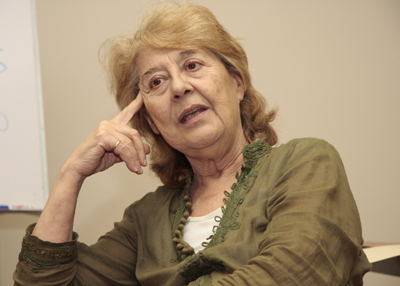
- Born: Angélica Claro Canteros; July 7, 1938 (age 88); Bahía Blanca, Argentina
- Occupations: Playwright, musician, educator
- Partner: Dardo Aguirre (died 2013)

Angélica Claro Canteros (born July 7, 1938), known by the penname Coral Aguirre, is a playwright, musician, and professor of literature and acting. Originally from Argentina, she is a nationalized Mexican citizen. She has been a member of the Bahía Blanca Symphony Orchestra in Argentina and the Turin Opera Orchestra in Italy. She has published articles and essays on theatrical, literary, historical, and anthropological subjects in countries such as Argentina, Cuba, the United States, and Mexico.

== Biography ==
Angélica Claro Canteros was born in Bahía Blanca, Argentina on July 7, 1938. Her father registered her given name as Angélica, despite her mother's wishes that she be named Coral after her grandmother. In childhood, she was attracted to the arts by the influence of her mother and her magazines. She studied violin, piano, and viola, an instrument that she played in the Bahía Blanca Symphony Orchestra. She was introduced to theater during a dramatic art class at the same school where she learned viola. This allowed her to obtain a scholarship to study in Buenos Aires.

In 1964 she began a romantic relationship with Dardo Aguirre, who played violin in the same orchestra, and whose surname she adopted to create her pseudonym as a writer. Together they presided over Teatro Alianza from 1966 to 1978, a group that presented collective creations exposing political problems of the time. In 1977 they presented Coral's first play, Silencio-hospital. During the performance, several members of the troupe were arrested, including Coral and Dardo. Coral was imprisoned for a month, during which she was subjected to a mock execution. It was thanks to pressure from the art community and newspapers that she and Dardo regained their freedom, while others were never heard from again.

They spent time in exile in Europe, and in 1981 they returned to Argentina, where they remained in hiding for a time. The threats they experienced there led them to migrate to Mexico. She later reflected,

There (Argentina) is the horror, here (Mexico) is the joy. [...] There is love – of course I love her – but Mexico too, maybe more, I don't know. The measure of love is a mystery.

She lived in Mexico City for five years, and in 1994 she moved to Monterrey, Nuevo León to work at Televisa's drama school. Her pedagogical vocation led her to teach Greco-Latin literature at the Autonomous University of Nuevo León (UANL), the same university where she serves as coordinator of the Theater School. Aguirre continued to write and direct theater in Monterrey, presenting plays such as Juegos a la hora de la siesta, El atentado, and Yepeto y Ardiente paciencia. She mainly writes articles and essays of a theatrical, literary, historical, and anthropological nature. Her works are published in anthologies, cultural weeklies, and culture magazines. She is also the general director and writer for Levadura magazine, a laboratory-type publication for cultural, political, and social reflection. She has taught essay workshops for the UANL Publishing House and the Casa Universitaria del Libro. She also taught the Semiotics of the Show module within the Theater Criticism program organized by the Council for Culture and the Arts of Nuevo León (CONARTE).

In 2020, she served as a juror for the Alfonso Reyes International Prize.

In 2021, she was selected as coordinator of the Writers Center of Nuevo León, a CONARTE program to stimulate and promote the development of literary creation.

== Awards ==
- Argentine National Playwright Award, 1987
- Film Screenplay Award from UNAM and the Institute of the Mexican Revolution, 1993
- Argentine National Playwright Award, 1997
- Finalist for the Nuevo León Literature Award, 2003
- Nuevo León Literature Award, 2007
- UANL Arts Award, 2009
- Theater XXI Award, 2012
- UANL Civil College Recognition of Artistic Merit, 2020

== Works ==
- La Cruz en el espejo, dramatic piece in two acts, 1988
- Silencio-hospital, 1988
- Teatro breve nuevoleonés, for theater students and workshops, 1999
- Apuntes para un diagnóstico cultural del sur de Nuevo León, 2000
- Los niños de Nuevo León y el fuego de Prometeo, 2001
- Contraseña: nueva dramaturgia regiomontana, 2003
- Teatro del Norte 4, 2003
- Larga distancia, 2004
- La Pasión del diablo: una visión enamorada, 2004
- Andar por la tierra, 2011
- Dónde vas Alfonso Reyes (in Spanish). UANL. 2021. ISBN 9786072714830 – via Google Books.
