= Corneliu =

Corneliu is a Romanian given name, derived from Latin Cornelius. Corneliu may refer to:

- Corneliu Baba
- Corneliu Bogdan
- Corneliu Calotescu
- Corneliu Carp
- Corneliu Chisu
- Corneliu Ciontu
- Corneliu Zelea Codreanu
- Corneliu Codreanu (footballer)
- Corneliu Coposu
- Corneliu Dragalina
- Corneliu E. Giurgea
- Corneliu Ion
- Corneliu Ionescu
- Corneliu Mănescu
- Corneliu Moldovanu
- Corneliu Olar
- Corneliu Oros
- Corneliu Papură
- Corneliu M. Popescu
- Corneliu Porumboiu
- Corneliu Robe
- Corneliu Stroe
- Corneliu Șumuleanu
- Corneliu Teodorini
- Corneliu Vadim Tudor
