= Corrie Artman =

American football player (1907–1970)

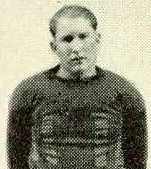

No. 10, 44
- Position: Tackle / Guard

Personal information
- Born: January 8, 1907; Santa Monica, California, U.S.
- Died: March 9, 1970 (aged 63); Long Beach, California, U.S.
- Listed height: 6 ft 2 in (1.88 m)
- Listed weight: 238 lb (108 kg)

Career information
- High school: Long Beach (CA) Polytechnic
- College: Stanford

Career history
- New York Giants (1931); Boston Braves (1932); Pittsburgh Pirates (1933)
- Stats at Pro Football Reference

Corwin Walter Artman (January 8, 1907 – March 9, 1970) was an American professional football lineman in the National Football League (NFL) for the New York Giants, Boston Braves, and Pittsburgh Pirates. He played college football at Stanford University.

== Early life ==
Artman was born on January 8, 1907 in Santa Monica, California. He and his family resided in Los Angeles, California for much of Artman's youth at 1447 Bonnie Brae Street. Altman's family has ties to Pennsylvania via his mother, Blanche, as well as India via his father, Walter, who was born in British occupied India.

At Long Beach Polytechnic High School, Artman was involved on the school's football team, mainly as a lineman. His biography in his senior yearbook simply states he planned on attending college. He graduated from Long Beach with the class of 1925.

== Career ==
In the fall of 1925, Artman began attending Stanford University as a freshman. While in attendance, he began to play on the school's football team as a tackle. His imposing a size of six-feet two-inches tall made him valuable to teams within the recently formed National Football League. He was signed to the New York Giants to play in the 1931 season. He appeared in every game for the Giants that season, rotating as a guard and tackle on the line. He then signed with the Boston Redskins for their inaugural 1932 team, where he again appeared in every game. His final stop was in Pittsburgh under head coach Forrest Douds, as a guard/tackle with the Pittsburgh Steelers, known then as the "Pirates". He retired having appeared in 23 games and playing for three different teams, two being inaugural rosters.

== Later life and death ==
He returned to the Los Angeles area following his exit from the NFL. As of 1954, Artman was living at 6515 E. Seaside Walk.

Artman died in his hometown of Long Beach on March 9, 1970.
