= St. Cornelius =

Saint Cornelius is the name of the following saints and persons in the previous stages of liturgical veneration:

- Pope Cornelius (in office: 251–253)
- Cornelius of Armagh (d. 1175)

May 19 (Eastern Orthodox liturgics)

- Venerable Cornelius of Komel (Vologda), abbot (1537)
- Saint Cornelius of Paleostrov, abbot (15th century)

July 22 (Eastern Orthodox liturgics)

- Saint Cornelius of Pereyaslavl, monk (1693)

September 13 (Eastern Orthodox liturgics)

- Hieromartyr Cornelius the Centurion (1st century)
- Saint Cornelius of Padan-Olonets and with him Saints Dionysius and Misail

List of Patriarchs of Antioch

- St. Ignatius the Illuminator (68–107)
- Saint Cornelius (127–154)
