= Metropolitan Cornelius =

Metropolitan Cornelius may refer to:

- Cornelius (Jakobs)
- Cornelius (Rodousakis)
- Cornelius (Titov)
