= George Cornelius (politician) =

American politician in Pennsylvania

George E. Cornelius is a former Secretary of the Pennsylvania Department of Community and Economic Development.
