= Cornelia (given name) =

- Gender: Female

Other names
- Variant forms: Nel, Lia, Nelia, Nelly, Conny, Connie
- Related names: Cornelius or Cornelis, Kornelia, Kornélia

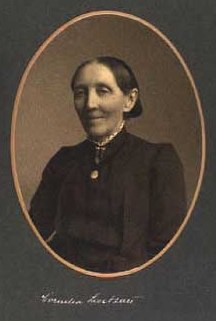
Cornelia Frederikke Juliane Victorine von Levetzow (1836–1921), Danish writer and noblewoman

Cornelia is a feminine given name. It is a feminine form of the name Cornelius or Cornelis. Nel, Nele, Nelly, Corey, Cornie, Lia, or Nelia can be used as a shortened version of Cornelia. Conny, Connie, Nele, or Neele are popular German short forms used in their own right. Lia and Corrie are diminutive versions of the Dutch name.

It also has the alternate spellings of Kornelia, Korneliya, and Cornélia.

== Origin ==
In ancient Rome, Cornelia was the nomen gentilicium of women born into the gens Cornelia. This gens was widespread and some notable members of it include; Cornelia Africana (mother of the Gracchi brothers), Cornelia (first wife of Julius Caesar) and Cornelia Salonina (Roman empress as the wife of Gallienus).

== Women with the name ==
- Cornelia Adair (1837–1921), American rancher
- Cornelia Storrs Adair (1884–1962), American educator
- Cornelia Adrichomia, 16th-century Dutch poet and nun
- Cornelia Armsby (1884–1969), American golfer and socialite
- Cornelia Bargmann (born 1961), American neurobiologist
- Cornelia van Bentum (born 1965), Dutch swimmer
- Cornelia Bernoulli (born 1954), Swiss actress
- Cornelia ten Boom (1892–1983), Dutch World War II resistance member
- Cornelia Bouhon (1757–1823), Dutch actress, singer, dancer
- Cornelia Bouman (1903–1998), Dutch tennis player
- Cornelia Bürki (born 1953), Swiss long-distance runner
- Cornelia Brandolini d'Adda (born 1979), Italian fashion director
- Cornelia Clapp (1849–1934), American zoologist and marine biologist
- Cornelia Denz (born 1963), German physicist
- Cornelia Ebert (born 1976), German linguist
- Cornelia Hubertina "Neel" Doff (1858–1942), Dutch-Belgian writer
- Cornelia Dow (1842–1905), American philanthropist, temperance activist
- Cornelia Druțu, Romanian mathematician
- Cornelia Dumler (born 1982), German volleyball player
- Cornelia Ecker (born 1976), Austrian politician
- Cornelia Elgood (1874–1960), British physician
- Cornelia Emilian (1840–1910), Romanian women's activist
- Cornelia Keeble Ewing (1898–1973), American clubwoman
- Cornelia Fabri (1869–1915), Italian mathematician
- Cornelia Cole Fairbanks (1852–1913), Second Lady of the United States
- Cornelia Flores (born 1962), Bolivian politician
- Cornelia Frances (1941–2018), English-Australian actress
- Cornelia Froboess (born 1943), German actress and singer
- Cornelia Füeg (born 1941), Swiss politician
- Cornelia Funke (born 1958), German children's writer
- Cornelia Ghijben (1733–1790), Dutch actress and singer
- Cornelia Gillyard (born 1941), American organic chemist
- Cornelia Deaderick Glenn (1854–1926), First Lady of North Carolina
- Cornelia Nycke Groot (born 1988), Dutch handball player
- Cornelia Gröschel (born 1987), German actress
- Cornelia Hanisch (born 1952), German fencer
- Cornelia Hermina van Harreveld-Lako (1883–1945), Dutch botanist
- Cornelia Loomis Hull (1904–2001), American philanthropist
- Cornelia Collins Hussey (1827–1902), American philanthropist and writer
- Cornelia Hütter (born 1992), Austrian alpine skier
- Cornelia Jakobs (born 1992), Swedish singer
- Cornelia Hall Jones (1842–1911), Hawaiian philanthropist
- Cornelia Jane Matthews Jordan (1830–1898), American poet and lyricist
- Cornelia Knight (1757–1837), English gentlewoman, traveller, landscape artist and writer
- Cornelia Laddé (1915–1996), Dutch swimmer
- Cornelia Catharina de Lange (1871–1950), Dutch pediatrician
- Cornelia Lister (born 1994), Swedish tennis player
- Cornelia van Marle (1661–1699), Dutch painter
- Cornelia F. Maury (1866–1942), American pastel artist
- Cornelia van Meijgaard (1913–2010), Dutch actress and singer, better known as Conny Stuart
- Cornelia van der Mijn (1709–1782), Dutch lower painter
- Cornelia van Nieuwenhuizen-Wijbenga (born 1963), Dutch politician
- Cornelia van Nijenroode (1629–c.1692), Dutch merchant
- Cornelia Alice Norris (1857–1935), American socialite and genealogist
- Cornelia Oschkenat (born 1961), East German hurdler
- Cornelia Parker (born 1956), British artist
- Cornelia Pieper (born 1959), German politician
- Cornelia Polit (born 1963), East German backstroke swimmer
- Cornelia Pröll (born 1961), Austrian alpine skier
- Cornelia Bentley Sage Quinton (1876–1936), American painter
- Cornelia Holroyd Bradley Richards (1899–1892), American author
- Cornelia de Rijck (1653–1726), Dutch painter
- Cornelia Scheffer (1769–1839), Dutch painter
- Cornélia Scheffer (1830–1899), French designer and sculptor
- Cornelia Schlosser (1750–1777), sister of Johann von Goethe
- Cornelia Schmachtenberg (born 1991), German politician
- Cornelia Sharpe (born 1943), American former actress and model
- Cornelia Otis Skinner (1899–1979), American actress, humorist, and playwright
- Cornelia Sollfrank (born 1960), German digital artist
- Cornelia Sorabji (1866–1954), Indian lawyer, social reformer and writer
- Cornelia Laws St. John (died 1902), American poet
- Cornelia Ștefănescu (1928–2010), Romanian literary critic and historian
- Cornelia Branch Stone (1840–1925), American clubwoman and suffragist
- Cornelia Strong (1877–1955), American mathematician and astronomer
- Cornelia Tăutu (1938–2019), Romanian composer
- Cornelia Toppen (1730–1800), Dutch Orangist
- Cornelia Ulrich (born 1967), German-American epidemiologist
- Cornelia van der Veer (1639–?), Dutch poet
- Cornelia Wallace (1939–2009), First Lady of Alabama
- Cornelia Walter (1815–1898), American newspaper editor
- Cornelia Warren (1857–1921), American farmer and educational and social service philanthropist
- Cornelia Weihe (born 1959), German painter and sculptor
- Cornelia Wibmer (born 1979), Austrian para-cyclist
- Cornelia Wieman (born 1964), Canadian psychiatrist
- Cornelia B. Wilbur (1908–1992), American psychiatrist
- Cornelia Willius-Senzer (born 1943), German dance instructor and politician
- Cornelia Guest, Baroness Wimborne (1847–1927), British aristocrat
- Cornelia Woll, German–French political economist
- Cornelia Wood (1892-1985), Canadian politician
- Cornelia van Wulfschkercke (died 1540), Flemish artist
- Cornelia Wulkopf (born 1952), German opera singer
- Cornelia Wyngaarden (born 1942), Canadian artist
- Cornelia van Zanten (1855–1946), Dutch opera singer

== Fictional characters ==
- Cornelia Hale, the Guardian of Earth in the W.I.T.C.H. comics and TV series
- Blair Cornelia Waldorf, a fictional character in the TV-series Gossip Girl
- Cornelia li Britannia, a fictional character in the anime series Code Geass
- Cornelia Arnim, a royal mage and a major antagonist in Fire Emblem: Three Houses and Fire Emblem Warriors: Three Hopes
- Cornelia Elliot née Bryant, a fictional character in the book series Anne of Green Gables

== See also ==
- Cornelia (disambiguation)
