= Kornél =

Kornél or Kornel is a given name and a surname. Notable people with the name include:

- Kornél Ábrányi (1822–1903), Hungarian pianist, music writer, theorist, composer
- Kornél Bardóczky (born 1978), retired professional tennis player from Hungary
- Kornél Béke (born 1998), Hungarian canoeist
- Kornél Csernik (born 1998), Hungarian football player
- Kornél Dávid (born 1971), retired Hungarian professional basketball player
- Kornel Filipowicz (1913–1990), Polish novelist, poet and screenwriter
- Kornél Havasi (1892–1945), Jewish-Hungarian chess master
- Kornel Hoffmann (born 1881), Austrian footballer
- Kornél Késmárki (1903–1965), Hungarian athlete
- Kornél Khiesz (born 1992), Hungarian professional footballer
- Karl-Ferdinand Kornel (1882–1953), Estonian jurist, journalist, diplomat and politician
- Lukács Kornél (born 1991), Hungarian rally and rallycross driver
- Kornél Kulcsár (born 1991), Hungarian football player
- Kornel Lanczos (1893–1974), Hungarian mathematician and physicist
- Kornel Makuszyński (1884–1953), Polish writer of children's and youth literature
- Kornél Marosvári (1943–2016), Hungarian sports shooter
- Kornél Molnár (born 1933), Hungarian boxer
- Kornel Morawiecki (1941–2019), Polish politician, founder and leader of Fighting Solidarity
- Kornél Mundruczó (born 1975), Hungarian film and theatre director
- Kornél Nagy (born 1986), Hungarian handball player
- Kornel Osyra (born 1993), Polish professional footballer
- Kornél Oszlányi (1893–1960), Hungarian military officer, division commander during World War II
- Kornél Pajor (1923–2016), Hungarian speed skating World Champion
- Kornel Saláta (born 1985), Slovak professional football
- Kornél Sámuel (1883–1914), Hungarian sculptor
- Kornél Szántó (born 1978), Hungarian short track speed skater
- Kornél Szűcs (born 2001), Hungarian football player
- Gábor Kornél Tolnai (1902–1982), Hungarian-Swedish engineer, inventor, constructor
- Kornel Ujejski (1823–1897), Polish poet, patriot and political writer of the Austrian Empire
- Viktorin Kornel of Všehrdy (1460–1520), Czech humanist and lawyer, Vice-scribe at the Land Court in Prague Castle
- Kornel Witkowski (born 2002), Polish figure skater

== See also ==
- The Wondrous Voyage of Kornel Esti, a 1995 Hungarian drama film
- Kernell (disambiguation)
- Kornele
- Kornelia
- Kornelin (disambiguation)
- Korneliya
- Cornelius (disambiguation)
