= List of 16th-century women artists =

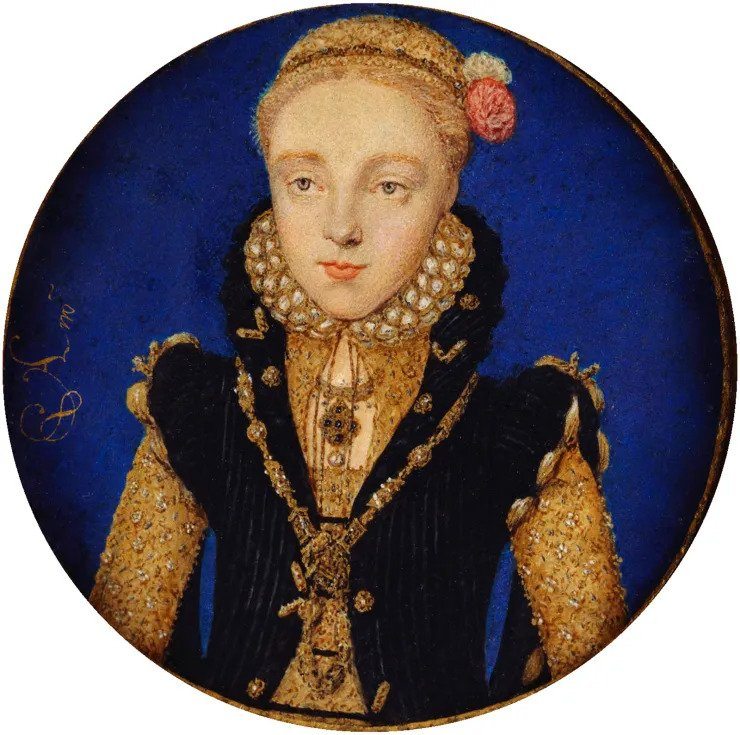
Portrait of Elizabeth I attributed to Levina Teerlinc, c. 1560–5. The Royal Collection.

16th-century women artists – female painters, miniaturists, manuscript illuminators, calligraphers, engravers and sculptors born between 1500 and 1600.

== Asia ==
=== China ===
- Ma Shouzhen (c. 1548–1604) – Gējì and artist, painter, poet, and composer.
- Xue Susu (c.1564–1650? C.E.) – Gējì, poet, painter, archer.
- Qiu Zhu (fl. 1565–1585) – painter, daughter of painter Qiu Ying.

=== Japan ===
- Ono Otsū (1559 or 1568–1631) – noblewoman, calligrapher, poet, painter and musician.

== Europe ==
=== Italy ===
See: List of Italian Renaissance female artists

=== Netherlands ===
- Marguerite Scheppers (active from 1501 onward) – miniaturist.
- Cornelia van Wulfschkercke (d. 1540) – miniaturist, pupil of Marguerite Scheppers
- Susannah Hornebolt (1503–c. 1554) – daughter of painter Gerard Hornebolt, gentlewoman attendant to queen Jane Seymour. First known female artist in England.
- Levina Teerlinc (1510s – 23 June 1576) – miniaturist who served as a painter to the English court. Daughter of painter Simon Bening.
- Mayken Verhulst (1518–1596 or 1599) – painter, miniaturist. Wife of painter Pieter Coecke van Aelst, mother-in-law of Pieter Brueghel the Elder, the first teacher of her grandsons Pieter Brueghel the Younger and Jan Brueghel the Elder.
- Mechtelt van Lichtenberg (ca. 1520–1598) painter, mother and teacher of Cornelia and Margaretha toe Boecop.
- Catharina van Hemessen (1527–1587) – daughter of painter Jan Sanders van Hemessen.
- Margaretha toe Boecop (before 1551 – after 1610) – daughter of female painter of Mechtelt van Lichtenberg
- Cornelia toe Boecop (1551 – after 1629) – daughter of female painter of Mechtelt van Lichtenberg
- Anna van Cronenburg (1552 – after 1590) – relative of painter Adriaan van Cronenburg.
- Colette van den Keere (1568–1629) – engraver, daughter of foundry artist Hendrik van den Keere
- Anna Roemersdr. Visscher (1584–1652) – artist, poet, translator, glass engraver.
- Clara Peeters (1589–1657?) – Flemish still-life painter from Antwerp
- Maria Tesselschade Visscher (1594–1649) – poet and glass engraver.

=== British Isles ===
- Jane Segar (?) – sister of William Segar, manuscript illuminator
- Elizabeth Lucar (1510–1537) – calligrapher
- Esther Inglis (1571–1624), miniaturist, worked in Scotland.
- Anne Gulliver, painter, wife of court painter John Brown (d. 1532)
- Alice Herne, painter wife of court painter William Herne (or Heron, d. 1580)

Flemish females at Tudor court:

- Susannah Hornebolt (1503–c. 1554) – daughter of painter Gerard Hornebolt, gentlewoman attendant to queen Jane Seymour. First known female artist in England.
- Levina Teerlinc (1510s – 23 June 1576) – miniaturist who served as a painter to the English court. Daughter of painter Simon Bening.

=== France ===
- Suzanne de Court (fl. 1600) – enamel painter in the Limoges workshops, possibly the daughter of Jean de Court

=== Sweden ===
- Anna Swenonis (d. 1527) – nun, manuscript illuminator

=== Switzerland ===
- Eva Abyberg (1588–1669)

== Books ==
- Weidner, M.S. Views from Jade Terrace : Chinese women artists, 1300–1912
- Yuho, Tseng. “Women Painters of the Ming Dynasty.” Artibus Asiae, vol. 53, no. 1/2, 1993, pp. 249–61.
- “Splendid Japanese Women Artists of the Edo Period”. Special Exhibition on the 120th Anniversary of Jissen Women's Educational Institute, at the Kōsetsu Memorial Museum, Tokyo, April 18–June 21, 2015
- Harris, Anne Sutherland and Linda Nochlin, Women Artists: 1550–1950, Los Angeles County Museum of Art, Knopf, New York, 1976
- Heller, Nancy. Women Artists: An Illustrated History. New York: Abbeville Press, 1997. ISBN 0-7892-0345-6
- J. Dabbs (ed.), Life Stories of Women Artists, 1550–1800. An Anthology (Farnham 2009).
