= Kees =

Kees or KEES may refer to:

- Kees (given name)
- Kees (surname)
- KEES, an American AM radio station licensed to Gladewater, Texas
- Kees, glacier in the Eastern Alps

== See also ==
- Cees (disambiguation)
