= Cornelis =

- Pronunciation: kor-NAY-lis
- Gender: Male
- Language: Dutch

Origin
- Language: Latin
- Origin: Cornelius

Other names
- Short forms: Cor, Corneel, Niels, Neels
- Pet names: Cees, Kees
- Cognate: Cornelia

Cornelis is a Dutch form of the male given name Cornelius. Some common shortened versions of Cornelis in Dutch are Cees, Cor, Corné, Corneel, Crelis, Kees, Neel, Nelis and Niels.

Cornelis (Kees) and Johannes (Jan) used to be the most common given names in the Low Countries, and the origin of the term Yankees is commonly thought to derive from the term Jan-Kees for the Dutch settlers in New Netherland.

Among the notable persons named Cornelis are:

- Cornelis Engebrechtsz (c. 1462 – 1527), painter from Leiden
- Cornelis Massijs (c. 1508 – 1556), painter from Flanders, Belgium
- Cornelis Floris de Vriendt (1513/14-1575), architect and sculptor
- Cornelis Cort (c. 1533 – 1578), engraver and draughtsman
- Cornelis Corneliszoon (c. 1550 – 1607), inventor of the wind powered sawmill
- Cor Dillen (c. 1920 – 2009), director of Philips and their CEO in South America
- Cornelis van Haarlem (1562–1638), leading Northern Mannerist painter
- Cornelis de Houtman (1565–1599), explorer who started the Dutch spice trade
- Cornelis Drebbel (1572–1633), builder of the first navigable submarine
- Cornelis de Vos (1584–1651), Flemish Baroque painter
- Cornelis de Graeff (1599–1664), Golden Age politician
- Cornelis Evertsen (disambiguation) (1610–1666, 1628–1679, 1642–1706), three admirals in the Anglo-Dutch Wars
- Cornelis de Witt (1623–1672), politician of the Dutch Republic
- Cornelis Tromp (1629–1691), admiral in the Anglo-Dutch Wars and in the Scanian War
- Cornelis Pietersz Bega (1631/32-1664), painter and engraver
- Cornelis de Bruijn (1652–1726/27), artist and traveler
- Cornelis Cruys (1655–1727), first commander of the Russian Baltic Fleet
- Cornelis Dusart (1660–1704), genre painter, draftsman, and printmaker
- Cornelis (born 1953), former governor of West Kalimantan, Indonesia
- Cornelis de Pauw (1739–1849), philosopher, geographer and diplomat
- Cornelis Tiele (1830–1902), theologian and scholar
- Cornelis Lely (1854–1929), civil engineer and statesman
- Cornelis Jacobus Langenhoven (1873–1932), South African writer and poet
- Cornelis Bernardus van Niel (1897–1985), microbiologist
- Cornelis Broerse (1900–1972), artist
- Cor Kammeraad (1902–1978), Dutch politician
- Cornelis Berkhouwer (1919–1992), President of the European Parliament 1973–75
- Cornelis van Beverloo (1922–2010), artist better known under his pseudonym "Corneille"
- Cornelis Vreeswijk (1937–1987), Dutch-Swedish singer, poet and actor
- Cornelis Zitman (1926–2016), Dutch sculptor and draftsman
- Cornelis Bodenstein (born 1992), South African-born cricketer
- Cornelis Schuuring (born 1942), Dutch racing cyclist

== Surname ==
Cornelis also is a patronymic surname, quite common in Flanders. People with this surname include:

- Emma Cornelis (born 1999), French rower
- nl:Evert Cornelis (1884–1931), Dutch conductor and organist
- Guy R. Cornelis (born 1946), Belgian microbiologist
- Hans Cornelis (born 1982), Belgian footballer
- Hendrik Cornelis (1910–1999), Belgian civil servant; last governor-general of Belgian Congo
- Jean Cornelis (1941–2016), Belgian footballer
- Joseph Cornelis (1917–2000), Belgian boxer

== See also ==
- Cees
- Cornelia (name), the feminine version of the name
- Cornelius (name)
- Kees (given name)
