= Kees Tol =

Kees Tol is the name of:

- Pier Tol, Kees "Pier" Tol, born 1958, Dutch retired international footballer.
- Kees Tol (footballer), Dutch footballer
