= Cees =

- Pronunciation: Dutch: [keːs]
- Gender: Male
- Language: Dutch

Origin
- Language: Latin
- Origin: Cornelius
- Derivation: Cornelis

Other names
- Alternative spelling: Kees

Cees (Dutch: [keːs]) is a Dutch masculine given name, a short form of Cornelis. Since, as in English, the letter "c" before "e" is normally pronounced /s/ in Dutch, the alternative spelling Kees is more common.

Notable people named Cees include:

- Cees Andriesse (born 1939), Dutch physicist and historian of science
- Cees Bal (born 1951), Dutch cyclist
- Cees Berkhouwer (1919–1992), Dutch VVD politician
- Cees van Bladel (born 1962), Dutch sports sailor
- Cees Bol (born 1995), Dutch cyclist
- Cees van Bruchem (born 1950), Dutch politician
- Cees Dekker (born 1959), Dutch biophysicist
- Cees Doorakkers (born 1963), Dutch motorcycle road racer
- Cees van Dongen (1932–2011), Dutch motorcycle road racer
- Cees van Espen (born 1938), Dutch road cyclist
- Cees Geel (1965–2026), Dutch television, radio and film actor
- Cees Gravesteijn (born 1928), Dutch canoer
- Cees Groot (1932–1988), Dutch footballer
- Cees Haast (1938–2019), Dutch cyclist
- Cees Hamelink (born 1940), Dutch communication scientist
- Cees Heerschop (1935–2014), Dutch footballer
- Cees Helder (born 1948), Dutch chef
- Cees Jan Diepeveen (born 1956), Dutch biophysicist
- Cees Juffermans (born 1982), Dutch short track speed skater
- Cees Keizer (born 1986), Dutch footballer
- Cees van der Knaap (born 1951), Dutch CDA politician
- Cees Koch (1925–2024), Dutch canoer
- Cees Koch (1936–2021), Dutch discus thrower and shot putter
- Cees van Kooten (1948–2015), Dutch footballer
- Cees Krijnen (born 1969), Dutch contemporary artist
- Cees Kurpershoek (born 1943), Dutch sports sailor
- Cees Lagrand (born 1936), Dutch canoer
- Cees van der Leeuw (1890–1973), Dutch artist
- Cees Lok (born 1966), Dutch footballer
- Cees Maas (born 1947), Dutch chief financial officer
- Cees Nooteboom (1933–2026), Dutch novelist, poet, and journalist
- Cees Paauwe (born 1977), Dutch football goalkeeper
- Cees Priem (born 1950), Dutch cyclist
- Cees van Riel (born 1951), Dutch organizational theorist
- Cees Schapendonk (born 1955), Dutch footballer
- Cees See (1934–1985), Dutch jazz drummer
- Cees Stam (born 1945), Dutch track cyclist
- Cees Timmer (1903–1978), Dutch artist
- Cees Toet (born 1987), Dutch footballer
- Cees Veerman (1943–2014), Dutch singer, composer and guitarist
- Cees Veerman (born 1949), Dutch CDA politician
- Cees Vervoorn (born 1960), Dutch swimmer
- Cees de Vreugd (1952–1998), Dutch strongman and powerlifter
- Cees Jan Winkel (born 1962), Dutch swimmer
- Cees de Wolf (1945–2011), Dutch footballer

== See also ==
- Kees (given name)
- Kees (surname)
- CEES (disambiguation)
