= Poggenkrug =

Coordinates: 53°33′34″N 7°42′41″E

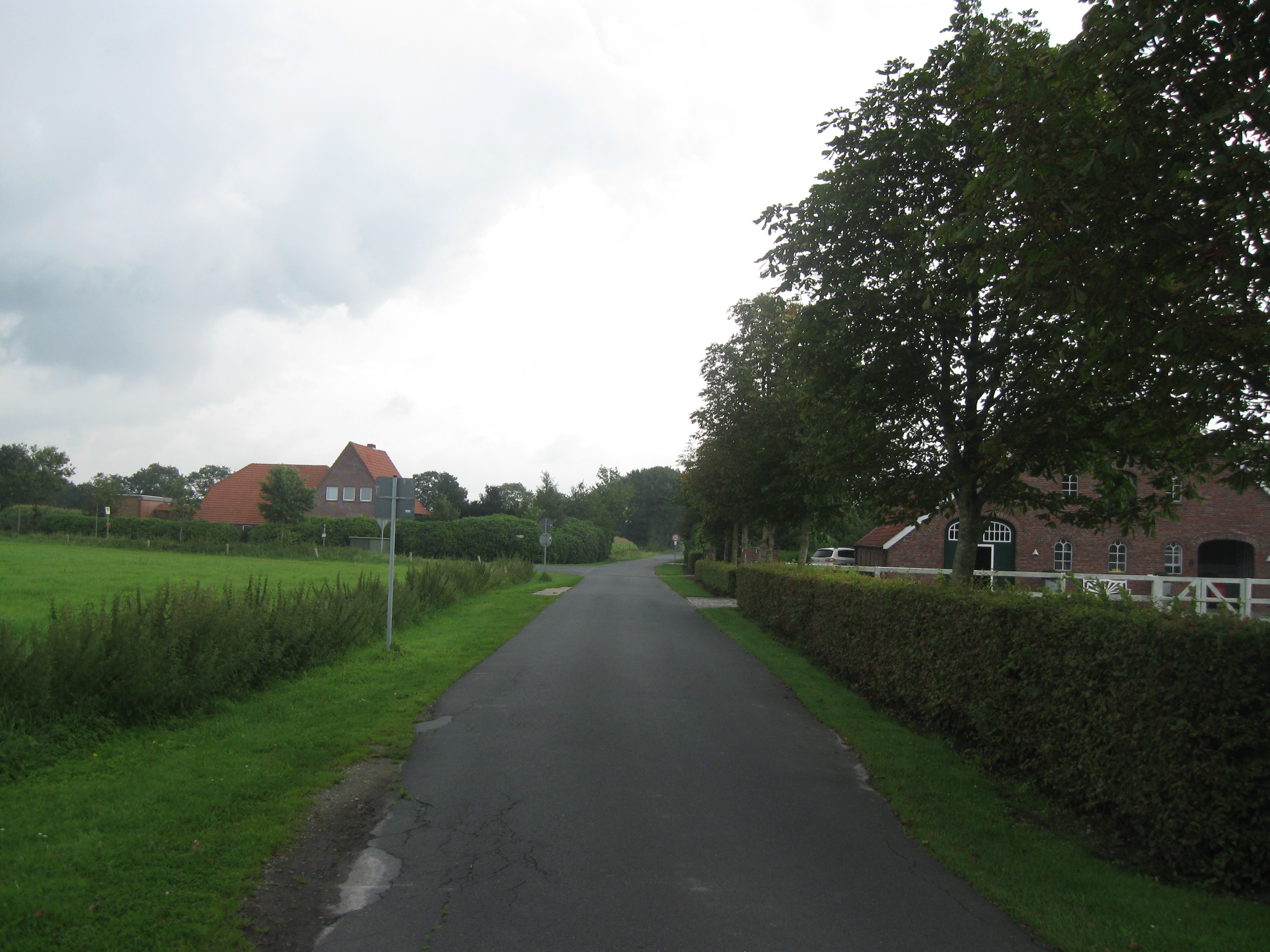
Poggenkrug seen from the “Alten Postweg” towards Willen

Poggenkrug is a district of Willen, a borough of Wittmund in German Lower Saxony. Poggenkrug has about 50 inhabitants and borders at the "Alten Postweg" (which goes from Wittmund to Ardorf) and at the Northern forest of Wittmund. In Poggenkrug is the source of the Töpperschloot. It should not be confused with Poggenkrug a historical watermill (Wassermuhle), in former Pomerania listed in the 1912-1913 Meyers Gazetteer

== History ==
Willen, including Poggenkrug and other hamlets, was incorporated into Wittmund in 1972. The village was recorded on maps already in 1730. In 1945, Tannenkamp became part of Poggenkrug.

== Population ==
Historical population
Year	Pop.	±% p.a.
1990	51	—
2000	55	+0.76%
2010	49	−1.15%
