= Kammeraad =

Kammeraad may refer to:

- Cor Kammeraad (1902–1978), Dutch politician
- Quincy Kammeraad (born 2001), Dutch-Filipino football player
