= Nel (name) =

Nel is both a South African (Afrikaans) surname and a Dutch feminine given name.

Notable people with the name include:

== Given name ==
=== Feminine name ===
The Dutch feminine name is a short form of Petronella or Cornelia. People with the name include:

- Nel Benschop (1918–2005), Dutch poet
- Nel Bos (1947), Dutch swimmer
- Nel Büch (1931–2013), Dutch sprinter
- Nel Burgerhof (1908–1991), Dutch gymnast
- Nel de Crits (born 1991), Belgian racing cyclist
- Nel Erasmus (born 1928), South African abstract artist
- Nel Fritz (born 1937), Dutch gymnast
- Nel Garritsen (1933–2014), Dutch swimmer
- Nel Ginjaar-Maas (1931–2012), Dutch State Secretary of Education
- Nel Karelse (1926–2015), Dutch sprinter and long-jumper
- Nel Law (1914–1990), Australian artist, poet and diarist
- Nel Noddings (1929–2022), American feminist, educationalist, and philosopher
- Nel van Randwijk (1905–1978), Dutch gymnast
- Nel Roos-Lodder (1914–1996), Dutch discus thrower
- Nel van Vliet (1926–2006), Dutch swimmer
- Nel Wambach (born 1938), Dutch gymnast
- Nel Zwier (1936–2001), Dutch high jumper

=== Masculine name ===
Often a short form of Nelson

- Nel Martín (born 1980), Spanish vert skater
- Nel Oduber (born 1947), Prime Minister of Aruba
- Nel Tarleton (1906–1956), English featherweight boxer
- Nel Ust Wyclef Jean (born 1969), Haitian musician better known as Wyclef Jean

== Surname ==
- André Nel (born 1977), South African cricketer
- Andries Nel (born 1965), South African deputy minister
- Anton Nel (born 1961), South African classical pianist
- Christof Nel (born 1944), German theatre and opera director
- Corne Nel, South African rugby player
- Dewald Nel (born 1980), South African-born Scottish cricketer
- Elizabeth Nel (1917–2007), English-born South African personal secretary to Winston Churchill during the Second World War
- Fred Nel, South African politician
- Gerrie Nel (born 1961), South African advocate and prosecutor
- Gert Cornelius Nel (1885–1950), South African botanist
- Gert Vlok Nel (born 1963), South African poet
- Grant Nel, South African-Born Australian diver
- Jack Nel (1928–2018), South African cricketer
- Jacques Nel (born 1993), South African rugby player
- Japie Nel (born 1982), South African rugby player
- JP Nel (born 1981), South African rugby player
- Justin Nel (born 1987), Namibian rugby player
- Krubert Nel (born c. 1960), South African Army officer
- Philip Nel (born 1969), American scholar of children's literature and professor of English
- Philip J. Nel (1902–1984), South African rugby union player
- Riana Nel (born 1982), Namibian singer and songwriter
- Ruhan Nel (born 1991), South African rugby union player
- Susan Nel (born 1956), South African lawn bowler
- Vita Nel, South African beach volleyball player
- Wenda Nel (born 1988), South African hurdler
- W. P. Nel (born 1986), South African-born Scottish rugby player

== See also ==
- Nela (name)
- Nell (disambiguation)
