= Töpperschloot =

Coordinates: 53.5564°N 7.7026°E

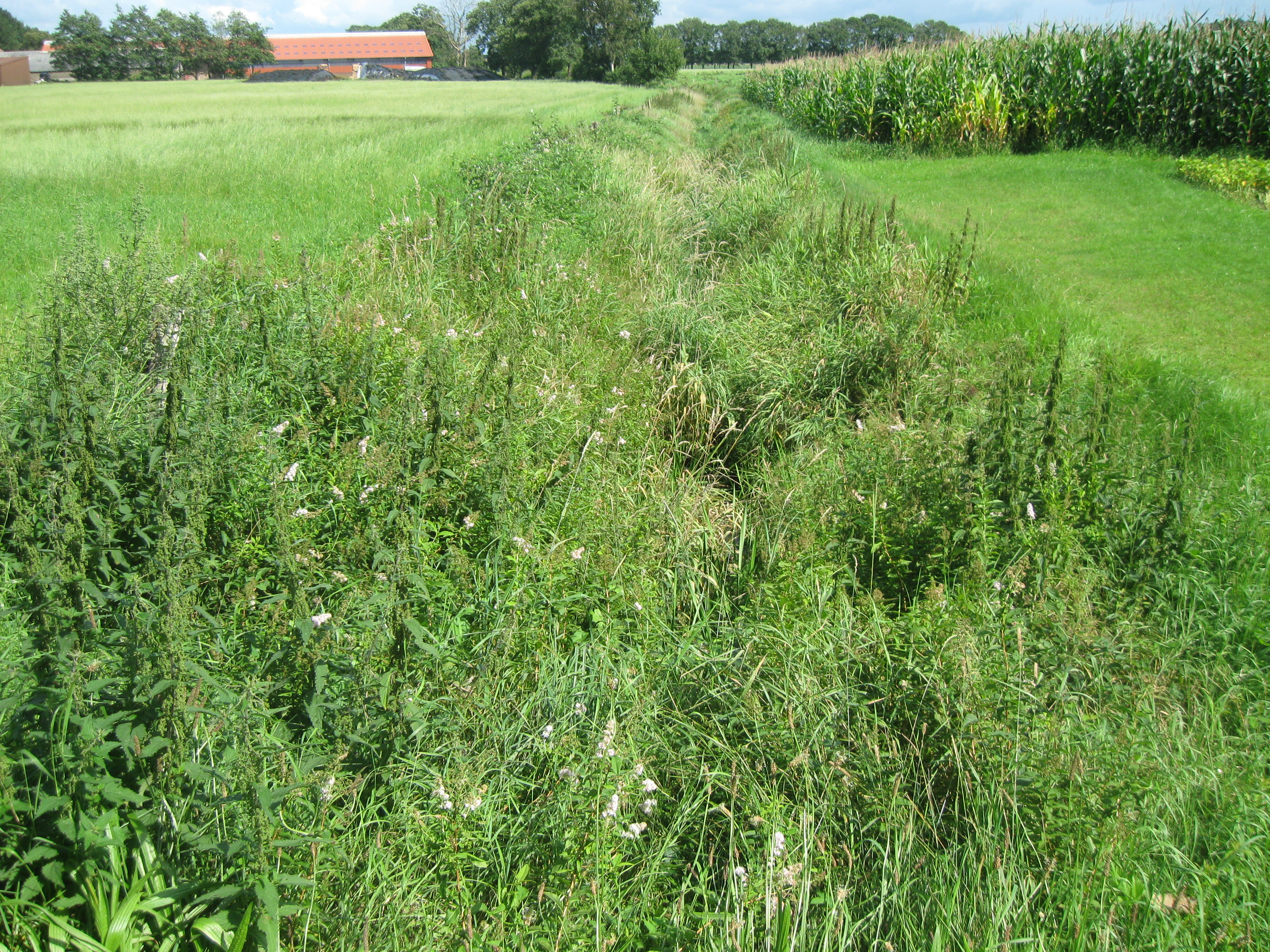

Location
- Location: Landkreis Wittmund
- Reference no.: DE: 9391164

Physical characteristics
- Source
  - location: Poggenkrug
  - elevation: ca. 6 m above sea level (NN)
- Mouth
  - location: Poggenkruger Leide
  - elevation: 5 m above sea level (NN)
- Length: 424 m
- Basin size: 10 ha

Basin features
- Progression: Poggenkruger Leide → Norder Tief → Harle → North Sea
- River system: Harle (Fluss)/Harle
- Population: 50
- Navigable: not navigable

The Töpperschloot is a canal in the area of Poggenkrug, Willen, in the district Wittmund in East Frisia . It rises at the Bundesstraße 210 and flows approximately 1200 feet south-southeast into the Poggenkruger Leide.
