= Kees (given name) =

- Pronunciation: Dutch: [keːs]
- Gender: Male
- Language: Dutch

Origin
- Language: Latin
- Origin: Cornelius
- Derivation: Cornelis

Other names
- Alternative spelling: Cees

Kees is a masculine nickname, contracted (shortened) name, or given name common in the Netherlands, originally derived from the name Cornelis. An alternate spelling is Cees.

Notable people with the given name Kees include:

- Kees Adema, American philatelist
- Kees van Baaren (1906–1970), Dutch composer and teacher
- Kees Bakels (born 1945), Dutch conductor
- Kees Blom (born 1946), Dutch ecologist
- Kees Bol (1916–2009), Dutch painter and art educator
- Kees Broekman (1927–1992), Dutch speed skater
- Kees Brusse (1925–2013), Dutch actor and film director
- Kees Bruynzeel (1900–1980), Dutch businessman, timber merchant and yachtsman
- Kees van Dongen 1877–1968, Dutch-French painter
- Kees Fens (1929–2009), Dutch writer, essayist and literary critic
- Kees Hengeveld (born 1957), Dutch linguist
- Kees Kist (born 1952), Dutch footballer
- Kees van Kooten (born 1941), Dutch comedian, television actor and author
- Kees Kwakman (born 1983), Dutch footballer
- Kees Luyckx (born 1986), Dutch footballer
- Kees Maks (1876–1967), Dutch painter
- Kees Meeuws (born 1974), New Zealand rugby union prop
- Kees Moeliker (born 1960), Dutch biologist
- Kees Ouwens (1944–2004), Dutch novelist and poet
- Kees Pijl (1897–1976), Dutch footballer
- Kees van Prooijen (born 1952), Dutch artist and musicologist
- Kees Rietveld (born 1969), Dutch singer, known as Georgie Davis
- Kees Rijvers, (1926–2024), Dutch footballer
- Kees Schouhamer Immink (born 1946), Dutch scientist, inventor, and entrepreneur
- Kees van der Spek (born 1964), Dutch journalist
- Kees van der Staaij (born 1968), Dutch politician
- Kees Teer (1925–2021), Dutch electrical engineer
- Kees Pier Tol, (born 1958), Dutch footballer
- Kees Tol (footballer) (born 1987), Dutch footballer
- Kees Torn (born 1967), Dutch text writer and comedy performer
- Kees Vendrik (born 1963), Dutch politician
- Kees Smit (born 2006), Dutch footballer
- Kees Verkade (1941–2020), Dutch artist and sculptor
- Kees Verkerk (born 1942), Dutch speed skater
- Kees Versteegh (born 1947), Dutch linguist
- Kees Zwamborn (born 1952), Dutch footballer

== See also ==
- Cees
- Kees (surname)
- Yankee
