= Mechtelt van Lichtenberg =

Dutch painter

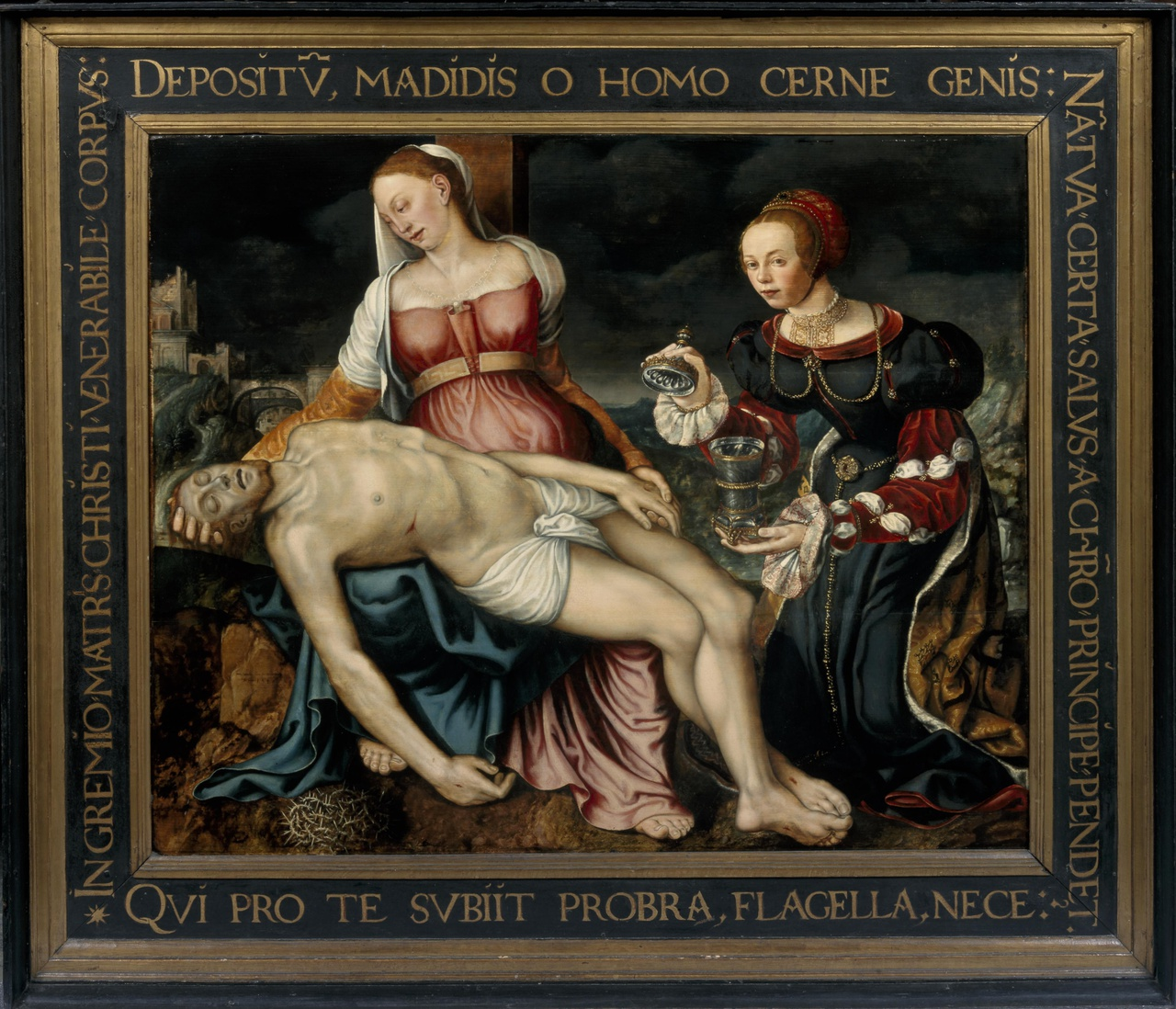
Pieta with Mary Magdalene (1546)

Mechtelt van Lichtenberg (ca. 1520 – 1598), also known as Mechtelt toe Boecop, was a 16th century Dutch painter and one of the few northern female Dutch painters of the period whose name is known.

== Family ==
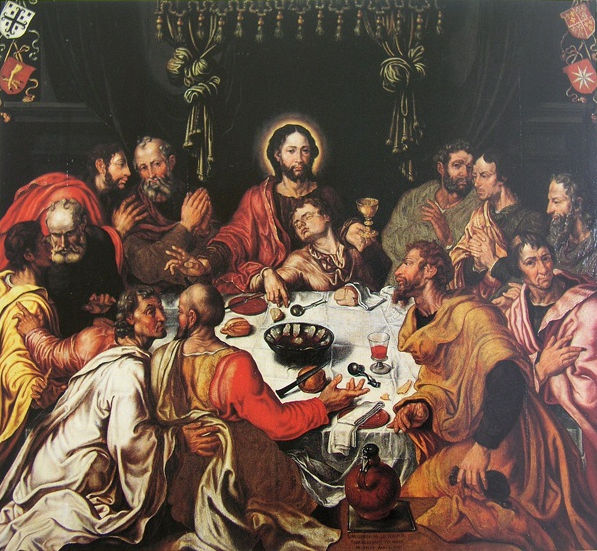
Detail of the Last Supper (1574)

Mechtelt (sometimes spelled Mechteld) van Lichtenberg was born in Utrecht, Holland, the daughter of Gerrit Lichtenberg (d. 1549), a member of the guild of saddlers and a city councilman, and Cornelia de Vooght van Rijnevelt. Sometime between 1546 and 1549 she married Egbert Boecop (d. 1578), a church master in Kampen. They had a son and five daughters, and two of their daughters — Margaretha toe Boecop (before 1551 – after 1610) and Cornelia toe Boecop (1551 – after 1629) — also became recognized artists.

== Career ==
It is unclear how van Lichtenberg learned to paint, although it is possible she was apprenticed to Jan van Scorel. Her work shows both his influence and that of his pupil Maarten van Heemskerck.

Her earliest known work is an oil on panel entitled Pieta with Mary Magdalene from 1546, now in the collection of the Centraal Museum in Utrecht. The Stedelijk Museum Kampen has other works by her, including Adoration of the Shepherd (1572) and a large painting of The Last Supper on two panels (1574). The Last Supper features members of the Boecop family as apostles. Few other pieces are known to have survived.

She signed her early work 'Mechtelt van Lichtenberg' and her later work 'Mechtelt van Lichtenberg otherwise known as Boecop'.

== Selected works ==
- Pieta with Mary Magdalene (1546)
- Adoration of the Shepherd (1572)
- The Last Supper (1574)
