= CEES =

CEES may refer to:

- Centro de Estudios Económico-Sociales, Center for Economic and Social Studies, Guatemala
- Common European Economic Space, a sphere of cooperation between the European Union and Russia
- Centre d'essais d'engins spéciaux, the original name for the now abandoned French space center Centre interarmées d'essais d'engins spéciaux

== See also ==
- Cees (given name)
- Kees (disambiguation)
