= Elisabeth Mooij =

Dutch actress

Elisabeth Mooij, also known by her married name Elisabeth Ghijben (Amsterdam, 1712 – Amsterdam, 1759), was a Dutch actress. She was among the biggest stars in the Netherlands in her time.

== Biography ==
Elisabeth Mooij was the daughter of the wine maker Willem Mooij and Sara Ledeboer. In 1731, she married the oyster dealer Robbert Ghijben and together they had three sons and two daughters but two sons died at a young age. She was employed at the Amsterdamse Schouwburg theatre in 1743–1759. After the death of its premiere actress, Anna Maria de Bruyn in 1744, she was made first actress, and after this, she was often given the leading roles in the theatre's productions.

Elizabeth's daughter was the acclaimed actress Cornelia Ghijben and Elizabeth's granddaughter, Cornelia Bouhon, carried on the family tradition as a performer at the Schouwburg theater for at least 30 years.

== See also ==
- Johanna Wattier
