= Anna Maria de Bruyn =

Dutch actress and ballet dancer

- Born: 1708; Zwolle
- Died: May 28, 1744 (aged 35–36)
- Occupation(s): Stage actress, ballet dancer
- Spouse: Jan Punt (1733–1744)
- Children: 5

Anna Maria de Bruyn (ca. 1708, Zwolle – buried 28 May 1744, Amsterdam) was a leading Dutch stage actress and ballet dancer.

She was born to the actors Jan de Bruyn (died 1749), and Elizabeth Bleeck (1684–1751). She was active at the theaters of Amsterdam in 1719–1744. Originally employed with her family, she was given an individual contract in 1727. She was one of the stars of the theatre and was described as "The most beautiful jewel in the theatre's crown".

She married and actor Jan Punt on 8 November 1733 in Amsterdam and they had five children but three died at a young age. Anna Maria, died in 1744 during childbirth. On the stage, she was replaced as lead actress by Elisabeth Mooij.
