= Christian Alder =

German footballer

Personal information
- Date of birth: 3 September 1978 (age 48)
- Place of birth: Wittmund, West Germany
- Height: 1.85 m (6 ft 1 in)
- Position: Defender

Senior career*
Years	Team	Apps	(Gls)
1995–2000	Arminia Bielefeld	14	(1)
2000–2001	TuS Celle FC		
2001–2002	VfL Osnabrück	29	(0)
2002–2004	FC Augsburg	52	(0)
2004–2006	Jahn Regensburg	64	(3)
2006–2009	VfR Aalen	94	(14)
2009	Anorthosis Famagusta		
2010	KFC Uerdingen 05		
2010–2011	Rot Weiss Ahlen	14	(1)
2011	Maritzburg United		
2011–2012	SV Rödinghausen		
2013	TuS Haltern		
- * Club domestic league appearances and goals

Christian Alder (born 3 September 1978) is a German former professional footballer who played as a defender.

== Career ==
Alder was born in Wittmund, Lower Saxony. Between 1997 and 2000 he played for Arminia Bielefeld through their relegation and promotion in and out of the Bundesliga. He then played for VfL Osnabrück (in 2001) and FC Augsburg (between 2002 and 2004). From 2004 to 2006 he played for SSV Jahn Regensburg; in 2006 he joined VfR Aalen and left the team in June 2009, to sign on 22 July 2009 with Anorthosis Famagusta. After the firing of Ernst Middendorp Alder was released on 13 August 2009. Alder left Cyprus in January 2010 and signed for German lower league club KFC Uerdingen 05.
