= Margaretha toe Boecop =

Dutch painter (c. 1551 – c. 1629)

- Born: before 1551; Kampen, Netherlands
- Died: after 1574; Kampen, Netherlands
- Occupation: Painter
- Spouse: Philibert de Wolffs van Westenrode
- Mother: Mechtelt van Lichtenberg

Margaretha toe Boecop (born before 1551 in Kampen – died after 1574 in Kampen) was a Dutch painter from Northern Netherlands. Her mother and younger sister were also notable fine art painters.

== Biography ==
Margaretha toe Boecop was born into a wealthy family before 1551 in Kampen as the fourth of six children of the city councillor, alderman and churchwarden Egbert toe Boecop and his wife, the painter Mechtelt van Lichtenberg. She had a brother and four sisters, of whom her younger sister Cornelia toe Boecop also became a painter.

Margaretha and Cornelia were probably taught by their mother, as painting and drawing were part of the education of girls in higher society, like needlework and music. She married Philibert de Wolffs van Westenrode, the Lord of Potechem but any children from this marriage are not known.

When she was about 25 years old, Margaretha painted the work titled "The Four Evangelists," but the painting's current location is unknown. She signed the canvas with "I Margaretha toe Bocop mae fecit anno 1574". The four evangelists appear to be talking to each other and are depicted with their holy symbols.

Her life, outside of her marriage, remains undocumented.

She died sometime after 1574 in her native Kampen.

== Known work ==
- The Four Evangelists (1574), (location unknown)
