= Cornelis Evertsen =

Cornelis Evertsen may refer to one of three Dutch admirals :

- Cornelis Evertsen the Elder (1610–1666)
- Cornelis Evertsen the Younger (1628–1679), nephew of Cornelis the Elder
- Cornelis Evertsen the Youngest (1642–1706), son of Cornelis the Elder
