= Cornelia Gillyard =

American organic chemist (born 1941)

- Born: February 1, 1941 (age 85); Talladega, Alabama; Clark Atlanta University
- Occupation: Organic chemist

Cornelia Denson Gillyard (born February 1, 1941) is an American organic chemist known for her work with chemicals in the environment.

== Early life and education ==
The eldest of three children, Gillyard was born on February 1, 1941, in Talladega, Alabama to a steel worker and a nurse. When she was young, Gillyard was involved with the local 4-H club, singing in the school chorus, cheerleading, and taking part in science fairs. At one such fair Gillyard and her partner won a prize for a wooden replica they made of a human skeleton. While in high school, Gillyard became very interested in chemistry. After graduating as valedictorian, she received a bachelor's degree in chemistry from Talladega College. Her senior project bridged chemistry and human health as she studied nuts and their nutrient contents as related to human growth.

After graduating from college she realized that she needed more money to pursue higher studies, so she took up a position at the Ohio State University's nuclear medicine laboratory. In 1964, she got a job setting up and running a new nuclear medicine laboratory at Nationwide Children's Hospital in Columbus, Ohio. In 1973, she received her master's degree in organic chemistry at Clark Atlanta University where she researched the chemistry of vitamin B12. She returned to Columbus and worked for the Battelle Memorial Institute, but returned to Atlanta in 1974 after getting married. In 1977, she began her doctoral degree in organic chemistry at Clark Atlanta University and began teaching chemistry at Spelman College. She focused on chemistry education for undergraduates. After receiving her PhD, she began teaching chemistry full-time at Spelman, where she also became the chair of the chemistry department.

== Career and research ==
Gillyard's research focuses on organoarsenic chemistry as well as pollutants and toxins in the environment. One of Gillyard's research focuses was on microbes and their potential for use in cleaning up environments polluted by contaminants like arsenic.

She serves on the Women Chemists Committee and the American Chemical Society's Scholars Selection Committee and Blue Ribbon Panel for Minority Affairs, and is a member of the National Organization for the Professional Advancement of Black Chemists and Chemical Engineers. She was the director of NASA's Women in Science and Engineering Scholars Program and the codirector of the National Science Foundation's Research in Chemistry for Minority Scholars Program.
