= Cornelia Bouhon =

Dutch actor, dancer, singer (1757–1823)

Cornelia Bouhon (1757–1823) was a Dutch stage actress, ballet dancer and opera singer for 30 years (1766–1797). She was known for her roles as the young heroine.

== Life ==
Bouhon was the second child born to two actors Johannes Bouhon and Cornelia Ghijben and was baptized in Amsterdam. She was the granddaughter of actress Elisabeth Mooij. Cornelia appeared on stage with her brother Johannes when they were young children. "Her earliest known performance was on 20 September 1766 in the Amsterdamse Schouwburg: the eight-year-old Cornelia Bouhon and her ten-year-old brother Johannes danced a hornpipe." In November, the siblings played in a comedy with divertissements (musical diversions). In the following years, the children were featured on stage multiple times as dancers or in children's roles, often featured on posters as "the children of Mr. Bouhon." During the 1767 season, Cornelia was paid two guilders for each performance. She was active as a ballet dancer until 1778. She also performed as an opera singer and a stage actor, often with her mother, Cornelia Ghijben who was paid very well and was a highly acclaimed performer.

Cornelia Bouhon was "with her extraordinarily beautiful figure" and "graceful and charming demeanor" named "the most beautiful of the stage" (Galante Leeven). She danced and sang coquettish subretto roles in operettas and vocal plays. She also acted in theater plays, according to an overview of the Amsterdam troupe in 1772. When the Schouwburg Theater burned down in 1772, the family moved to a new theater in Rotterdam until the Schouwburg could be reopened in 1774. Bouhon was active as a dancer until 1778, and then performed as an actor in "the roles as youthful heroines".

In 1797, Cornelia Bouhon was dismissed from the Amsterdamse Schouwburg. Two years later she was working for the travelling theatre company of Ward Bingley. How long she remained associated with that company is not known.

She never married and died on 15 April 1823 at the age of 65.
