= Nel Martín =

Spanish professional vert skater (born 1980)

Nel Martin
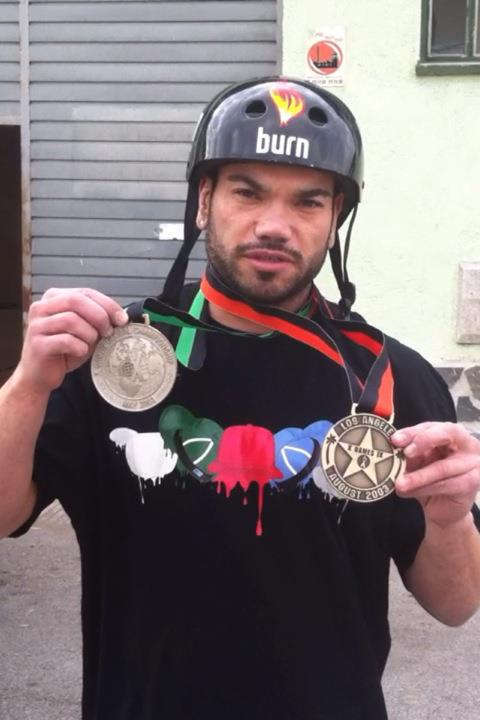

Personal information
- Nationality: Spanish
- Born: November 23, 1980 (age 45) Barcelona, Spain
- Height: 5 ft 4 in (163 cm)
- Weight: 148 lb (67 kg)

Sport
- Sport: Vert skating
Medal record
X Games
Representing Spain
Bronze medal – third place	2003 Los Angeles, CA, USA	Vert
Bronze medal – third place	2003 Montpellier, France	Vert

Nel Martin is a Spanish professional vert skater. Nel started skating in 1994 and earned a Bronze medal at the X Games in Los Angeles in 2003 and a Silver medal at the FISE contest in France in 2003.

Best Trick Double Backflip, Double Flatspin 540, Fakie 1080

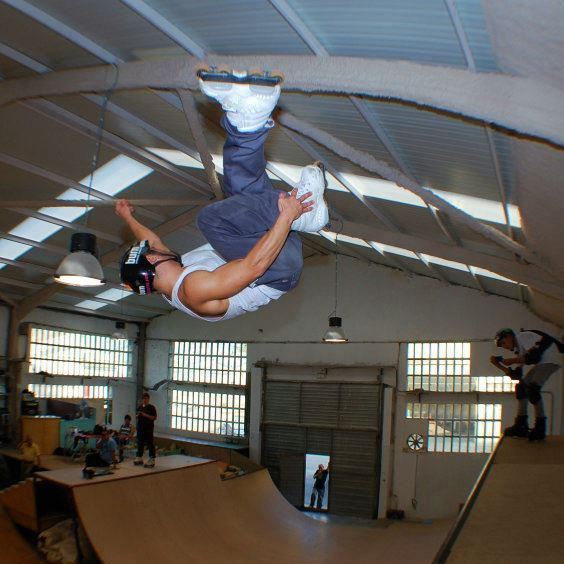
Nel Vert Skating

== Vert Competitions ==
- 2008 Asian X Games, Shanghai - Vert: 5th
- 2006 LG Action Sports World Tour, Paris, France - Vert: 6th
- 2006 LG Action Sports World Tour, Berlin, Germany - Vert: 9th
- 2006 LG Action Sports World Tour, Birmingham, England - Vert: 5th
- 2005 LG Action Sports Tour, Moscow, Russia - Vert: 4th
- 2005 LG Action Sports Tour, Munich, Germany - Vert: 10th
- 2004 ASA Pro Tour Year-End Ranking (Vert): 17th
- 2004 LG Action Sports Asian Tour, Shanghai, China: 6th
- 2004 LG Action Sports Asian Tour, Beijing, China: 7th
- 2004 LG Action Sports Asian Tour, Seoul, Korea: 5th
- 2004 X Games - Vert: 11th
- 2003 LG Action Sports Championships - Vert: 4th
- 2003 X Games - Vert: Bronze Medalist
- 2003 FISE, Montpellier, France - Vert: 2nd
- 2002 ESPN X Games - Vert: 7th
- 2002 European X Games - Vert: 4th
- 2002 Gravity Games - Vert: 5th
- 2002 ASA Pro Tour, Milwaukee, WI - Vert: 9th
- 2001 Gravity Games - Vert: 7th
- 2001 ASA Pro Tour - Rome, Italy: 4th
