= Cornelia Weihe =

German painter and sculptor (born 1959)

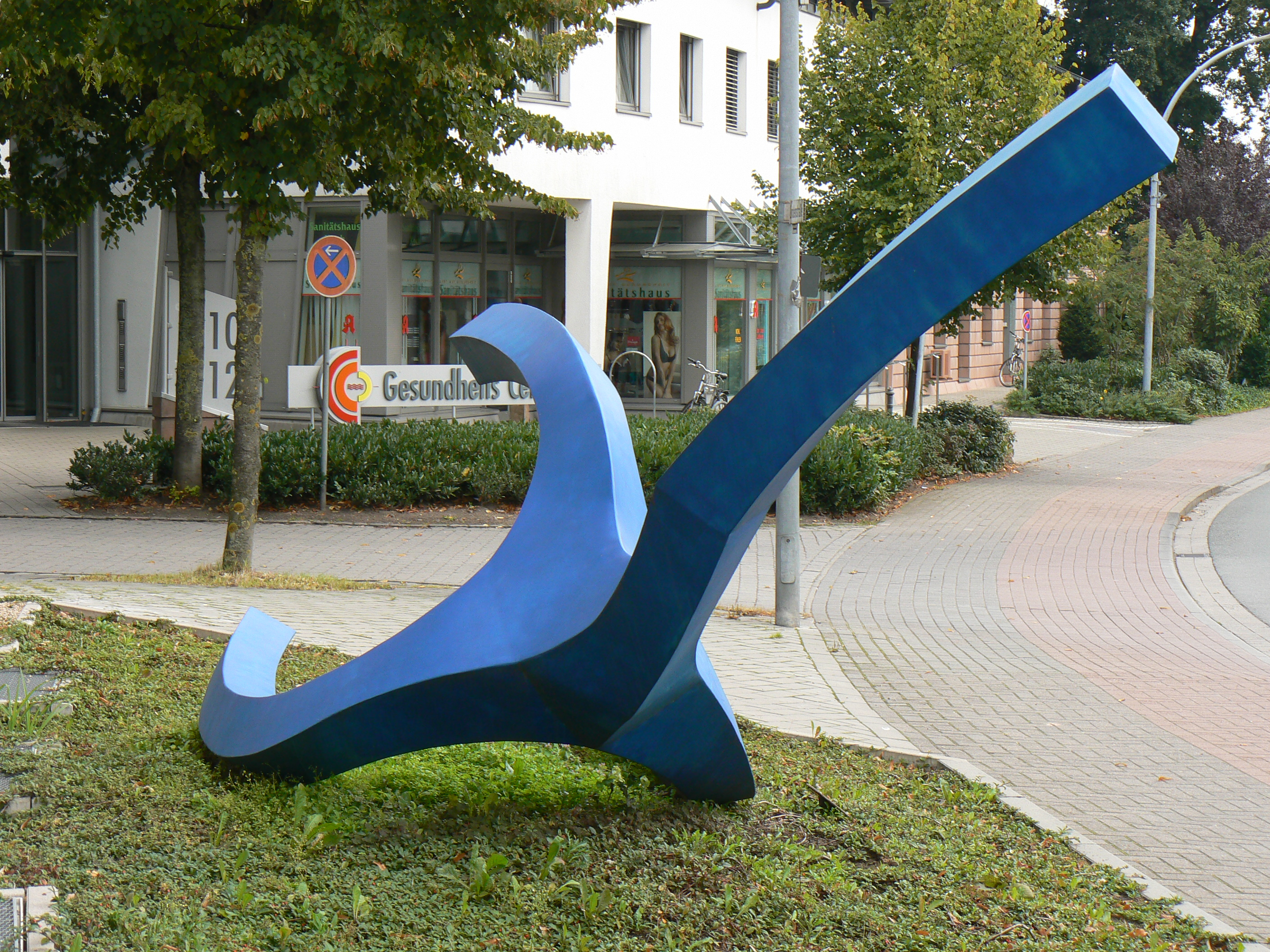
Blauer Zweig in Damme (2004)

Cornelia Weihe (born 11 September 1959) is a German painter and sculptor.

== Biography ==
Cornelia Weihe was born in Karl-Marx-Stadt. After her school education, she took part in practical courses, such as in a porcelain factory in Colditz, and at the Institute for Enamel Architecture in Thale. From 1981 to 1988 Weihe studied Metal Sculpture and Enamel with Irmtraud Ohme at the Burg Giebichenstein University of Art and Design in Halle an der Saale. Afterwards she worked as a freelance artist and from 1990 on as a research assistant at the Burg Giebichenstein University of Art and Design Halle. In 1991 she founded the Atelier für Metallkunst together with Rainer Henze, Thomas Leu and Friedemann Knappe.

In 1993, after the reunification of Germany, Weihe was one of the East and West German sculptors selected for the exhibition Stahlplastik in Deutschland (Steel sculpture in Germany) at the Staatliche Galerie Moritzburg in Halle. She took part in various sculpture symposia, including the 3rd East Frisian Sculpture Symposium of 1990 for steel sculptors in the East Frisian town of Wittmund. In 1990, she finished her work Große Liegende, which became part of the Dresden State Collection.

Cornelia Weihe lives and works in Halle. She has two children.

== Selected works ==
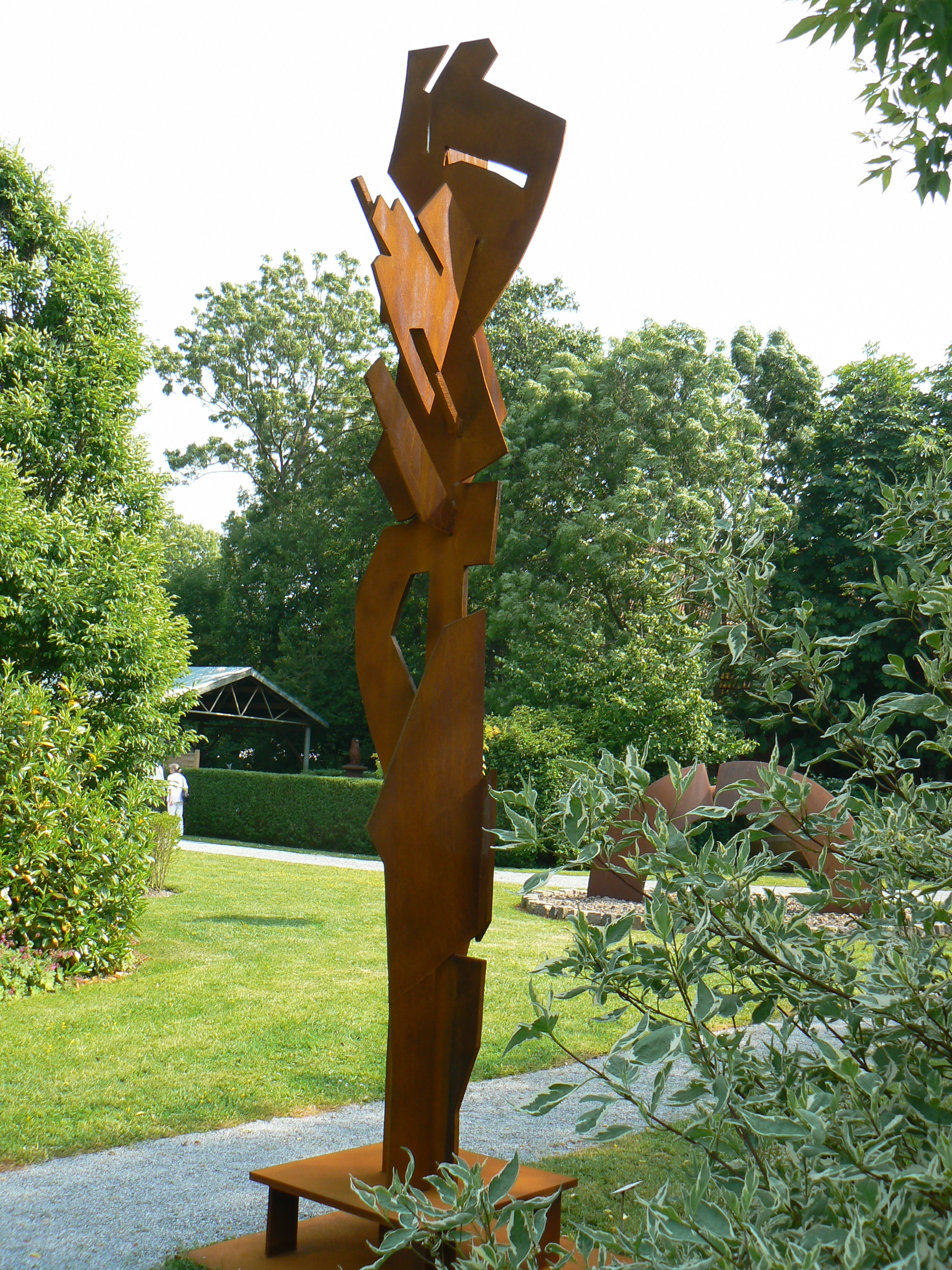
Stehende in Wittmund-Funnix (2000)

Sculptures in public space

- Torso (1989)
- Große Liegende (1990)
- Stehende (2000)
- Windfrüchte (2004)
- Blauer Zweig (2004)
- Flugkörper (2006)
- Zugvogel (2006/07)
- Kumulus (2016)
- Wanderer (2019)

Paintings

- Der Schritt (2004)
- Weites Land (2017)
- Kreatur (2019)
