= Kornél Sámuel =

Hungarian sculptor

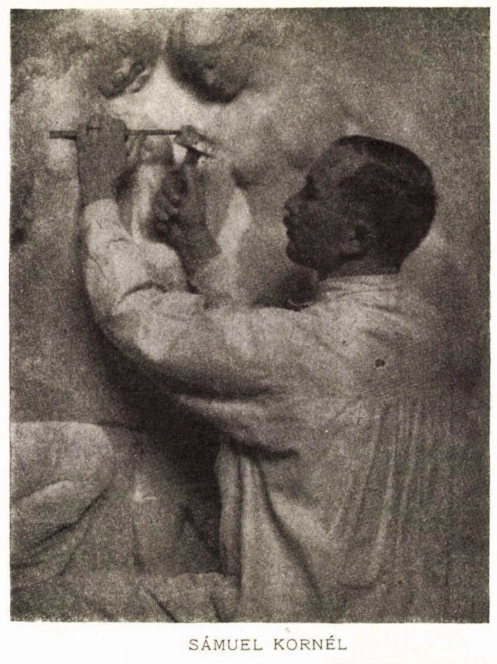
- 1913
- Born: 1883; Szilágykövesd
- Died: 1914 (aged 30–31); Uzsok
- Known for: Sculptor

Kornél Sámuel (1883 in Szilágykövesd - 1914 in Uzsok) was a Hungarian sculptor noted for his delicate rhythm and lyrical approach to sculpting. He died at the beginning of World War I and was the first victim from the arts in World War I from Hungary.

In 1911 he traveled to Italy. His other notable works include "Eve", "Narcissus", and "David".
