= Cornelia Füeg =

Swiss lawyer and politician (born 1941)

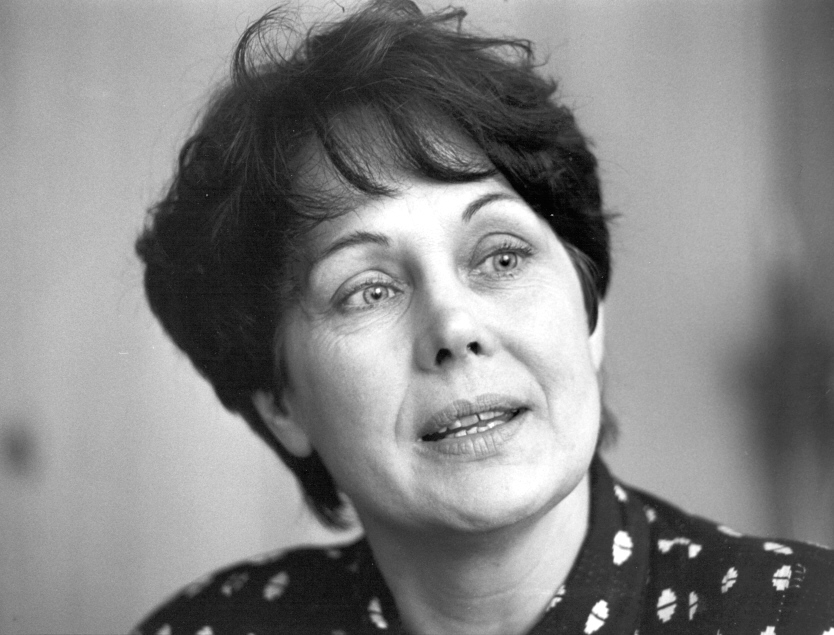

Personal details
- Born: Cornelia Hitz; 5 June 1941 (age 85) Hauenstein-Ifenthal, Switzerland
- Party: Free Democratic Party
- Spouse: Kurt Füeg
- Children: 4
- Education: University of Zurich; University of Berlin

Cornelia Füeg (née: Hitz; born 1941) is a Swiss lawyer and politician who served as the national councilor and government councilor of the canton of Solothurn.

== Early life and education ==
She was born Cornelia Hitz in Hauenstein-Ifenthal on 5 June 1941. She graduated from a girls' high school in Zurich. She studied law at the University of Zurich and the University of Berlin, obtaining a degree in 1965.

== Career and activities ==
Her husband and she ran a family farm in Wisen. She acquired the attorney and notary's license from the canton of Solothurn in 1971 and worked as a lawyer and notary. She joined the Free Democratic Party in 1971. She was elected as a municipal clerk in Wisen on 7 February 1971, being the first Swiss woman to hold the post, and was in office until 1974. Füeg, together with five other women, were elected to the Solothurn cantonal council in 1973, and her tenure ended in 1977.

Füeg was elected to the Federal Assembly on 1 December 1975 for the Free Democratic Party representing the canton of Solothurn and served in the post until 27 November 1983. She was the first Swiss woman represent the canton of Solothurn at the Parliament. She headed the building and justice department in the Solothurn cantonal government until her resignation in 1997.

From 1997 to 2002, Füeg chaired the Council for Regional Planning. From 2000 to 2002 she sat on the board of trustees of Pro Senectute and from 2001 to 2011 she was the first ombudswoman for the public transport association. Following her retirement from politics Füeg involved in the agricultural activities in Wisen.

== Personal life ==
She married Kurt Füeg in 1966, and they have four children. They reside in Olten.
