= Cees Maas =

Dutch businessman

Cees Maas (born May 1, 1947, Middelburg) is a former chief financial officer and vice chairman of the executive board for ING Group. He has been with the company since 1992 and became CFO in 1996. He graduated from Erasmus University Rotterdam with a degree in physical engineering and a master's degree in economics.

Cees Maas was a member of the Executive Board of ING Group from 1992 to 2007. In 1996, he was appointed Chief Financial Officer, and in 2004 became Vice Chairman of the Executive Board. Between 1976 and 1992, he worked at the Ministry of Finance, serving as Treasurer-General between 1986 and 1992. He is Chairman of the Supervisory Board of The Currency Exchange (TCX) Fund N.V. and the Erasmus Medical Centre, member of the Supervisory Board of BCD Holding N.V., Chairman of the Board of the Foundation 4 and 5 May, member and European Treasurer of the Trilateral Commission, member of the Capital Markets Consultative Group (IMF) and the International Advisory Board of the National Bank of Kuwait. He is also member of the Supervisory Board of [FMO], the Dutch development bank.

On 26 April 2007, Maas was made an Officer of the Order of Orange-Nassau by Queen Beatrix of the Netherlands. The honour was presented by Wouter Bos, the then Minister of Finance of the Netherlands.
