= Cornelia Ulrich =

German-American epidemiologist (born 1967)

Cornelia "Neli" Ulrich (born 31 October 1967 in Stuttgart-Bad Cannstatt, Germany) is Executive Director of the Comprehensive Cancer Center at Huntsman Cancer Institute (HCI), Jon M. and Karen Huntsman Presidential Professor in Cancer Research, and former Division Chief of Cancer Population Sciences in the Department of Population Health Sciences at the University of Utah.

Ulrich has published more than 500 publications (h-Index 101). Ulrich is a former Fulbright Scholar, DAAD Scholar, and an elected member to the European Academy of Cancer Sciences; she serves on numerous national and international advisory boards, committees, and editorial boards including several of the National Institutes of Health, National Academy of Sciences, Engineering and Medicine, International Agency for Research on Cancer (IARC) and American Association for Cancer Research (AACR), and was chair of the Scientific Council of IARC until May 2015.

She is a cancer epidemiologist whose research focuses on lifestyle and biologic factors in cancer prevention and cancer prognosis. Dr. Ulrich leads an interdisciplinary team of scientists on research related to the prevention, epidemiology, prognosis, and survivorship of cancer (ColoCare Study U01) and multiple R01-type grants. Key topics include the usage of inflammation inhibitors (e.g., aspirin) in cancer prevention and prognosis to prevent cancer, personalized medicine by using pharmacogenetics, and the role of energy balance and physical activity. Ulrich serves on advisory boards of multiple NCI-designated cancer centers. She has received numerous honors, including the Utah Governor’s Medal for Science and Technology.

== Life and education ==
Ulrich graduated in 1987 from the Gustav-Stresemann-Gymnasium in Fellbach, Germany and studied Nutritional Sciences at the University of Hohenheim and the Oregon State University. She completed her master's degree in 1992 at Oregon State University. In 1998 she completed her PhD in epidemiology at the University of Washington and the Fred Hutchinson Cancer Research Center. She is married and mother of two sons, Nico and Noah.

- 1987 Abitur Gustav-Stresemann-Gymnasium, Fellbach-Schmiden, Germany
- 1990 Vordiplom (comparable to bachelor's degree) University of Hohenheim, Germany, Major: Nutrition Science
- 1992 Master of Science (Nutrition; Minor: Public Health) Oregon State University, Corvallis
  - Master's Thesis: "Relationship between total, axial, and peripheral bone mineral density, lifetime milk consumption, and lifetime physical activity, in elderly mothers and their premenopausal daughters."(Mentor: Constance Georgiou)
- 1998 Ph.D. (Epidemiology) also: Certificate, Doctoral Studies Program (Health Services Research) University of Washington, Seattle
  - Dissertation: "Common polymorphisms in metabolizing enzymes – some implications for colon cancer etiology, prevention, and genetic testing." (Mentors: John D. Potter, Stephen Schwartz)

== Honors and awards ==
- 1991/92: Fulbright Scholarship and Fulbright Professional Enhancement Grant
- 1992: Jewell-Fields-Rohlfing graduate scholarship, Oregon State University
- 1993–95: DAAD Stipendium, für PhD-Studien in Epidemiologie
- 1998: Outstanding Student Award, Department of Epidemiology, University of Washington
- 1998: American Association for Cancer Research Bristol-Myers Squibb Young Investigator Awardhttps://sharedresources.fredhutch.org/profile/ulrich-cornelia
- 2009: Exzellenzprofessur, Deutsches Krebsforschungszentrum (DKFZ)
- 2011: Forschungs- und Entwicklungspreis 2011, Krebsverband Baden-Württemberg e.V.
- 2013: Felix Burda Award 2013, "Best Prevention Idea", Felix Burda Stiftung, Berlin
- 2014: Short-List Felix Burda Award 2014, "Wissenschaft und Science", Felix Burda Stiftung, Berlin
- 2014: Jon and Karen Huntsman Presidential Professor in Cancer Research
- 2018: National Academy of Medicine Annual Meeting Presentation
- 2019: Executive Leadership in Academic Medicine (ELAM) Program
- 2021: Distinguished Research Award, University of Utah
- 2021 Speaker, Harold C. Simmons Comprehensive Cancer Center Distinguished Lecture Series
- 2022 Grand Round Speaker, Moffitt Cancer Center
- 2022 Best Female Scientist Award, Research
- 2022 Excellence in Collaboration Award, Huntsman Cancer Institute
- 2023 Excellence in Collaboration Award, Huntsman Cancer Institute
- 2024 Simon M. Shubitz Lecture and Award, University of Chicago Medicine Comprehensive Cancer Center
- 2024 Distinguished Professorship, University of Utah
- 2024 Governor’s Medal for Science and Technology (Academia/Research)
- 2024 Directors’ Circle, Cancer Center Informatics Society
