= Cornelia toe Boecop =

Dutch painter (1551–1629)

- Born: 1551; Kampen, Netherlands
- Died: between 1630 and 1634; Sint-Michielsgestel, Netherlands
- Occupation: Painter
- Spouse(s): Roric van Harderwijck; Gerrit Boecop van Houwenberch
- Mother: Mechtelt van Lichtenberg

Cornelia toe Boecop (born 1551 – after 1629) was a Dutch fine art painter from the Dutch Republic. Her mother and older sister were also painters.

== Biography ==
Cornelia toe Boecop was born in 1551 in Kampen into a wealthy family as one of five siblings. Her father was the city councilor Egbert toe Boecop and her mother was the famous painter Mechtelt van Lichtenberg. Cornelia's older sister Margaretha toe Boecop also became a painter. The daughters were probably educated by their mother, as painting and drawing, like needlework and music, were part of a girl's education in high society at that time. Her first marriage was to Roric van Harderwijck before 1601 and after he died, she married Gerrit Boecop van Houwenberch. There were no known offspring from these marriages.

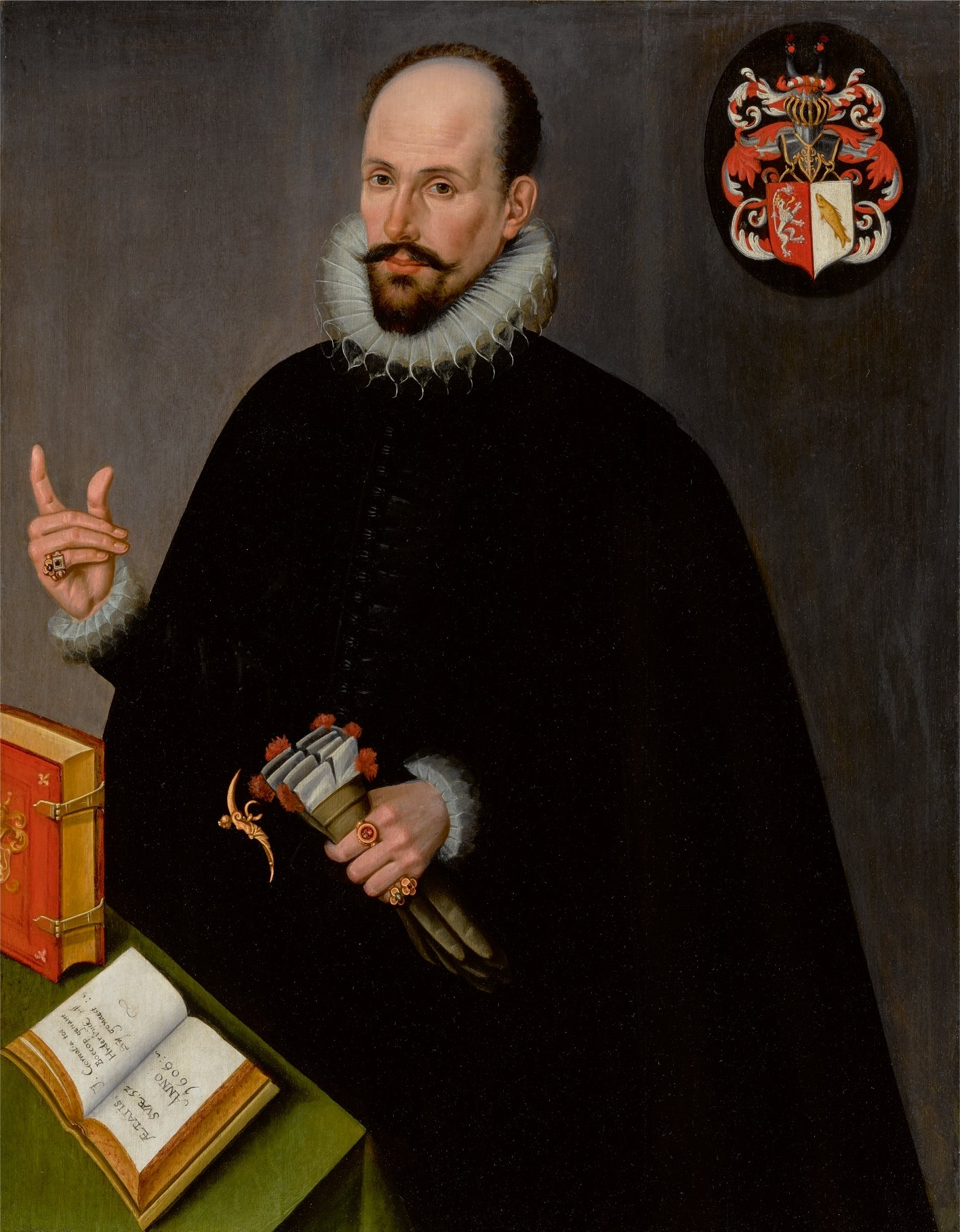
Portrait of Ott van Bronckhorst by Cornelia toe Boecop, 1606 (Rijksmuseum)

A portrait of a man from 1595 has been preserved. Based on the coat of arms that appears on the painting, he has been identified as a member of the Van der Vecht-van Zuilen van Nijevelt family. It is signed "Iov. Cornelia toe Boecop me faecit an. 1595." This inscription seems to indicate that Cornelia continued painting after she was married, just as her mother had. In addition, two other works, a "Portrait of a Woman" and a "Crucifixion" from 1593, have been preserved. After the restoration of the "Crucifixion," a museum exhibition entitled “Depicted Suffering” was held at the Stedelijk Museum Kampen in 2006.

Cornelia toe Boecop is the only painter-daughter of Mechtelt van Lichtenberg who was mentioned by Johan van Beverwijck in his work Van de wtnementheyt des Vrouwelicken genera, (On the excellence of the female sex) published in 1643. He praised her mother, who he identified as Mechtelt Boecop, as a talented painter, and said: "her daughter Cornelia van Boecop also understood the same art, and she was still alive, being very old, in the year 1629." Her life remains unknown apart from her two marriages and remaining works of art.

She lived much of her life in Kampen and died sometime between 1630 and 1634 in Sint-Michielsgestel.

== Works ==
Four of Cornelia's works are known to exist.

- Crucifixion (1593), Stedelijk Museum Kampen
- Portrait of a Woman, Stedelijk Museum Kampen
- Portrait of a Man from the Van der Vecht-van Zuilen van Nijevelt family, Stedelijk Museum Kampen
- Portrait of Ott van Bronckhorst (1606), Rijksmuseum
