= Cornelia Loomis Hull =

American philanthropist (1904-2001)

- Cornelia Loomis in the 1925 yearbook of Barnard College
- Born: Cornelia Steward Loomis; August 28, 1904; Ashville, New York, U.S.
- Died: December 20, 2001 (aged 97); Santa Fe, New Mexico, U.S.
- Occupations: Philanthropist, clubwoman, activist
- Spouses: Harmon Hull

Cornelia Steward Loomis Hull (August 28, 1904 – December 20, 2001) was an American social justice activist, clubwoman and philanthropist, based in Wisconsin and New Mexico.

== Early life and education ==
Loomis was from Ashville, New York, the daughter of Edwin Steward Loomis and Josephine Alice Glidden Loomis. She graduated from Barnard College in 1925.

== Career ==
Hull worked as a bacteriologist in New York, and taught at the University of Texas Medical Branch in Galveston, as a young woman. She served on the Wisconsin Governor's Commission on Human Rights during the administrations of four different governors, working with chair Rebecca Chalmers Barton. Hull was active in the League of Women Voters in Wisconsin, and a founding member of the Waupun Council on Human Relations when it was formed in 1949. The Waupun Council was an outreach to migrant agricultural workers, meant to be a demonstration project in Wisconsin. The council opened a bilingual school, a clinic, a housing program, and a swimming pool for the children those seasonal workers. She also co-founded the Waupun Arts Council and the Waupun Area Craft Center.

When they retired to Santa Fe in 1968, Hull and her husband were active in Habitat for Humanity, Bread for the Journey, and other community programs. She was a founder of the Santa Fe Farmers' Market, Los Vecinos (a neighborhood association), and the United Church of Santa Fe. She was active in the textile department of the Museum of International Folk Art and the Spanish Colonial Arts Society. The Hulls were named Santa Fe Living Treasures in 1988.

== Personal life ==
Cornelia Loomis married physician Harmon Hull in 1930. The Hulls had four sons. Her husband died in 1988, and she died in 2001, at the age of 97, in Santa Fe.
