= Kornelia =

Kornelia or Kornélia is a given name of European origin. It is similar to Cornelia and Korneliya.

Notable people with the name include:

- Kornelia Ender (born 1958), East German swimmer
- Kornelia Fiedkiewicz (born 2001), Polish swimmer
- Kornelia Gressler (born 1970), East German swimmer
- Kornelia Grosicka (born 1999), Polish footballer
- Kornélia Hollósy (1827–1890), Hungarian soprano
- Kornélia Ihász (1937–2022), Hungarian speed skater
- Kornelia Kubińska (born 1985), Polish cross-country skier
- Kornelia Kunisch (born 1959), German handball player
- Kornelia Lesiewicz (born 2003), Polish sprinter
- Kornelia Moskwa (born 1996), Polish volleyball player
- Kornélia Pap (born 1930), Hungarian rower
- Kornelia Polyak, Hungarian-Anerican cancer researcher
- Kornélia Pongo (born 1976), Hungarian ice dancer
- Kornélia Prielle (1826–1906), Hungarian actress
- Kornelia Shilunga (born 1970), Namibian politician
- Kornelia Smalla (born 1956), Chemist
- Kornelia Stawicka (born 1973), Polish swimmer
- Kornelia Strzelecka (born 1993), Polish actress and model
