= Cornelia Willius-Senzer =

German dance instructor and politician (born 1943)

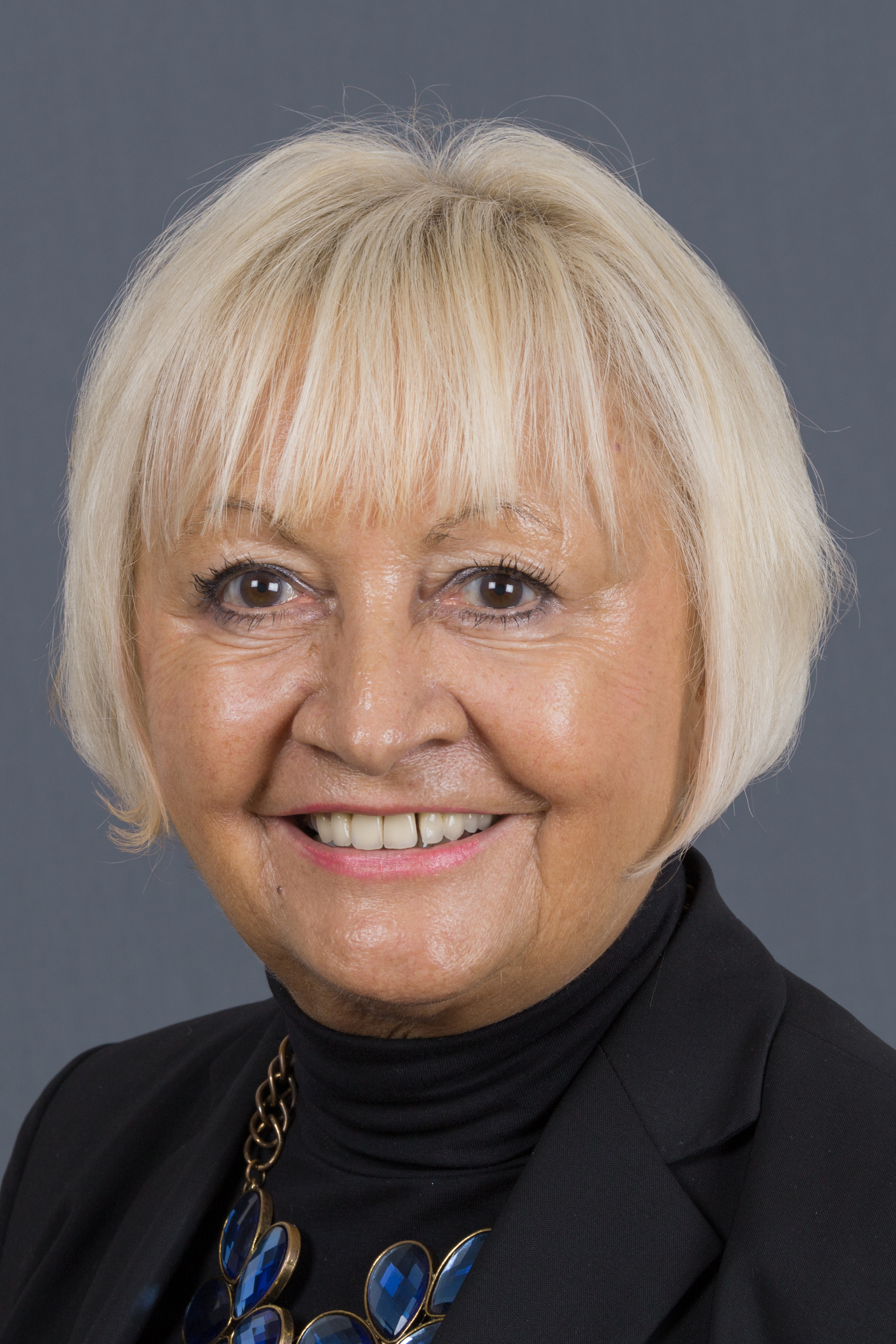
Cornelia Willius-Senzer in 2016

Cornelia Willius-Senzer (born 13 July 1943) is a German entrepreneur, dance instructor and politician (FDP). She was the chair of the FDP parliamentary group in the Landtag of Rhineland-Palatinate from 2017 to 2021.

== Life and dance career ==
Willius-Senzer, née Scherning, was born in Mainz. In her youth, she studied languages and worked as an interpreter in Paris. In 1971 she met her future husband, dance studio heir Horst Willius-Senzer, who asked to marry her on the condition that she had to become a dance instructor. She is honorary president of the Allgemeiner Deutscher Tanzlehrerverband, the association of German ballroom dance instructors, and president of the European Dance Council.

== Career in politics ==
Willius-Senzer entered politics as a FDP member in 2003. She was elected a member of the Landtag in the 2016 Rhineland-Palatinate state election. As Mother of the House, she opened the parliamentary session. In 2017, she was elected chair of the FDP group. In the 2021 Rhineland-Palatinate state election, Willius-Senzer retained her seat, elected as third on her party's statewide list. She continued in her role as Mother of the House, opening the first session of the new parliament, but was succeeded as chair of the party's parliamentary group by Daniela Schmitt in March 2021.
