= Kornelin =

Kornelin may refer to the following places:

- Kornelin, Kuyavian-Pomeranian Voivodeship (north-central Poland)
- Kornelin, Łódź Voivodeship (central Poland)
- Kornelin, Masovian Voivodeship (east-central Poland)
- Kornelin, Greater Poland Voivodeship (west-central Poland)
