= Kees (surname) =

Kees is a surname. Notable persons with that name include:

- Duane Kees (born 1975), American attorney
- Frederick Kees (1852-1927), American architect
- Ryan Kees (born 1985), American footballer
- Weldon Kees (1914-1955), American poet

== See also ==
- Kees (given name)
