= Cornelia Ghijben =

Dutch actress (1733–1790)

- Born: 1733; Amsterdam
- Died: 1790 (aged 56–57); Amsterdam
- Other name: Miss Bouhon
- Occupations: Actress, singer
- Children: 5
- Mother: Elisabeth Mooij

Cornelia Ghijben (1733 – 1790), also known by her married name Miss Bouhon, was a Dutch actress and singer. She was known for her "stately beauty" and often received favorable reviews from contemporary critics and became a well-paid stage performer in the Netherlands in the 18th century.

== Biography ==
Cornelia was born to the oyster merchant Robbert Ghijben and the actress Elisabeth Mooij, an acclaimed stage performer. The couple had at least two daughters and several sons. Cornelia's exact birthdate remains unknown but she was baptized in Amsterdam on 27 December 1733.

=== Career ===
On 12 May 1752, Cornelia Ghijben was signed to an acting contract for the Amsterdamse Schouwburg theater by her mother for the coming season; the contract concerned appearances by both mother, Elisabeth, and daughter, Cornelia. The resulting theater performance by the twenty-year-old Cornelia took place on 16 September in the role of the mythical Ismene in Scilla, a tragedy by Lucas Rotgans. In 1753, she was paid one guilder for each performance.

In May 1755, Elisabeth Mooij signed a new contract with the Schouwburg for herself and her two daughters, Cornelia and Maria Elisabeth Ghijben. Shortly thereafter, Cornelia promised to marry Johannes Bouhon. On 8 May 1756, Cornelia and Johannes signed their own joint contract with the Schouwburg. They had at least five children and the two eldest, Johannes and Cornelia Bouhon, went on have their own careers on the stage.

During the 1759 theater season, Ghijben and her husband received ten guilders for each performance in addition to a recognition fee of 250 guilders. Cornelia often played the leading roles, but both spouses also appeared as extras. During the annual summer closings, they traveled with other Amsterdam performers to annual fairs where they appeared on stage. In 1772, the Schouwburg burned down forcing the actors to work in Rotterdam. Two years later, when the new Amsterdam Theatre was rebuilt, the theatre signed "Cornelia Ghijben, whose presence as the first actress was considered 'utterly necessary,' for 1200 guilders, her husband as a dancer for 522 guilders and the children, 'people of expectation,' for 400 guilders each." As a result, on 17 September 1774, during the opening performance of the new theater, the entire Bouhon family stood on stage.

Cornelia Ghijben remained active at Amsterdamse Schouwburg for more than 30 years (1752–1784) but also appeared elsewhere in the Netherlands.

After Cornelia left the theater in 1784, her whereabouts became unknown. She is said to have died in 1790.

=== Scandalous verse ===
In 1753, a six-line poem signed Castigatico (Spanish, meaning punishment) became public. The man described in the poem "is accused of having 'recently' defiled a girl after having committed adultery with her mother on a regular basis. An added footnote shows that the girl is Cornelia Ghijben. It is not possible to determine how much of this is true." While the poem was probably aimed at the man described in the verse, Cornelia and her mother, Elisabeth, became victims. In spite of the resulting cloud of public speculation, they both continued their acting careers.

=== Personal life ===
Cornelia Ghijben was pledged in a pre-marriage agreement to wed Johannes Bouhon, on 7 August 1755. That marriage was dissolved due to the couple's "different moods and disagreement" on 21 May 1777 in Amsterdam.
