= Cornelia de Rijck =

Dutch artist (1653–1726)

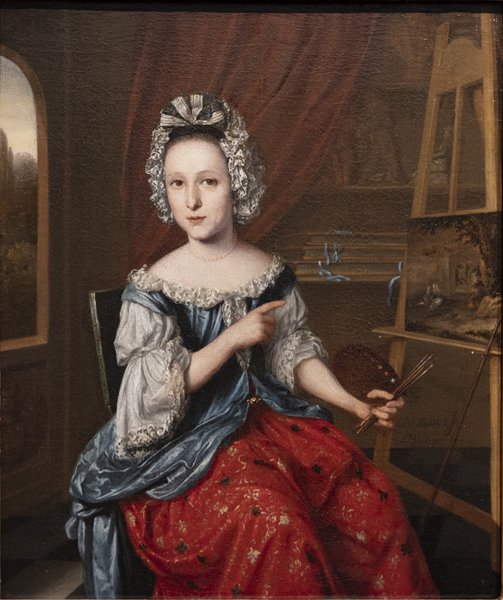
- Portrait of Cornelia before her easel, by her husband, in 1689
- Born: October 14, 1653; Amsterdam, Dutch Republic
- Died: October 11, 1726 (aged 72); Amsterdam, Dutch Republic
- Known for: Bird painting
- Spouse(s): Gerrit van Goor 1688; Simon Schijnvoet 1697

Cornelia de Rijck (11 October 1653 – 4 October 1726) was a Dutch Golden Age painter specialized in painting birds and insects.

== Biography ==
She was born in Amsterdam as the daughter of Dirck Jansz. de Rijck and Ariaantje Wessels. She married Gerrit van Goor in 1688, followed by a second marriage to Simon Schijnvoet in 1697. Her first husband was a portrait painter who painted her portrait, and together they taught the artist Gerrit Rademaker who continued to follow lessons from her as a widow.

She is known for her meticulous studies of insects, 116 of which are in a portfolio in the Stockholm archives. Her paintings have been compared to those of Melchior d'Hondecoeter. She died in Amsterdam.

== Gallery ==
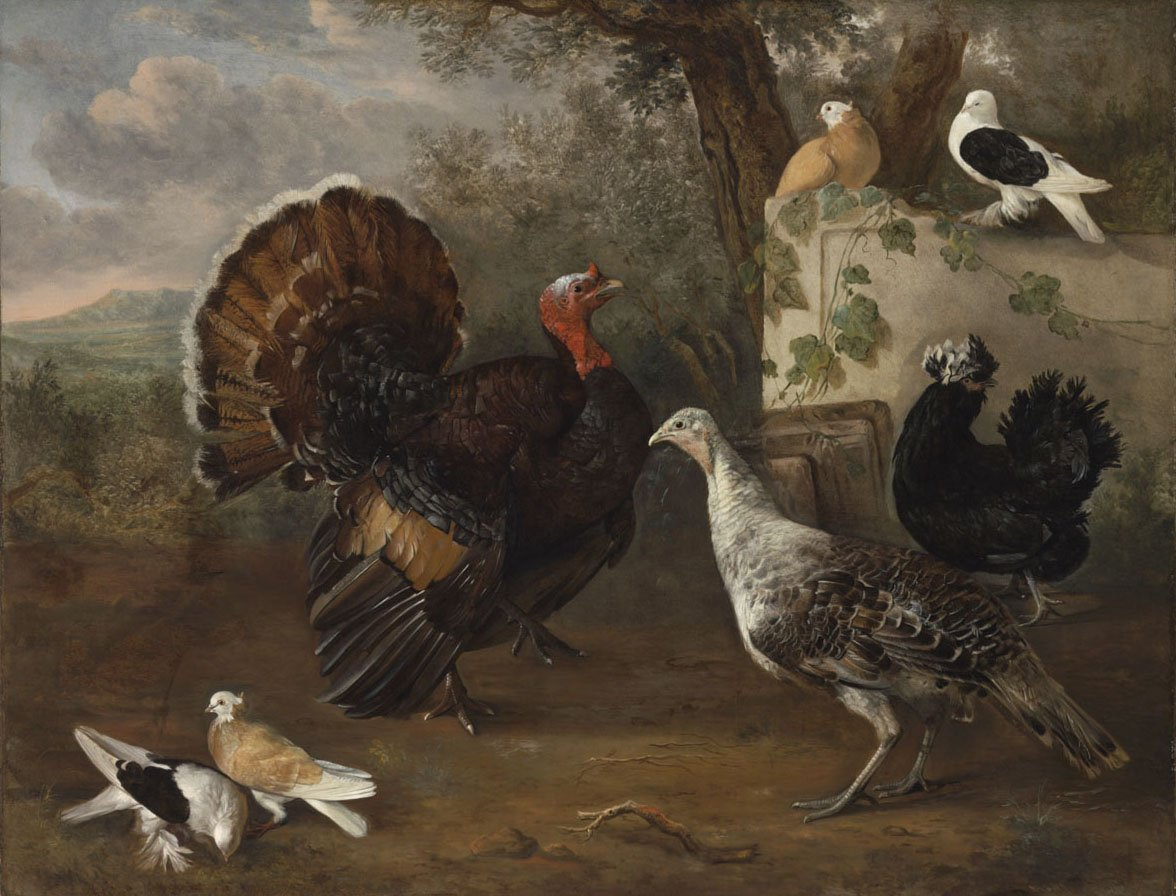
Fowl, Museum of Fine Arts, Budapest

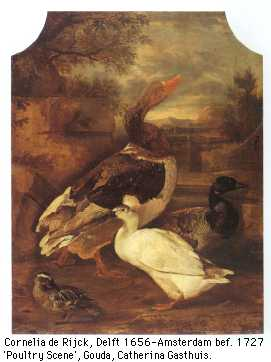
Poultry Yard, Museum Gouda
