= Kernell =

Kernell may refer to:

- Amanda Kernell (born 1986), Swedish, Southern Sami director and screenwriter
- Mike Kernell (1951- ), American politician
