= Ryan Kees =

American football player (born 1986)

Profile
- Position: Defensive end

Personal information
- Born: April 2, 1986 (age 40); Eagan, Minnesota
- Listed height: 6 ft 6 in (1.98 m)
- Listed weight: 275 lb (125 kg)

Career information
- High school: Eagan (MN)
- College: St. Cloud State
- NFL draft: 2009: undrafted

Career history
- Detroit Lions (2009)*; California Redwoods (2009); Arizona Cardinals (2010)*
- * Offseason or practice squad member only

Awards and highlights
- First-team All-NSIC (2008)

Ryan Ed Kees (born April 2, 1986) is an American former football defensive end. He was signed by the Detroit Lions as an undrafted free agent in 2009, later played for the California Redwoods, and was briefly with the Arizona Cardinals. He played college football at St. Cloud State.

== Early life ==
Ryan learned of his talents as a football player while playing in E.A.A. (Eagan Athletic Association) and his skills excelled while playing defensive end for Eagan High School in Eagan, Minnesota under esteemed head coach Dave Fritze. As a high school student Ryan donated his time to E.A.A. football by refereeing games for 3rd to 6th graders.

Kees played college football at the St. Cloud University. Several accolades Kees received were DII First-team All American (2008), two time NCC All-Conference, one time NSIC All-Conference, and St. Cloud State Male athlete of the year ('09).

== Professional football ==
=== Detroit Lions ===
After going undrafted in the 2009 NFL draft, Kees signed with the Detroit Lions as an undrafted free agent. He was waived, but not before recording an important tackle in preseason. Ryan tackled a scrambling John Parker Wilson for the Atlanta Falcons to force a punt that was the start of a game-winning drive for the Detroit Lions.

Kees was re-signed by the Lions on May 15, 2009, but waived on August 31, 2009.

=== California Redwoods ===
Kees was signed by the California Redwoods of the United Football League September 28, 2009, but was released on October 13.

=== Arizona Cardinals ===
Kees was signed to the practice squad of the Arizona Cardinals on January 4, 2010. He was re-signed to a future contract on January 18, 2010, but released on July 15, 2010.

== Personal life ==
Ryan and his wife were featured on a 2016 episode of House Hunters, titled "Moving Up in Minneapolis".
