= Cornelia Ebert =

German linguist and semanticist

Cornelia Ebert (born 1976) is a German linguist who is professor of semantics at the Goethe University Frankfurt.

== Education ==
Ebert studied general linguistics, computational linguistics and political science at Heidelberg University in 1996–1997 before moving to the University of Potsdam to study computational linguistics between 1997 and 2001. Her doctorate was awarded in 2007 by the same institution; her advisors there were Peter Staudacher, Manfred Krifka and Thomas Ede Zimmermann.

== Career and honours ==
Ebert held postdoctoral research and teaching positions at Osnabrück University (2007–2009) and the University of Stuttgart (2010–2017). In 2017 she moved to the Leibniz Centre for General Linguistics where she led a project on the pragmatic status of iconic meaning in spoken communication. In 2019 she was appointed to a tenure-track professorship in linguistics at the Goethe University Frankfurt. Since 2020 she has additionally been a co-opted professor of philosophy at the same institution, and in 2022 she received tenure as a full (W3) professor of linguistics and semantics. In 2025 she was elected as a member of the Academia Europaea.

== Research ==
Ebert works in the areas of formal semantics and formal pragmatics, including information structure. She has made various contributions across these subfields, but is best known for her work on multimodality and on the semantics of gesture. Together with Markus Steinbach, she has led the German Research Council's Priority Program 2392 Visual Communication: Theoretical, Empirical, and Applied Perspectives (ViCom) since 2021.

== Selected publications and talks ==
- Götze, Michael, Thomas Weskott, Cornelia Endriss, Ines Fiedler, Stefan Hinterwimmer, Svetlana Petrova, Anne Schwarz, Stavros Skopeteas, & Ruben Stoel. 2007. Information structure. Interdisciplinary studies on information structure: ISIS 7, 147–187. ISBN 9783939469667
- Carstensen, Kai-Uwe, Christian Ebert, Cornelia Ebert, Susanne Jekat, Ralf Klabunde, & Hagen Langer. 2009. Computerlinguistik und Sprachtechnologie: Eine Einführung (Computaional linguistics and language technology: an introduction). 3rd edition. Heidelberg: Springer. ISBN 9783827422248
- Ebert, Cornelia, & Christian Ebert. 2014. Gestures, demonstratives, and the attributive/referential distinction. Handout of a talk given at Semantics and Philosophy in Europe (SPE 7), Berlin.
- Ebert, Christian, Cornelia Ebert & Robin Hörnig. 2020. Demonstratives as dimension shifters. Proceedings of Sinn und Bedeutung 24, 161–178. doi:10.18148/sub/2020.v24i1.859
- Ebert, Cornelia. 2024. Semantics of gesture. Annual Review of Linguistics 10, 169–189. doi:10.1146/annurev-linguistics-022421-063057
