= Cornelia F. Maury =

American painter

- Born: Cornelia Field Maury; 1866; New Orleans, Louisiana, U.S.
- Died: 1942 (aged 75–76); St. Louis, Missouri, U.S.
- Education: Washington University in St. Louis, Académie Julian
- Known for: Portrait painting

Cornelia Field Maury (1866–1942) was an American artist, known for her portraits of children. Maury often worked in pastels. She was based in St. Louis, Missouri.

== About ==
Cornelia Field Maury was born in New Orleans, Louisiana in 1866. Her family had owned a theatre in St. Louis, Missouri. She studied at the St. Louis School of Fine Arts (a part of Washington University in St. Louis) and the Académie Julian in Paris. She studied in France with Jules Joseph Lefebvre, Raphaël Collin, Benjamin Constant, Jean-Paul Laurens, Luc-Olivier Merson, and Jules Dupré.

She was a member of St. Louis Artists' Guild and Society of Western Artists. In 1899, Maury was exhibiting her work at the St. Louis Artists' Guild. Her work "Mother and Child" was hung in 1900 at the Salon des Artistes Francais.

She lived in St. Louis in her family home, the historical Guion House (also referred to as the Maury House) at 5815 Pennsylvania Ave in the Carondelet neighborhood.

== Death and legacy ==
She died in 1942, in Saint Louis, Missouri. However her year of death has been incorrectly attributed with many other dates, and as early as 1934.

Her work is in many public museum collections including Smithsonian American Art Museum, among others.
