= Cor Kammeraad =

Dutch politician (1902–1978)

Member of the House of Representatives
- In office 31 July 1963 – 21 February 1967
- Preceded by: Edzo Toxopeus

Member of the Provincial Council of Zeeland
- In office 27 June 1961 – 1 June 1966

Member of the Middelburg Municipal Council
- In office 2 September 1958 – 2 September 1974

Member of the Koudekerke Municipal Council
- In office 3 September 1935 – 31 August 1941

Personal details
- Born: Cornelis Adrianus Kammeraad; 14 January 1902 Hazerswoude, Netherlands
- Died: 20 October 1978 (aged 76) Middelburg, Netherlands
- Party: People's Party for Freedom and Democracy
- Other political affiliations: Middle Class Party; Gemeentebelangen

Cornelis Adrianus "Cor" Kammeraad (Dutch: [kɔr kɑməˈraːt]; 14 January 1902 – 20 October 1978) was a Dutch politician of the conservative-liberal People's Party for Freedom and Democracy (VVD). Born in Hazerswoude, he worked as a grain merchant and owned a gristmill in Middelburg starting in 1923. He served on the Koudekerke Municipal Council between 1935 and 1941, representing the local Gemeentebelangen party, and on the Middelburg Municipal Council between 1958 and 1974. He simultaneously sat on the Provincial Council of Zeeland from 1961 until 1966. Kammeraad first ran for the House of Representatives in the 1952 general election as the second candidate of the Middle Class Party. On 31 July 1963, while he was chairman of the Chamber of Commerce and Factories of the Zeelandic Islands, he replaced Edzo Toxopeus as a member of parliament. His term ended 21 February 1967. Kammeraad died in Middelburg in 1978 at the age of 76.
