= Cornelia van Wulfschkercke =

Flemish artist (died 1540)

Full page illumination by Cornelia van Wulfschkercke in the missal of Abbot Christiaan de Hondt of Ten Duinen Abbey (Bruges, Major Seminary, Ms. 55/66, f. 46bisv).

Cornelia van Wulfschkercke (unknown, 14.. - Bruges, 15 april 1540) was a Flemish miniaturist who worked in the workshop of the Carmelite convent of Sion in Bruges. She is one of the few late-medieval female miniaturists whose artworks have survived and are still documented today.

== Biography ==
Van Wulfschkercke first appears in the archives in 1495 as a postulant in the convent of Sion in Bruges. In 1501 she took her vows as a Carmelite nun in this convent. She died on 15 April 1540 in Bruges.

== Career ==
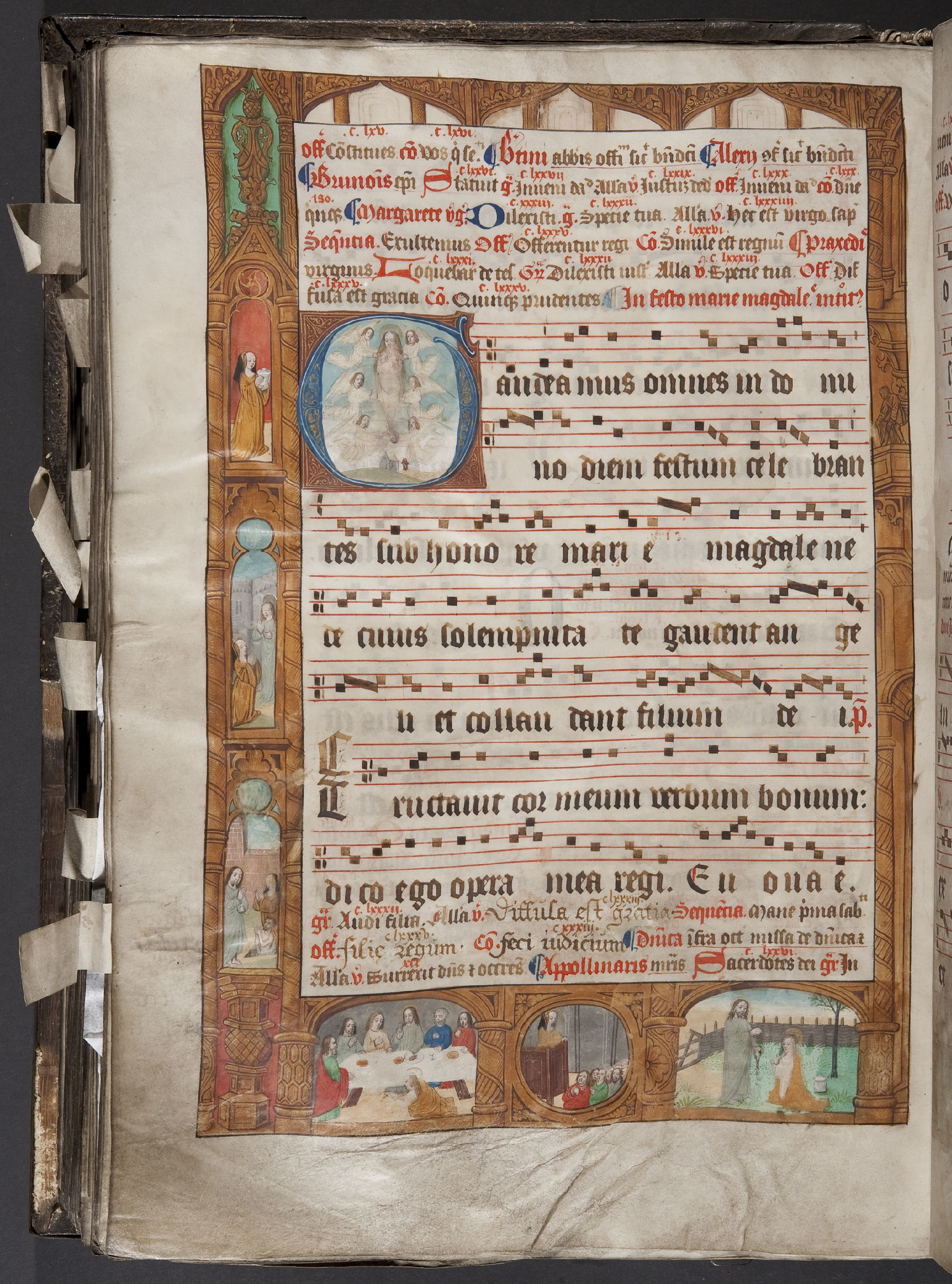
Inhabited initial and decorated margins in a gradual for the Leprosery of Magdalen in Bruges, painted by Cornelia van Wulfschkercke. (Bruges, Public Library, Ms. 783, f. 149v)

At the end of the fifteenth century and the beginning of the sixteenth century, a workshop of copyists and manuscript illuminators was established in the Bruges convent of Sion. According to the convent’s archives, Cornelia van Wulfschkercke was working in this workshop as a copyist by 1495 at the latest. She was trained as a manuscript illuminator by Grietkin Scheppers, a professional illuminator and laywoman who was a member of the Bruges guild of librariërs (book producers). In turn, Cornelia van Wulfschkercke trained another nun, Margriet van Rye. Her first documented work dates from 1505. The colophon of this manuscript, a gradual for the convent of Sion, explicitly mentions her as the illuminator of the work. This manuscript is used in research on Van Wulfschkercke’s oeuvre as a reference point.

== Works ==
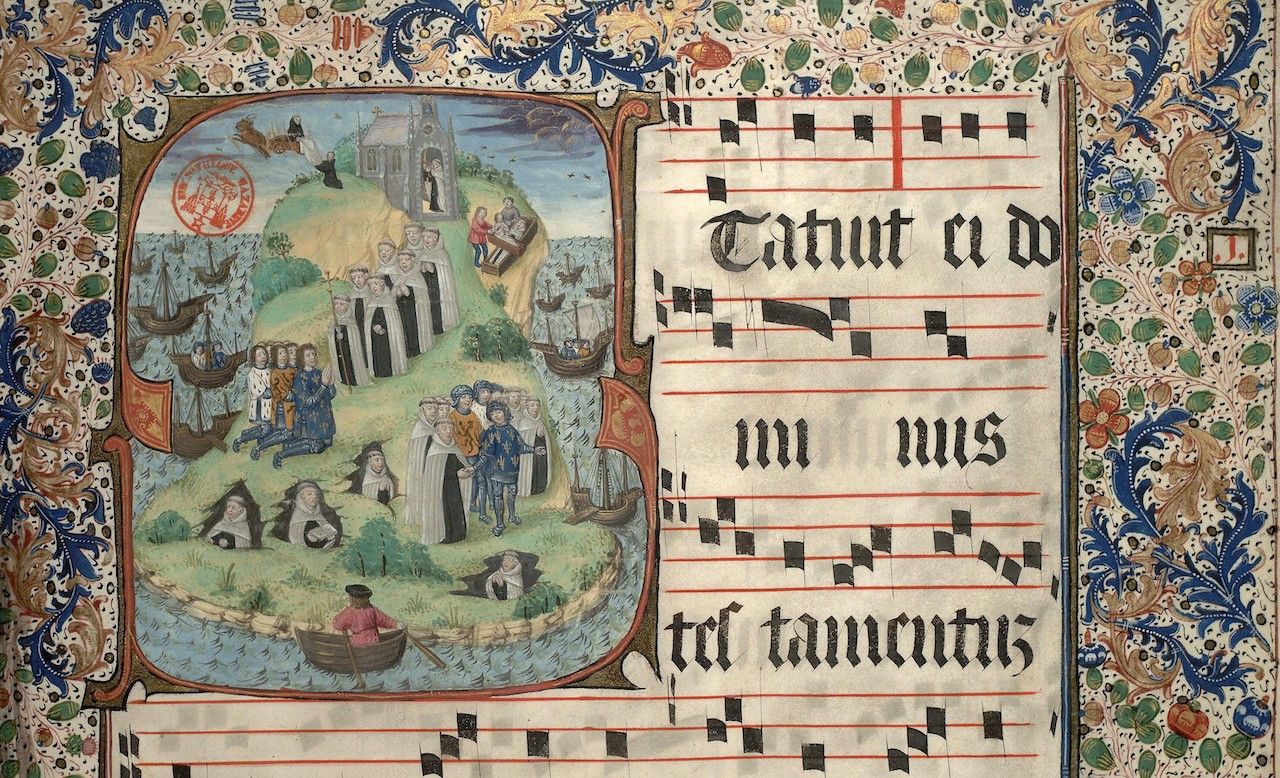
Inhabited initial 'S' in a gradual for the convent of Sion in Bruges, painted by Cornelia van Wulfschkercke. (Paris, Bibliothèque Mazarine, Ms. 390 f.1r)

Alain Arnould and Anne Margreet As-Vijvers, the researchers who have studied the stylistic characteristics of her work most extensively, attribute 23 works to her. Compared with other miniaturists of that period—especially a woman—this is a high number. She produced books for, among others:

- the Spanish-Flemish family Ayala-Rodriguez,
- Abbot Raphael de Mercatellis of the Ghent Saint Bavo’s Abbey,
- Abbot Christiaan de Hondt of Ten Duinen Abbey,
- the Bruges Magdalene leper hospital (Magdalene leprosarium).

== Style ==
Stylistically, her work aligns with that of the Masters of Raphael de Mercatellis, with whom she also collaborated regularly.

== Literature ==
- Arnould, A. (1998). De la production de miniatures de Cornelia van Wulfschkercke au couvent des carmélites de Sion à Bruges, Brussels
- As-Vijvers, A.M. (2013). ‘Manuscript Production in a Carmelite Convent: The Case of Cornelia van Wulfschkercke’, in S. Hindman & J. Marrow (red.), Books of Hours Reconsidered, Turnhout, p. 279-296, 519-520.
- Gil, M. (2011). ‘Les femmes dans les métiers d’art des Pays-Bas bourguignons au XVe siècle’, Clio. Femmes, Genre, Histoire, 34(2), 231-254.
- Hauwaerts, E. 'Cornelia van Wulfschkercke en vrouwen in het laatmiddeleeuwse boekenbedrijf', in België in 100 voorwerpen. Tielt: Lannoo. 2024.
- Rossignol, S. (2017). 'Visualizing Reading Practices in the Late Middle Ages: Images in a Book of Hours Held at Memorial University', Florilegium, Volume 34, 90-118
- Vandamme, L. (1998). ‘Een bibliotheek in het karmelietessenklooster Sion’, in Vandamme, L. (red.), Een stad vol boeken: Bibliotheken en leescultuur in Brugge in de 16de eeuw, Bruges, p. 13-16.
- van der Stighelen, K., Meijer, M., & Westen, M. (1999). Elck zijn waerom: vrouwelijke kunstenaars in België en Nederland 1500-1950. Ghent: Ludion.
- Vanwijnsberghe, D. (2015). ‘L’Antiphonaire d’Oosteeklo et son enlumineur (Cornelia van Wulfschkercke?)’, CeROArt - Conservation, exposition, restauration d'objets d'arts, Hors série: Mélanges en l’honneur de Roger Marijnissen [Online journal] URL: http://journals.openedition.org/ceroart/4749; DOI: https://doi.org/10.4000/ceroart.4749
- Vertonghen, S. (1997). 'Graduale', Vlaamse miniaturen voor vorsten en burgers, 1475-1550 (exhib. cat.), Ghent, nr. 31, p. 188-189
