= Wittmund =

- Town
- Flag Coat of arms

- Location of Wittmund within Wittmund district
- Interactive map of Wittmund
- Location within Germany Location within Lower Saxony
- Coordinates: 53°34′30″N 7°46′51″E
- Country: Germany
- State: Lower Saxony
- District: Wittmund
- Subdivisions: 14 districts

Government
  - Mayor (2021–26): Rolf Claußen

Area
  - Total: 210.16 km^{2} (81.14 sq mi)
- Elevation: 4 m (13 ft)

Population (2025-12-31)
  - Total: 19,951
  - Density: 94.932/km^{2} (245.87/sq mi)
- Time zone: UTC+01:00 (CET)
  - Summer (DST): UTC+02:00 (CEST)
- Postal codes: 26409
- Dialling codes: 04462
- Vehicle registration: WTM
- Website: www.wittmund.de

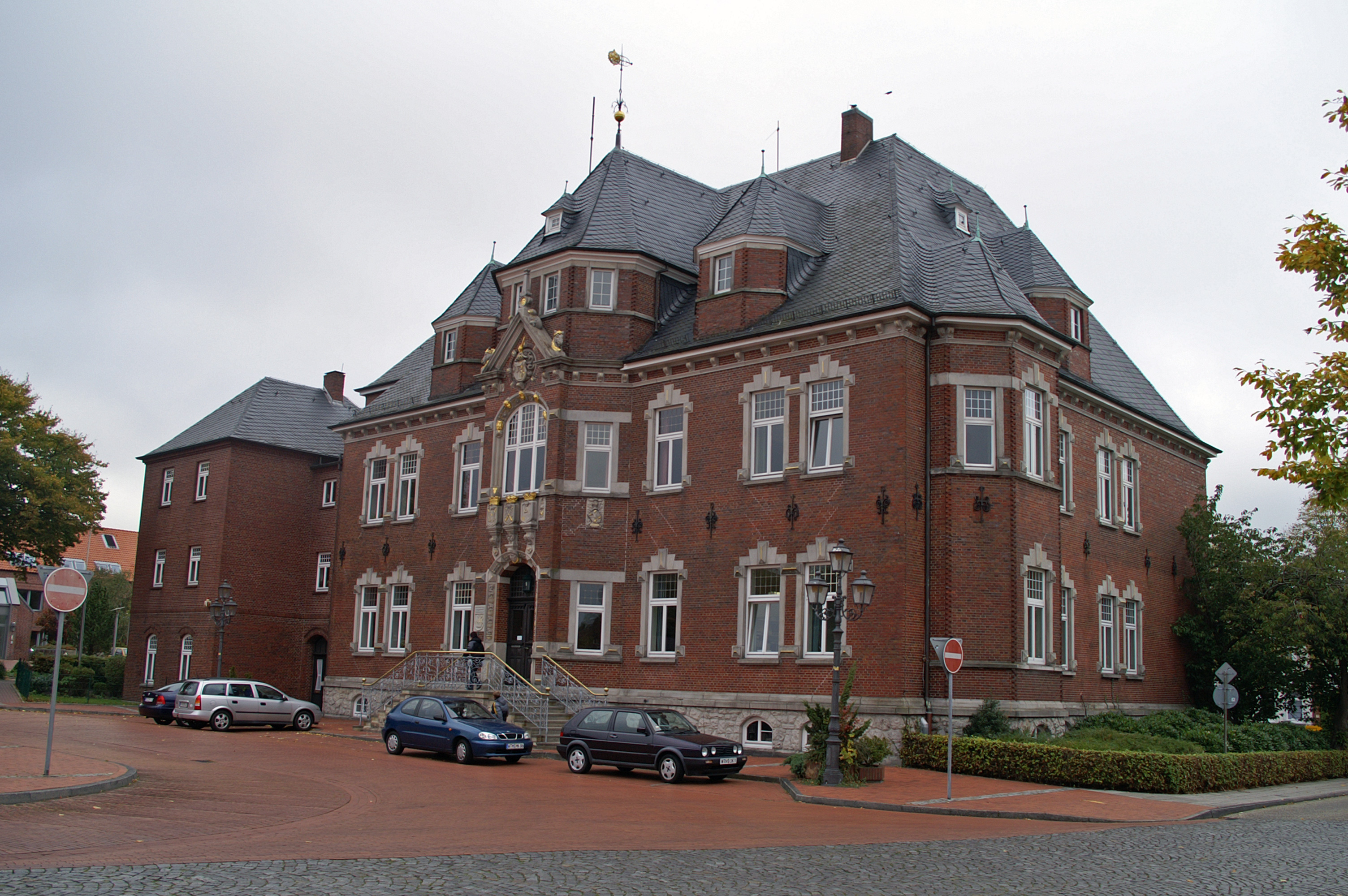
Wittmund

Wittmund (German pronunciation: [ˈvɪtˌmʊnt]) is a town and capital of the district of Wittmund, in Lower Saxony, Germany.

== Geography ==
Wittmund is a town of 21,000 inhabitants located in Germany's historic coastal district of East Frisia, between the towns of Aurich and Jever. The town's borough covers an area of 52,000 acres (210 km^{2}) which make it one of the largest boroughs in Lower Saxony.

While the town of Wittmund is about 9 miles (14 km) from the North Sea coast, its borough includes the little port of Harlesiel which is the starting point for ferries to the island of Wangerooge. Harlesiel is named after the Harle, a small river that starts and finishes within Wittmund borough. (A siel is a sluice in a dyke. At low tide, water from the river may flow into the sea.)

Villages: - Ardorf - Asel - Blersum - Berdum - Burhafe - Buttforde - Carolinensiel - Eggelingen - Funnix - Hovel - Leerhafe - Uttel - Willen

Towns: - Wittmund

== Mayor ==
Since November 1, 2006, Rolf Claußen is the mayor of Wittmund. He was reelected in 2014.

== History ==
The town of Wittmund, on the edge of the geest, and its surroundings are an ancient area of settlement. It was linked to inland East Frisia's network of roads early on and commercially oriented to the nearby coast. Around 1200, Wittmund was the hub of the rural parish (Landgemeinde) of Wangerland and was called Wiedemund or Wiedemundheim at that time. The territorial units of the rural parishes were based roughly on old Frisian districts. Esens was the administrative centre of the Harlingerland.

The chieftain family of Kankena lived in a castle in the town in the late 14th century. Around 1400, Hamburg forces occupied the castle grounds as a result of allegations that the Kankenas had supported piracy against the Hanseatic city. The release of the castle into the hands of the ruling chieftain family of tom Brok saw the Kankenas regaining possession of their estate.

The subsequent ruler of the Brokmerland, Focko Ukena, cleverly took advantage of the weakness of the Kankenas and enlisted them for military operations in the Battle of the Wild Fields, which he won. In 1454 the castle fell to the ruler of Harlingerland, Sibet Attena. In the same year, Sibet Attena united the rulers of Esens, Stedesdorf and Wittmund in order to ensure the independence of Harlingerland against the East Frisian counts. Not until 1600 was the Harlingerland, including Wittmund, finally joined to East Frisia through political and family mergers.

In 1584, the place is recorded on a card as Witmondt. Later, the town was given a district (Amt) constitution and made into an Amt as part of the new comital order. In 1730 Witmundt is recorded within the Amt of Witmundt on another map. In 1744, East Frisia was absorbed by Prussia, and then, after a brief period under Dutch/French rule, became part of the Kingdom of Hanover in 1815.

Under Hanoverian rule, the Landdrostei emerged, with the Landdrost as the highest state representative in the province. In 1866, East Frisia once again became part of Prussia. The state of Prussia initially took over the Amt structure with its existing Ämter of Aurich, Berum, Emden, Esens, Leer, Stickhausen, Weener and Wittmund. From 1884 they were transferred into the new district (Landkreis) structure. In East Frisia the new districts of Aurich, Emden (independent), Leer, Norden, Weener and Wittmund (1885) were created. Even the former Hanoverian Landdrostei were transformed into administrative provinces (Regierungsbezirke). The district hall was built in Wittmund in 1903.

Wittmund was given town rights as early as 1567 by Agnes, Countess of Rietberg. In the 17th century these rights were rescinded and were not granted again until 1929.

The Luftwaffe's 71st Tactical Fighter Squadron ( Taktisches Luftwaffengeschwader 71 "Richthofen") is based at Wittmundhafen Air Base.

== Economy and infrastructure ==
=== Transport ===
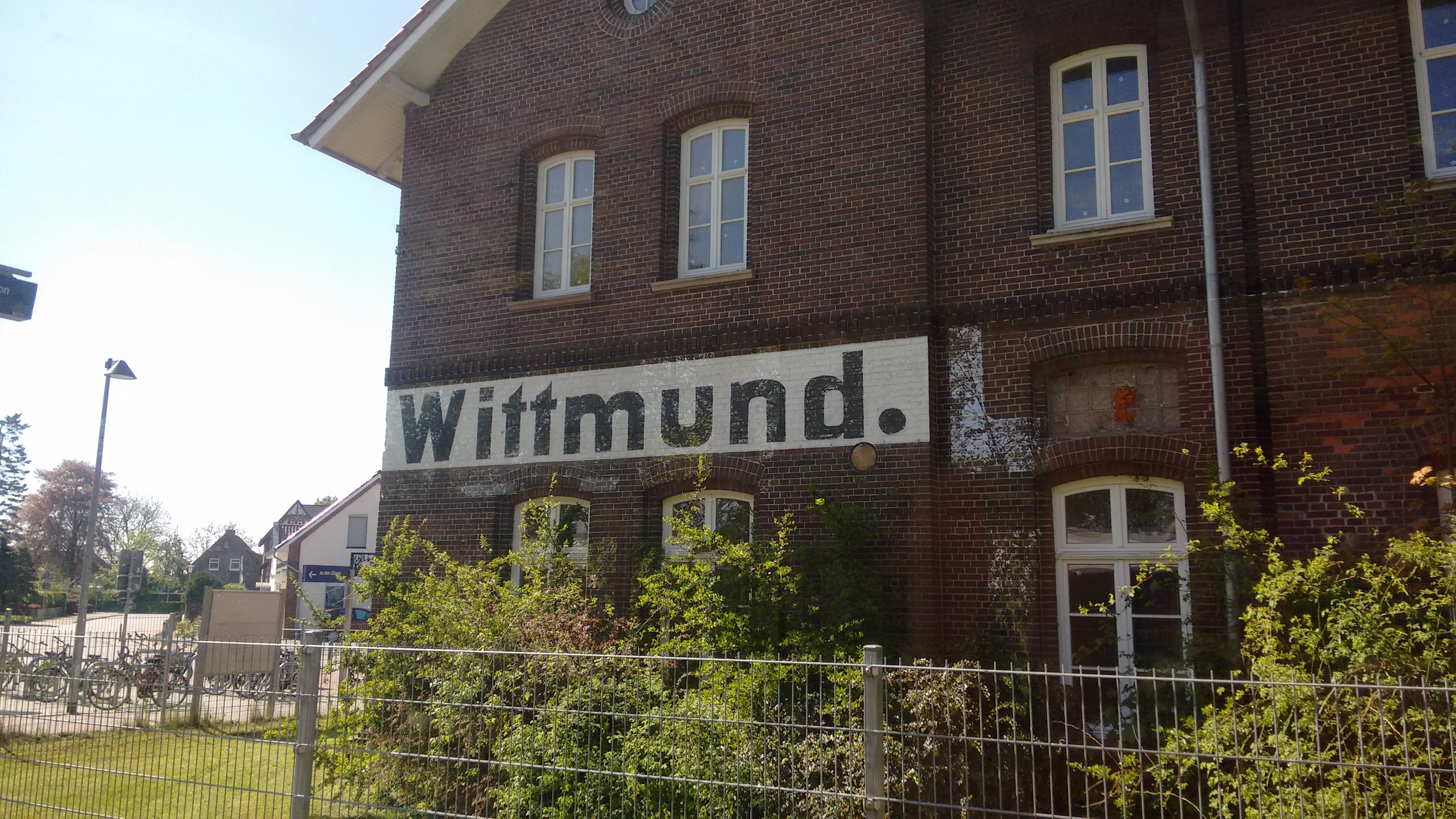
Wittmund station

Wittmund is located on RB59 line (East Frisian coastal railway), which runs from Oldenburg via Sande, Jever, Wittmund and Burhafe to Esens.

Wittmund is located on the area if the transport association Verkehrsverbund Ems-Jade (VEJ), but it's fare only applies for bus rides.

The town is served by local busses as well.

=== Energy ===
Between 2001 and 2016, 15 wind turbines have been constructed in Wittmund.

== Shows ==
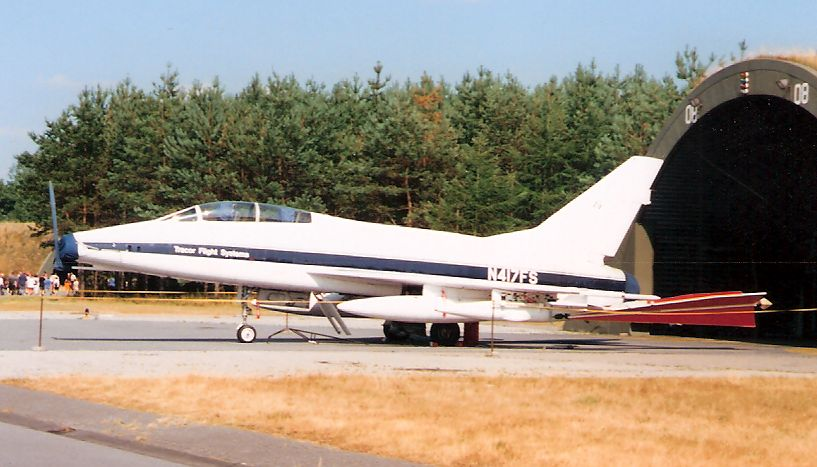
N417FS

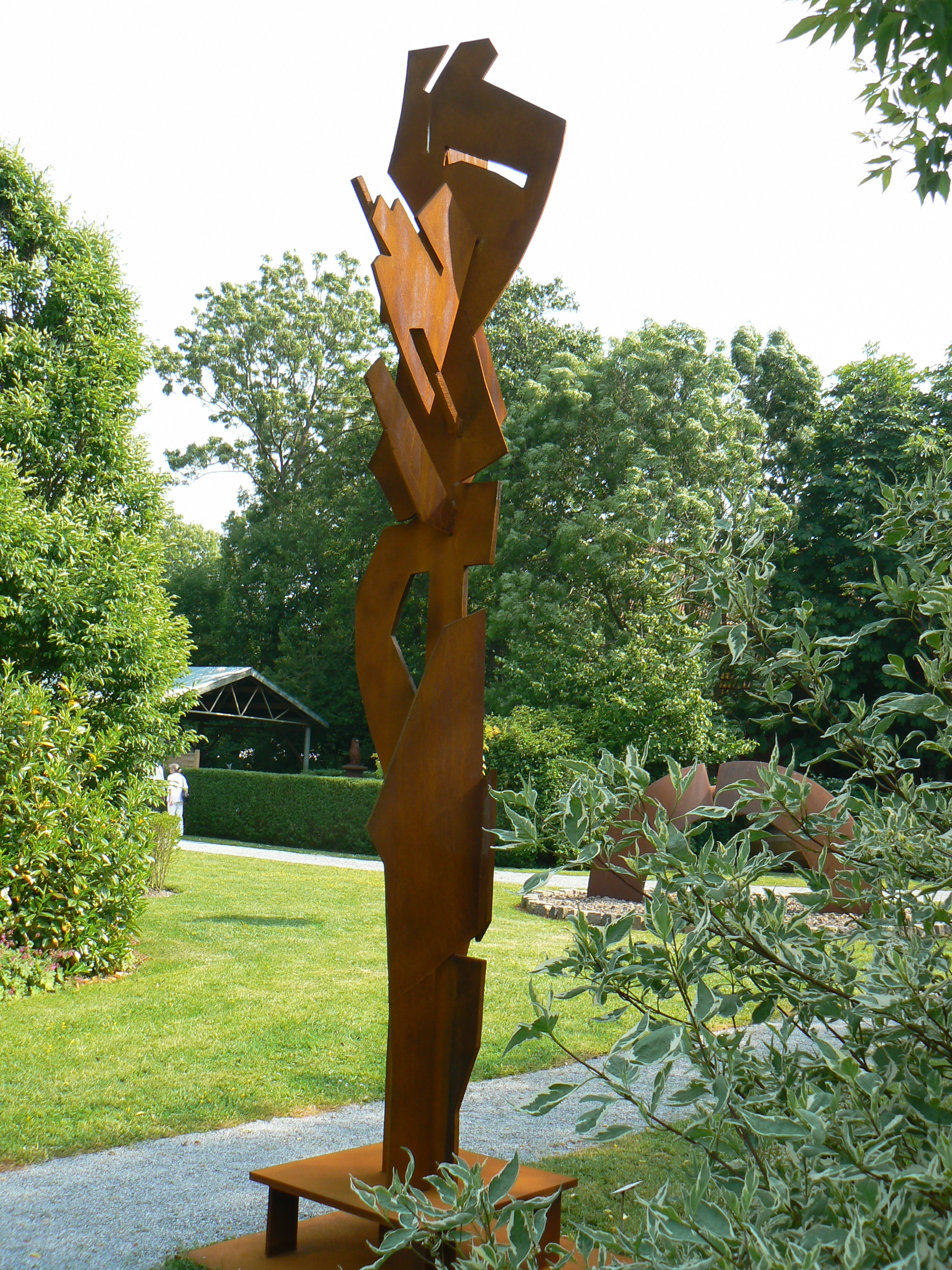
Sculpture Stehende (2000) by Cornelia Weihe

A public event is organized each year by the Luftwaffe.

== International twinnings ==
Wittmund is twinned with:

- Simsbury, Connecticut (United States)

== Notable people ==
- Johan van Angelbeek (1727–1799), a Dutch colonial officer and governor of Colombo, Thoothukudi, Dutch Malabar and Dutch India
- Hans-Wilhelm Müller-Wohlfahrt (born 1942), sports physician of the Germany national football team, 1995 to 2018
- Matthias Rogg (born 1963), German military historian
- Mense Reents, (DE Wiki) (born 1970), musician and record producer
- Henny Reents, (DE Wiki) (born 1974), actress
- Timo Schultz (born 1977), footballer and manager, played 290 games
- Christian Alder (born 1978), footballer, played over 240 games

== See also ==
- Sculpture Garden Funnix
