= Pier Tol =

Dutch footballer

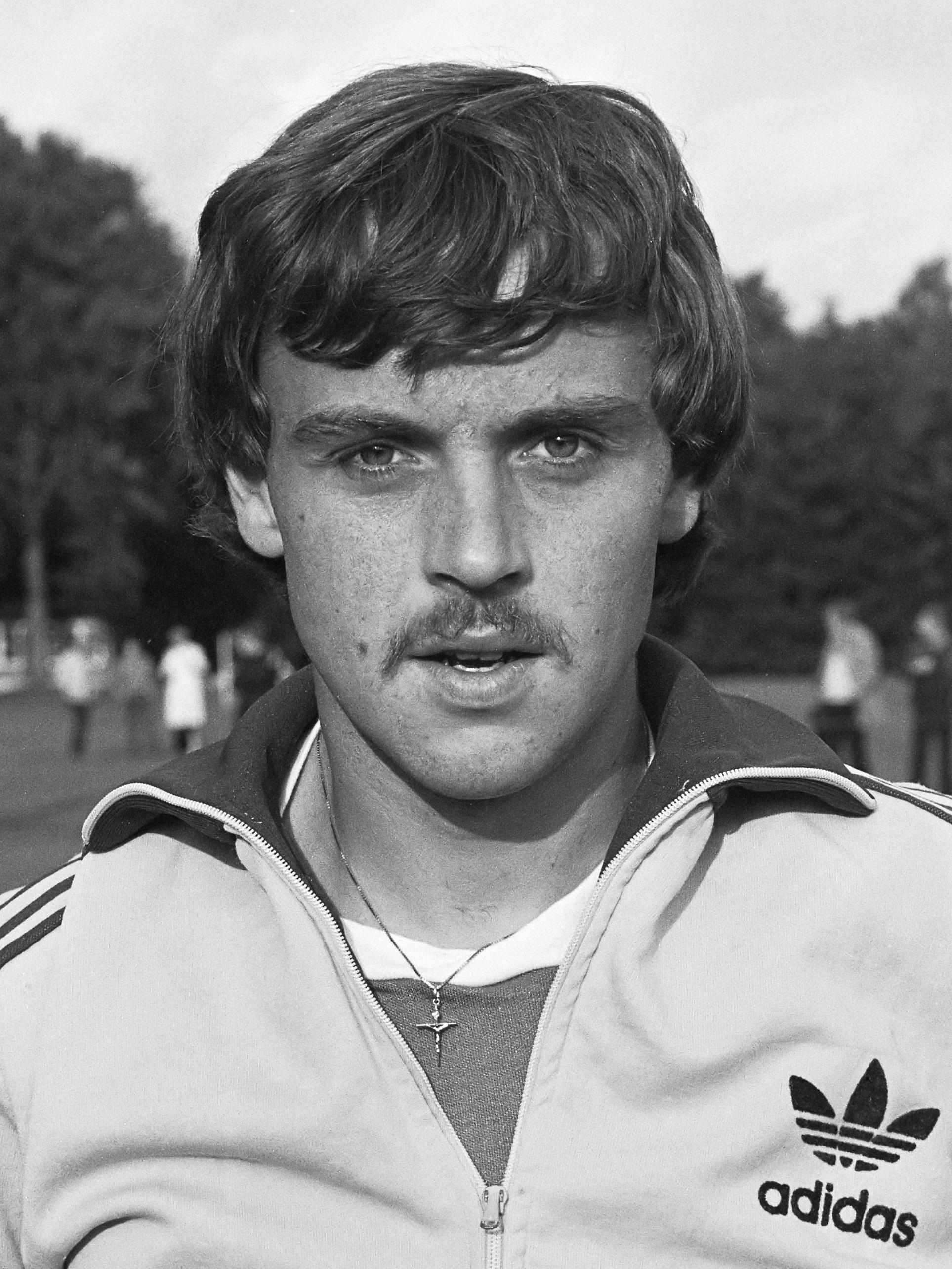
- Tol in 1980

Personal information
- Full name: Kees Tol
- Date of birth: 12 July 1958 (age 68)
- Place of birth: Volendam, Netherlands
- Position: Forward

Senior career*
Years	Team	Apps	(Gls)
1975–1978	FC Volendam	70	(16)
1978–1988	AZ'67	238	(86)
1988–1989	Fortuna Sittard	16	(1)
1989–1990	SVV	20	(5)
Total		344	(108)

International career
1980–1982	Netherlands	5	(0)
- * Club domestic league appearances and goals

Kees "Pier" Tol (born 12 July 1958) is a Dutch retired international footballer who made over 300 professional appearances in the Dutch league, scoring over 100 goals.

== Club career ==
Born in Volendam, Tol played professionally for FC Volendam, AZ'67, Fortuna Sittard and SVV.

== International career ==
Between 1980 and 1982, Tol played five games for the Netherlands national team, including one at the 1980 Mundialito.

== Personal life ==
Tol is the uncle of fellow footballer Kees Tol.
