= Kees Tol (footballer) =

Dutch footballer

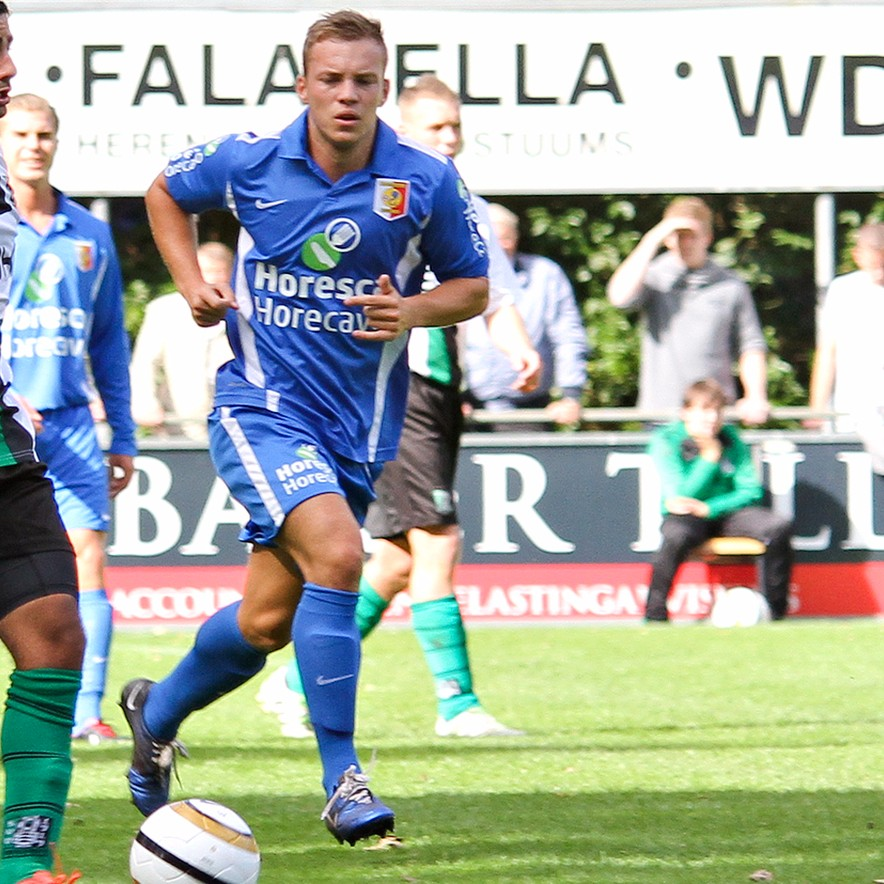
- Tol in 2012

Personal information
- Full name: Kees Pier Tol
- Date of birth: 1 January 1987 (age 39)
- Place of birth: Volendam, Netherlands
- Height: 1.68 m (5 ft 6 in)
- Position: Forward

Team information
- Current team: Go Ahead Kampen

Youth career
- RKAV Volendam

Senior career*
Years	Team	Apps	(Gls)
2008–2009	Cambuur	2	(0)
2009–2010	RKAV Volendam	26	(18)
2010–2012	FC Volendam	37	(4)
2012–2013	VV Noordwijk	30	(26)
2013–2018	SV Spakenburg	149	(82)
2018–2019	VV Spijkenisse		
2019–2020	Alphense Boys		
2020–	Go Ahead Kampen		
- * Club domestic league appearances and goals as of 1 July 2018

Kees Pier Tol (born 1 January 1987) is a Dutch professional footballer who plays as a forward for Go Ahead Kampen.

== Early and personal life ==
Born in Volendam, Tol is the nephew of former footballer Pier Tol.

== Career ==
Tol made his professional debut in the 2008–09 season with Cambuur. After a season with the amateur RKAV Volendam, Kol returned to the professional game in 2010 with FC Volendam.
