= Korneliya =

Korneliya is a feminine given name, similar to Kornelia.

== List of people with the given name ==
- Korneliya Naydenova (born 1982), Bulgarian footballer
- Korneliya Ninova (born 1969), Bulgarian politician
