= Constance =

Constance may refer to:

== Places ==
- Constance, Kentucky, United States, an unincorporated community
- Constance, Minnesota, United States, an unincorporated community
- Mount Constance, Washington State, United States
- Lake Constance (disambiguation), in several countries
- Konstanz, Germany, sometimes written as Constance in English
- Konstanz (district), Germany

== People ==
- Constance (given name), female given name, also includes list of people with the name
- Andrew Constance (born 1973), Australian politician
- Angela Constance (born 1970), Scottish politician
- Ansley Constance (born 1966), Seychelles politician
- Lincoln Constance (1909–2001), American botanist
- Nathan Constance (born 1979), English actor
- Constance (comedian) (born 1985), French comedian and actress

== Fictitious characters ==
- The protagonist of a story in Nicholas Trivet's Les chronicles retold both as The Man of Law's Tale (by Geoffrey Chaucer) and as the Tale of Constance (in John Gower's Confessio Amantis).

== Arts and entertainment ==
- Constance (album), a 2000 album by Southpacific
- Constance (1984 film), a New Zealand film
- Constance (1998 film), an erotic film
- Constance (novel), 1982 novel by Lawrence Durrell
- Constance Billard School for Girls, a fictional private school in Gossip Girl
- Constance (magazine), arts and literature magazine based in New Orleans
- Constance (video game), a metroidvania video game

== Other uses ==
- HMS Constance, six ships of the British Royal Navy
- USS Constance II (SP-633), later USS YP-633, a United States Navy patrol boat in commission from 1917 to 1922
- Hotel Constance, Pasadena, California, United States
- Constance railway station, a former locomotive depot and stop in New South Wales, Australia

== See also ==
- Constância, Portugal, a municipality
  - Constância (parish), in the municipality
- Constancia (Encrucijada), Cuba, a ward and a town
- Constanța, a city in Romania
- NMS Constanța, a submarine tender of the World War II Romanian Navy
- Constanza (disambiguation), the word Constance in Italian and Spanish
