= Constance (given name) =

Female given name

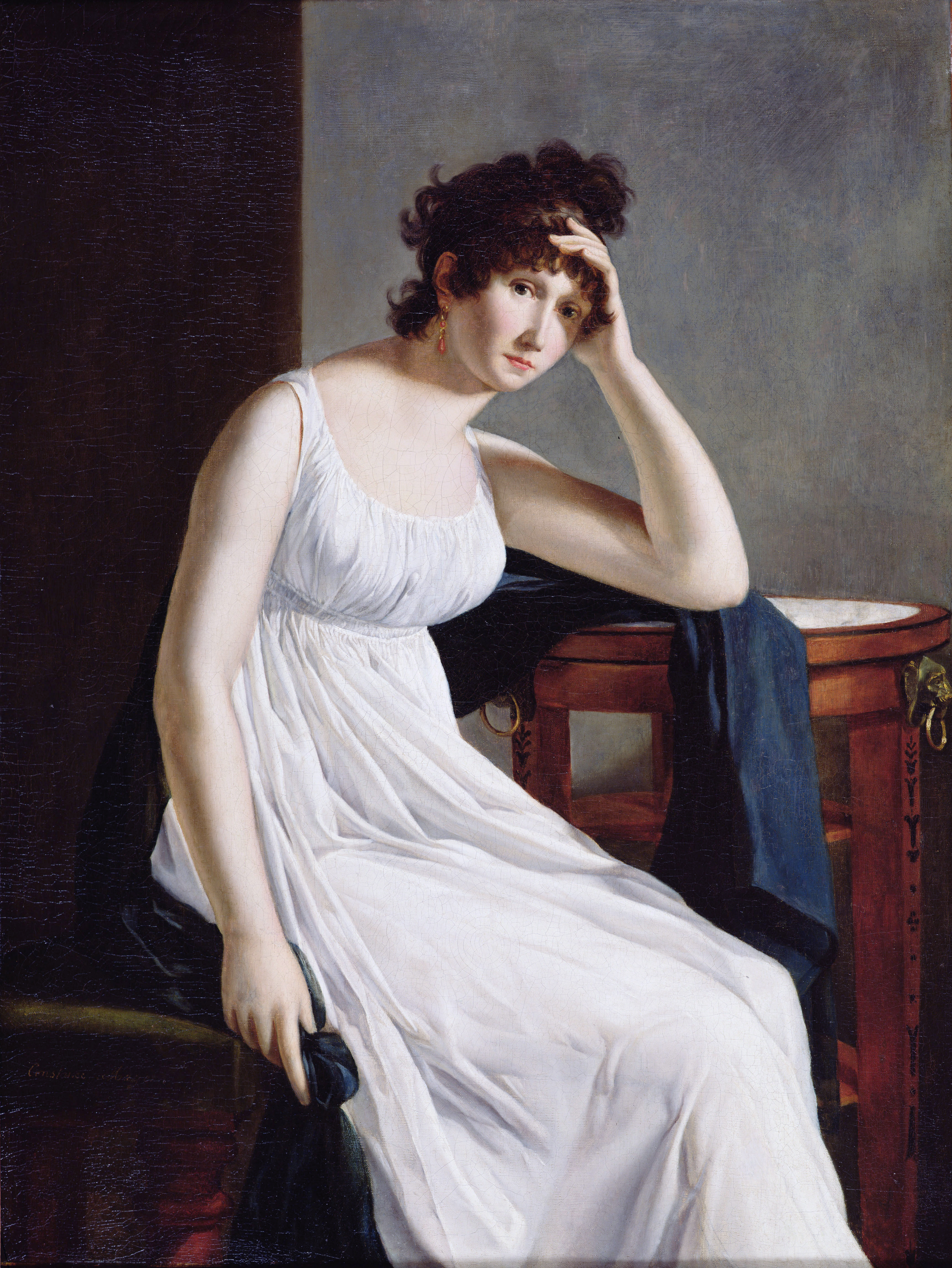
- Constance Mayer, a self portrait, 1801.
- Pronunciation: /ˈkɒnstəns/
- Gender: Female

Origin
- Origin: Latin
- Meaning: Constant

Other names
- Related names: Connie, Constancia, Constanza

Constance is a primarily feminine given name in use since the Middle Ages that is derived either from Constantia, a Late Latin name, or from the term meaning steadfast. In medieval England, diminutives of the name included Cust or Cussot. Puritans used Con, Constant, and Constancy. Other variations of the name include Connie, Constancia, and Constanze.

== Notable people ==
- Constance of Antioch (1127–1163), only daughter of Bohemund II of Antioch
- Constance of Aragon, Holy Roman Empress (1179–1222), Aragonese infanta
- Constance of Arles (986–1034), third wife and queen of King Robert II of France
- Constance of Austria (1588–1631), Queen consort of Poland
- Constance of Burgundy (1046–1093), daughter of Duke Robert I of Burgundy
- Constance of Castile, Duchess of Lancaster (1354–1394) second wife of John of Gaunt
- Constance, Queen of Sicily (1154–1198), also Holy Roman Empress (Dowager)
- Constance of Portugal (1290–1313), daughter of King Denis of Portugal
- Constance de Salm (1767–1845), poet and miscellaneous writer; through her second marriage, she became Princess of Salm-Dyck
- Constance of Wrocław (c. 1221 – 1257), Princess of Silesia and the Duchess of Kuyavia
- Constance of York (1374–1416), daughter of Edmund of Langley, 1st Duke of York
- Constance, Duchess of Brittany (1161–1201), hereditary Duchess of Brittany
- Constance, Duchess of Wodzisław (died 1351), Polish princess
- Constance of Hungary (c. 1180 – 1240), second Queen consort of Ottokar I of Bohemia
- Constance of Toulouse, daughter of Raymond VI of Toulouse
- Constance Babington Smith MBE Legion of Merit FRSL (1912–2000), RAF Photographic Intelligence specialist who discovered the Nazi V-Weapon programme.
- Constance Baker Motley (1921–2005), the first African American woman elected to the New York State Senate and subsequently the first African American female federal judge
- Constance Bennett (1904–1965), American actress
- Constance Bolton (née Beard, 1884–1949), New Zealand artist
- Constance Briscoe (born 1957), British barrister
- Constance Calenda (1415), Italian surgeon
- Constance Marie Charpentier (1767–1849), French painter
- Constance Clayton (1933–2023), American educator and civic leader
- Constance Collier (1878–1955), British-born American actress
- Constance Coltman (1889–1969), British pastor
- Constance Cox (1912–1998), British writer
- Constance Cummings (1910–2005), American-born British actress
- Constance Prem Nath Dass (1886–1971), Indian college administrator
- Constance Demby (1939–2021), American musician
- Constance Dowling (1920–1969), American actress
- Constance Amy Fall (1903–1992), Australian nurse
- Constance of France, Princess of Antioch (1078–1126)
- Constance Ford (1923–1993), American actress
- Constance Garnett (1861–1946), English translator
- Constance Glube (1931–2016), Canadian judge
- Constance Ella Glynn, known as Connie Glynn (born 1994), English YouTuber and author
- Constance Gordon-Cumming (1837–1924), British travel writer and painter
- Constance Grewe (born 1946), German judge
- Constance Le Grip (born 1960), French politician
- Constance Hamilton (1862–1945), Canadian politician
- Constance Cary Harrison (1843–1920), American writer
- Constance Hopkins (1607–1677), English colonist and Mayflower passenger
- Constance A. Howard (born 1942), American politician
- Constance Hunting (1925–2006), American poet
- Constance N. Johnson (born 1952), American politician
- Constance Kamii (born 1931), Swiss-born American educator
- Constance Keene (1921–2005), American pianist
- Constance Stuart Larrabee (1914–2000), South African photographer and war correspondent
- Constance Lau (born 1991), Singaporean actress
- Constance Leathart (1903–1993) British pilot, flew in the Air Transport Auxiliary.
- Constance Lloyd (1858–1898), Oscar Wilde's wife
- Constance Marie (born 1965), American actress
- Constance Markievicz (1868–1927), Irish countess and political activist
- Constance Menard (born 1968), French equestrienne
- Constance J. Milstein (born 1946), American attorney and diplomat
- Constance Moore (1920–2005), American actress
- Constanze Mozart née Weber (1762–1842), Austrian singer, wife and biographer of the composer Wolfgang Amadeus Mozart
- Constance Naden (1858–1889), English poet
- Constance Picaud (born 1998), French footballer
- Constance Piers (1866–1939), Canadian journalist, poet, editor
- Constance Reid (1918–2010), American author
- Constance Rover (1910–2005), English historian
- Constance Senghor (born 1963), Senegalese high jumper
- Constance Lindsay Skinner (1877–1939), Canadian writer
- Constance Smith (disambiguation), several people
- Constance Smith (1929–2003), Irish actress
- Constance Adelaide Smith (1878–1938), Englishwoman responsible for the reinvigoration of Mothering Sunday
- Constance Christine Smith (1942-disappeared 1952), American missing child
- Constance Spry (1886–1960), British florist and author
- Constance Stone (1856–1902), Australian doctor
- Constance Talmadge (1898–1973), American actress
- Constance Tipper (1894–1995), British metallurgist
- Constance Towers (born 1933), American singer and actress
- Constance Fenimore Woolson (1840–1894), American novelist
- Constance Wu (born 1982), American actress
- Constance Zimmer (born 1970), American actress

== Fictional ==
- Constance, Lady Crabtree, character created by Paul James
- Constance Langdon, one of the main characters from FX show American Horror Story
- Constance MacKenzie, character in the 1956 novel Peyton Place by Grace Metalious

== See also ==
- Constance (disambiguation)
- Constant (given name)
- Constant (surname)
