= Connie =

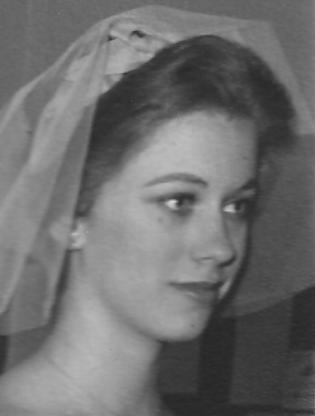
Connie Booth, American actress and writer

Connie (/ˈkɒni/) is a given name. It is often a pet form (hypocorism) of Concetta, Constance, Cornelia, Cornelius, Conor, Conrad, Constanza, Concepcion/Conception, Consuela, Consuelo, or Conner. Many Asian-American women were named after journalist Connie Chung in the 1980s even though the name was not otherwise popular at the time.

== Given name or nickname ==
=== Women ===
- Connie Achurra (born 1977), Chilean chef
- Connie Adam (1927–2021), English fencer
- Connie Binsfeld (1924–2014), American politician
- Connie Booth (born 1944), American actress and writer, former wife of John Cleese
- Connie Boucher (1923-1995), American businesswoman
- Connie Britton (born 1967), American actress, singer and producer
- Connie Brockway (born 1954), American historical and romance novelist
- Connie Bush (1919–1997), Australian aboriginal health worker
- Connie Carpenter-Phinney (born 1957), American retired cyclist and speed skater
- Connie Chung (born 1946), American journalist
- Constance Clayton (1933–2023), American educator and civic leader
- Connie Cody, Canadian politician
- Connie Constance (born 1995), British singer and songwriter
- Connie Conway (born 1950), American politician
- Connie Desmond (1908–1983), American baseball sportscaster
- Connie Dierking (1936–2013), American Basketball League and National Basketball Association player
- Connie Eaves (1944–2024), Canadian biologist
- Connie Ediss (1870–1934), English actress and singer
- Connie Egan (born 1994), Northern Irish politician
- Connie Ferguson (born 1970), South African-Motswana actress, filmmaker, producer and businesswoman
- Connie Fife (1961–2017), Canadian Cree poet and editor
- Connie Fisher (born 1983), Northern Irish-born Welsh actress and singer
- Connie Fleming, American supermodel
- Connie Francis (1937–2025), American singer, actress, and vocalist
- Connie Gilchrist (1901–1985), American actress
- Connie Guion (1882–1971), American professor of medicine
- Connie Gilchrist, Countess of Orkney (1865–1946), British child artist's model, actress, dancer, and singer
- Connie Hines (1931–2009), American actress
- Connie Hansen (born 1964), Danish Paralympian
- Connie Hedegaard (born 1960), Danish politician
- Connie Johnson (fundraiser) (1977–2017), Australian philanthropist
- Connie L. Johnson, American politician
- Connie Laliberte (born 1960), Canadian curler, 1984 world champion
- Connie Lawson (born 1949), American politician, Indiana Secretary of State
- Connie Lewcock (1894–1980), British suffragette, arsonist and socialist
- Connie Meijer (1963–1988), Dutch cyclist
- Connie Mitchell (born c. 1977), South African-born Australian singer-songwriter also known as Miss Connie
- Connie Morrison, American politician and businesswoman
- Connie Newman, American endocrinologist and physician-scientist
- Connie Nielsen (born 1965), Danish actress
- Connie Norman (1949–1996), American AIDS, gay, and transgender rights activist
- Connie O'Brien (born 1946), American politician
- Connie Palmen (born 1955), Dutch author
- Connie Panzarino (1947–2001) American writer and activist for disability and LGBTQ rights
- Connie Porter (born 1959), American author
- Connie Price-Smith (born 1962), American former shot putter and discus thrower
- Connie Ramsay (born 1988), Scottish judoka
- Connie Russell (1923–1990), American singer and actress
- Connie Ruth (born 1944), American politician
- Connie Schultz (born 1957), American writer, Pulitzer Prize-winning journalist and columnist
- Connie Sison (born 1975), Filipina journalist
- Connie Smith (born 1941), American country music singer and songwriter born Constance June Meador
- Connie Smith (born 1942), a missing American girl who disappeared from her Connecticut summer camp in 1952
- Connie Steinmetz, American politician
- Connie Talbot (born 2000), English child singer, finalist in the first series of Britain's Got Talent
- Connie Van Houten, American politician
- Connie Willis (born 1945), American science fiction and fantasy writer
- Connie Yori (born 1963), American basketball coach

=== Men ===
- Connie Brown (1917–1966), Canadian National Hockey League player
- Connie Dion (1918–2014), Canadian National Hockey League player
- Connie B. Gay (1914–1989), American country music talent scout/manager, owner of radio and television stations and music executive
- Connie Grob (1932–1997), American baseball player
- Connie Hawkins (1942–2017), American basketball player
- Connie Jones (1934–2019), American jazz trumpeter and cornetist from New Orleans
- Connie Johnson (baseball) (1922–2004), American pitcher in the Negro leagues and Major League Baseball
- Connie Keane (1930–2010), Irish hurler in the 1950s
- Connie Kelly (1949–1985), Irish retired hurler
- L. William O'Connell (1890–1985), American cinematographer
- Connie Mack (1862–1956), American Major League Baseball player, manager and team owner
- Connie Mack III (born 1940), American politician and attorney, grandson of Connie Mack
- Connie Mack IV (born 1967), American politician, son of the above
- Connie Murphy (baseball) (1870–1945), American Major League Baseball catcher
- Connie Sheehan (1889–1950), Irish hurler in the 1910s and '20s
- Connie Simmons (1925–1989), American National Basketball Association player
- Connie Zelencik (1955–2021), American football player

== Stage or pen name ==
- Connie Deka and Connie Lane, pen names of Constance Laux (born 1952), American romance novelist
- Connie Francis (1937–2025), American singer Concetta Rosa Maria Franconero
- Connie Glynn (born 1994), English YouTuber and author Constance Ella Glynn
- Connie Kay (1927–1994), American jazz drummer born Conrad Henry Kirnon
- Connie Sellecca (born Concetta Sellecchia in 1955), American actress, producer and former model
- Connie Stevens (born 1938), American actress and singer Concetta Rosalie Ann Ingoglia
- Connie (freestyle singer), American singer Consuelo Piriz
- Connie (Burmese singer) (born 1967), Burmese singer born Yadana Tun

== Fictional characters ==
- Connie Blair, heroine of 12 mystery novels for adolescent girls written by Betty Cavanna
- Connie Clayton, from the soap opera Coronation Street
- Connie Corleone, played by Talia Shire in The Godfather movie trilogy
- Connie Kurridge, the titular character of Connie, a newspaper comic strip created by Frank Godwin
- Connie Rubirosa, a character of Law & Order, an Assistant District Attorney, portrayed by Alana De La Garza
- Connie Sachs, from the Karla Trilogy spy novels by John le Carré
- Connie (The Walking Dead), a fictional character from The Walking Dead
- Connie Springer, a fictional character from Attack on Titan

== Animals ==
- Konni (dog) (1999–2014), Vladimir Putin's dog, also known as Connie

== See also ==
- Konnie Huq (born 1975), British television presenter
- Conny, a given name or surname (including a list of persons with the name)
- Kalitta Air, callsign "Connie"
