= Barros =

Barros is a Portuguese and Galician surname. It may refer to:

== People ==
- Alejandra Barros (born 1971), Mexican actress
- Alessandra Barros (born 1979), Brazilian curler
- Alex Barros (born 1970), Brazilian motorcycle road racer
- Ana Beatriz Barros (born 1982), Brazilian model
- Ana P. Barros, American civil and environmental engineer
- Antônio Carlos de Mariz e Barros (1835–1866), Brazilian navy officer
- César Barros (fencer) (1912–1992), Chilean fencer
- Augusto Barros (1929–1998), Portuguese painter, also known as Barros, and Augusto Barros Ferreira
- Clara Barros (born 1998), Brazilian para-athlete
- Dana Barros (born 1967), United States basketball player
- Diego Barros Arana (1830–1907), Chilean educator, diplomat, and historian
- Ernesto Barros Jarpa (1894–1977), Chilean academic and politician
- Fabrício Barros (born 1998), Brazilian para-athlete
- Flavio Barros, Brazilian footballer
- Giovanna Barros (born 2001), Brazilian curler
- Guillermo Barros Schelotto (born 1973), Argentine footballer
- Gustavo Barros Schelotto (born 1973), Argentine footballer and twin brother of Guillermo
- Iván Fandiño Barros (1980–2017), Spanish bullfighter
- José Barros (1915–2007), Colombian musician
- José de Barros Lima (1764–1817), Brazilian military
- Juan José Barros (born 1989), Colombian-born Peruvian footballer
- Leila Barros (born 1971), Brazilian volleyball player
- Luis Barros Borgoño (1858–1943), Chilean politician
- Luiz Cláudio Barros (born 1978), Brazilian footballer
- Marisa Barros (born 1980), Portuguese long-distance runner
- Pía Barros (born 1956), Chilean writer
- Ramón Barros Luco (1835–1919), President of Chile between 1910 and 1915
- Raquel Barros (1919–2014), Chilean folklorist
- Rui Barros (born 1965), Portuguese footballer
- Zoila Barros (born 1976), Cuban volleyball player
- Lisa Barros D'Sa, British actress and director

== Places ==
- Barros, Asturias, parish within the town of Langreo, in the Spanish province of Asturias
- Orocovis, Puerto Rico, former name of Orocovis municipality in Puerto Rico
- Barros, Orocovis, Puerto Rico, a barrio

== Other uses ==
- Barros Luco, sandwich named after Ramón Barros Luco.
- Barros Jarpa, sandwich named after Ernesto Barros Jarpa.

== See also ==
- For people with the surname de Barros see de Barros
