= Honey Bunch =

Fictional book series for children

The Honey Bunch series of books were part of the Stratemeyer Syndicate's production of 20th century children's books featuring adventurous youngsters, which included the series Nancy Drew, the Hardy Boys and the Bobbsey Twins. This series was written under the pseudonym Helen Louise Thorndyke, and published for most of its duration by Grosset & Dunlap. The series began in 1923 and chronicled a young girl named Honey Bunch on her various trips and adventures. Along with Laura Lee Hope's series Bunny Brown and His Sister Sue, it was one of their most famous series for younger children.

== Chronology of the series ==
The first sixteen volumes were written by Josephine Lawrence:

1. Honey Bunch: Just a Little Girl, 1923
2. Honey Bunch: Her First Visit to the City, 1923
3. Honey Bunch: Her First Days on the Farm, 1923
4. Honey Bunch: Her First Visit to the Seashore, 1924
5. Honey Bunch: Her First Little Garden, 1924
6. Honey Bunch: Her First Days in Camp, 1925
7. Honey Bunch: Her First Auto Tour, 1926
8. Honey Bunch: Her First Trip on the Ocean, 1927
9. Honey Bunch: Her First Trip West, 1927
10. Honey Bunch: Her First Summer on an Island, 1928
11. Honey Bunch: Her First Trip on the Great Lakes, 1930
12. Honey Bunch: Her First Trip in an Airplane, 1931
13. Honey Bunch: Her First Visit to the Zoo, 1932
14. Honey Bunch: Her First Big Adventure, 1933
15. Honey Bunch: Her First Big Parade, 1934
16. Honey Bunch: Her First Little Mystery, 1935
17. Honey Bunch: Her First Little Circus, 1936

Series books were at times perceived as being poor quality children's literature. Honey Bunch volumes 1 and 2 were among a set of books that school librarians eliminated from reading lists in the 1920s, after determining that they had low literary value.

Mildred Wirt Benson, who is best known for writing many of the first Nancy Drew books, wrote five books in this series:

18. Honey Bunch: Her First Little Treasure Hunt, 1937
19. Honey Bunch: Her First Little Club, 1938
20. Honey Bunch: Her First Trip in a Trailer, 1939
21. Honey Bunch: Her First Trip to a Big Fair, 1940
22. Honey Bunch: Her First Twin Playmates, 1941

And the series continues into a third and fourth decade:

23. Honey Bunch: Her First Costume Party, 1942
24. Honey Bunch: Her First Trip on a House Boat, 1943
25. Honey Bunch: Her First Winter at Snowtop, 1944
26. Honey Bunch: Her First Trip to the Big Woods, 1947
27. Honey Bunch: Her First Little Pet Show, 1948
28. Honey Bunch: Her First Trip to a Lighthouse, 1949
29. Honey Bunch: Her First Visit to a Pony Ranch, 1950
30. Honey Bunch: Her First Tour of Toy Town, 1951
31. Honey Bunch: Her First Visit to Puppyland, 1952
32. Honey Bunch: Her First Trip to Reindeer Farm, 1953

The original series consisted of 34 books (the 34th published in 1955), although for the final two books, the title format was changed from just "Honey Bunch" to "Honey Bunch and Norman", signaling the shift the series would take to attempt to appeal to both sexes.

A 35th book was listed in the back of #34 as Honey Bunch and Norman Visit Cocoa Land. This book was never released. However, the manuscript of it is in the New York Public Library archives.

In 1957 the series was re-vamped with altered titles. As would also be done later by the Syndicate with the Dana Girls series, recent titles in the original series were recycled throughout the beginning of the new series. For example, Honey Bunch and Norman on Lighthouse Island, was first published in 1949 as Honey Bunch: Her First Trip to a Lighthouse, and Honey Bunch and Norman Visit Reindeer Farm 1958 was first published in 1953 as Honey Bunch: Her First Trip to Reindeer Farm. These books were written by Andrew E. Svenson and unlike the previous series that had 1 to 3 illustrations, were illustrated throughout.

1. Honey Bunch and Norman
2. Honey Bunch and Norman on Lighthouse Island
3. Honey Bunch and Norman Tour Toy Town
4. Honey Bunch and Norman Play Detective at Niagara Falls

The revamped series continued:

5. Honey Bunch and Norman Ride with the Sky Mailman
6. Honey Bunch and Norman Visit Beaver Lodge
7. Honey Bunch and Norman Visit Reindeer Farm
8. Honey Bunch and Norman in the Castle of Magic
9. Honey Bunch and Norman Solve the Pine Cone Mystery
10. Honey Bunch and Norman and the Paper Lantern Mystery
11. Honey Bunch and Norman and the Painted Pony

The final book of the Honey Bunch and Norman series was published in 1963,

12. Honey Bunch and Norman and the Walnut Tree Mystery

This may be the last Stratemeyer Syndicate book to be published with a dust jacket, as most of the other Syndicate series seemed to phase them out by 1962. There is a manuscript for an unpublished 13th book, The Wooden Shoe Mystery, at the New York Public Library.

== Cover designs ==
Although the final book was published in 1963, the books remained in print for several years, though in the picture cover format, as Grosset & Dunlap had completely switched their line of series over from wrap around dust covers to picture covers. It is believed that all 12 books were published in picture cover format. In the 1960s, Grosset & Dunlap had decided, for example with the Judy Bolton series and Connie Blair, not to republish select titles in picture cover format. It is possible this was done with the Honey Bunch and Norman series. Picture cover versions tend to be more difficult to find for this series since more copies were printed with dust jackets.

The first 12 books originally had individual cover art for each book by Walter S. Rogers, who was active with several Syndicate Series of the 1910s-1930s (The Bobbsey Twins and Hardy Boys for example). Marie Schubert took over with book 13, providing a more modern fashion than Rogers had used. The Syndicate was moving toward more progressive artwork during this period throughout its popular series. Schubert continued until book 23. Book 24 also saw the end of individual cover-artwork, until the series was re-vamped in 1957. From book 25 on, Harry Lane is credited with the cover illustration. The previous books were also re-issued with the new, uniform artwork. Harry Lane's artwork was retired with book 32 of the original series. The correct 31st book, Honey Bunch: Her First Visit to Puppyland, was published in 1952. This book is extremely hard to find. There are 32 Honey Bunch books and 12 Honey Bunch and Norman books. When the series was re-vamped in 1957, individual cover illustrations were returned.
