= Cownie =

Cownie is a surname. Notable people with the surname include:

- Frank Cownie (born 1948), American politician and businessman
- Peter Cownie (born 1980), American politician
- Ryan Cownie (born 1987/88), American stand-up comedian

== See also ==
- Connie
