= Don Sturdy =

Juvenile book series

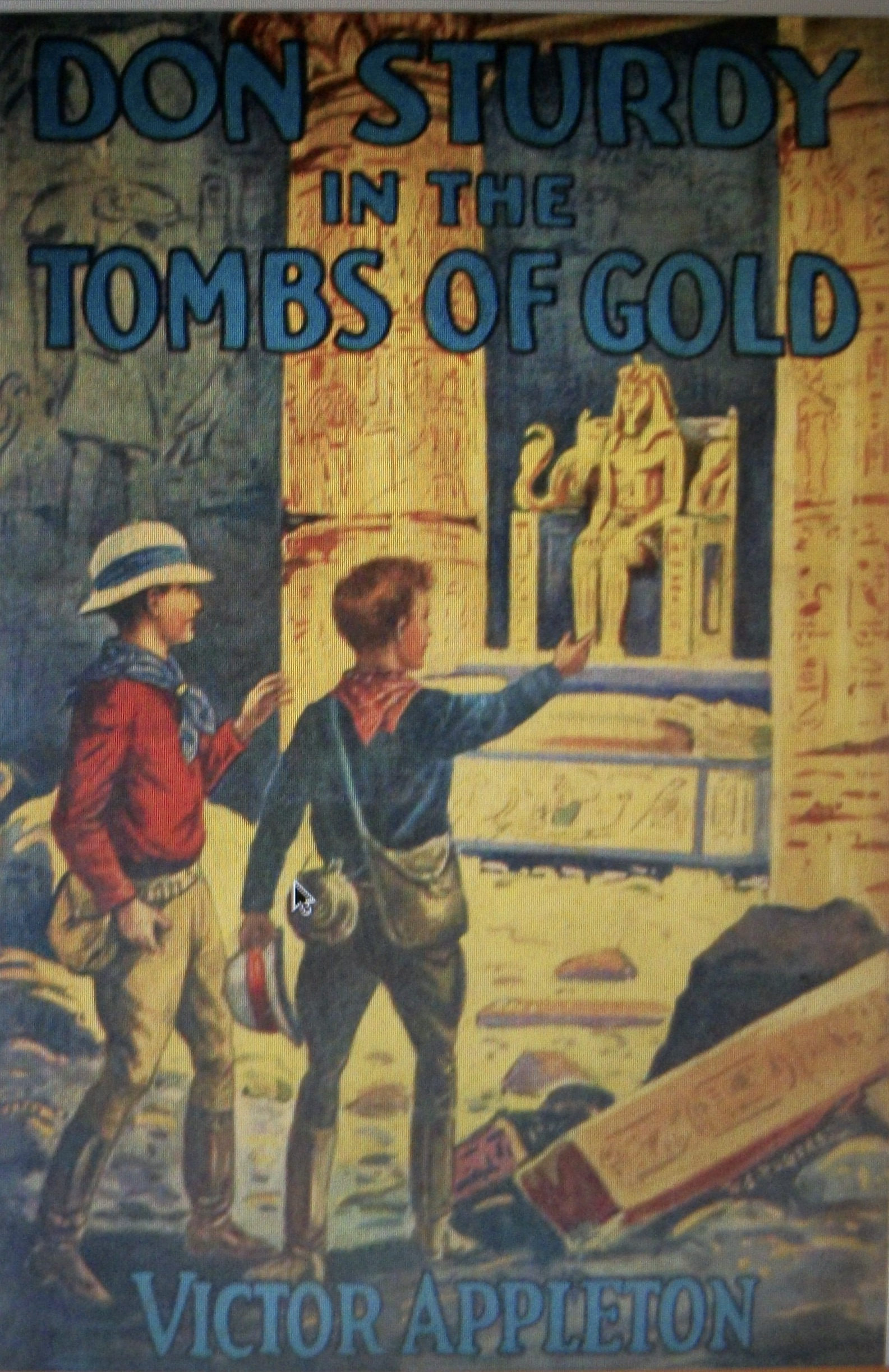
- Don Sturdy In the Tombs of Gold novel cover
- Author: Victor Appleton (pseudonym)
- Language: English
- Genre: Juvenile adventure
- Publisher: Grosset & Dunlap
- Publication date: 1925–1935
- Publication place: United States

Don Sturdy is a fictional character in the Don Sturdy series of 15 American children's adventure novels published between 1925 and 1935 by Grosset & Dunlap. The books were credited to Victor Appleton, a house name used by the Stratemeyer Syndicate, but the actual writer for all but one of the books was John W. Duffield (the remaining book, Don Sturdy In The Land Of Giants, or, Captives Of the Savage Patagonians (1930), was written by Howard Roger Garis). The books were illustrated by Walter S. Rogers.

In the books, boy adventurer Don Sturdy and (usually) his sidekick Teddy "Brick" Allison accompany Sturdy's two uncles (one a noted scientist, the other a big game hunter) on various adventures to exotic lands where various obstacles and dangers are overcome, archeological sites are discovered, villains are foiled, wild animals are hunted, lives are saved, storms are endured, and similar difficulties mastered, with all eventually returning safe and sound to America.

Grosset & Dunlap bound the book series in cloth-over-board covers, and the series continued to be sold in the United States until at least 1940.

This series appears to be the second Stratemeyer Syndicate series' to be reprinted outside the United States, where it was originally published; the first series book being the first book in the Ted Scott series. An exact date of first printing is unknown, as the earlier copy of Big Snake Hunters doesn't have a printing or copyright date inside. Only two Don Sturdy titles were printed in Britain (the other being The Desert of Mystery). Two British forms of The Big Snake Hunters are known to exist, both printed by The Children's Press. One is from the 1930s and another with different cover art from 1953.

The 15 books in the Don Sturdy series were originally published in the following order:

- 01 - Don Sturdy On The Desert Of Mystery, or Autoing In The Land Of Caravans, illustrated by Walter S. Rogers, 1925, Grosset & Dunlap, New York
- 02 - Don Sturdy With The Big Snake Hunters, or Lost in the Jungle of the Amazon, illustrated by Walter S. Rogers, 1925, Grosset & Dunlap, New York
- 03 - Don Sturdy In The Tombs Of Gold, or The Old Egyptian's Great Secret, illustrated by Walter S. Rogers, 1925, Grosset & Dunlap, New York
- 04 - Don Sturdy Across The North Pole, or Cast Away in the Land of Ice, illustrated by Walter S. Rogers, 1925, Grosset & Dunlap, New York
- 05 - Don Sturdy In The Land Of Volcanoes, or The Trail of the Ten Thousand Smokes, illustrated by Walter S. Rogers, 1925, Grosset & Dunlap, New York
- 06 - Don Sturdy In The Port Of Lost Ships, or Adrift in the Sargasso Sea, illustrated by Walter S. Rogers, 1926, Grosset & Dunlap, New York
- 07 - Don Sturdy Among The Gorillas, or Adrift in the Great Jungle, illustrated by Walter S. Rogers, 1927, Grosset & Dunlap, New York
- 08 - Don Sturdy Captured By Head Hunters, or Adrift in the Wilds of Borneo, illustrated by Walter S. Rogers, 1928, Grosset & Dunlap, New York
- 09 - Don Sturdy In Lion Land, or The Strange Clearing in the Jungle, illustrated by Walter S. Rogers, 1929, Grosset & Dunlap, New York
- 10 - Don Sturdy In The Land Of Giants, or Captives of the Savage Patagonians, illustrated by Walter S. Rogers, 1930, Grosset & Dunlap, New York
- 11 - Don Sturdy On The Ocean Bottom, or The Strange Cruise of the Phantom, illustrated by Walter S. Rogers, 1931, Grosset & Dunlap, New York
- 12 - Don Sturdy In The Temples Of Fear, or Destined for a Strange Sacrifice, illustrated by Nat Falk, 1932, Grosset & Dunlap, New York
- 13 - Don Sturdy Lost In Glacier Bay, or The Mystery of the Moving Totem Poles, illustrated by Nat Falk, 1933, Grosset & Dunlap, New York
- 14 - Don Sturdy Trapped In The Flaming Wilderness, or Unearthing Secrets in Central Asia, illustrated by Nat Falk, 1934, Grosset & Dunlap, New York
- 15 - Don Sturdy With The Harpoon Hunters, or The Strange Cruise of the Whaling Ship, illustrated by Nat Falk, 1935, Grosset & Dunlap, New York
