= Constant (given name) =

- Gender: male

Origin
- Origin: Latin word constans
- Meaning: constant, steadfast

Other names
- Related names: Constance, Constantine

Constant is a given name, and may refer to:

- André Henri Constant van Hasselt (1806–1874), Flemish poet
- André Marie Constant Duméril (1774–1860), French zoologist
- Constant Chevillon (1880–1944), Grand Master of the Freemasonry Rite of Memphis-Misraïm
- Constant d'Aubigné (c. 1584 – 1647), French nobleman
- Constant de Kerchove de Denterghem (1790–1865), Belgian liberal politician
- Constant Feith (1884–1958), Dutch amateur football player
- Constant Fornerod (1819–1899), Swiss politician
- Constant Fouard (1837–1903), French ecclesiastical writer
- Constant Huret (1870–1951), long distance track racing cyclist
- Constant Janssen (1895–1970), Belgian physician and businessman
- Constant Lambert (1905–1951), British composer and conductor
- Constant Le Marchand de Lignery (1662–1732), French military officer
- Constant Lestienne (born 1992), French tennis player
- Constant Martin (1910–1995), French engineer and inventor of the clavioline
- Constant Nieuwenhuys (1920–2005), Dutch painter, generally known simply as Constant
- Constant Permeke (1886–1952), Belgian painter
- Constant Prévost (1787–1856), French geologist
- Constant Tonegaru (1919–1952), Romanian poet
- Constant Troyon (1810–1865), French painter
- Constant Vanden Stock (1914–2008), honorary president and former president and player of Belgian football club R.S.C. Anderlecht
- Jean Michel Constant Leber (1780–1859), French historian and bibliophile
- Jean René Constant Quoy (1790–1869), French zoologist
- Louis Constant Wairy (1778–1845) Premier valet de chambre of Napoleon Bonaparte (not to be confused with Benjamin Constant)
- Marie Philibert Constant Sappey (1810–1896), French anatomist

== See also ==
- Constance (name)
- Constant (surname)
- Constantine (name)
- Constant-Désiré
- Benjamin-Constant
- Benoît-Constant
- Saint-Constant (disambiguation)
