= Constanze =

Constanze is a feminine given name related to Constance. It is borne by:

- Constanze Backes, German opera and concert soprano
- Constanze Blum (born 1972), German cross-country skier
- Constanze Engelbrecht (1950–2000), German actress
- Constanze Feine (born 1999), German canoeist
- Constanze Geiger (1835–1890), Austrian pianist, actor, theatrical actress, composer and singer
- Constanze Gensel (born 1969 or 1970), figure skater who competed for East Germany
- Constanze Jahn (born 1963), German chess Woman International Master
- Constanze Krehl (born 1956), German politician
- Constanze Mozart (1762–1842), Austrian singer, wife of Wolfgang Amadeus Mozart
- Constanze Moser-Scandolo (born 1965), speed skater who competed for East Germany
- Constanze Paulinus (born 1985), German former figure skater
- Constanze Siering (born 1991), German rower
- Constanze Stelzenmüller, German international relations analyst, policy and law scholar, and journalist
