= Constant =

Constant or The Constant may refer to:

== Mathematics ==
- Constant (mathematics), a non-varying value
- Mathematical constant, a special number that arises naturally in mathematics, such as π or e

== Other concepts ==
- Control variable or scientific constant, in experimentation the unchanging or constant variable
- Physical constant, a physical quantity generally believed to be universal and unchanging
- Constant (computer programming), a value that, unlike a variable, cannot be reassociated with a different value
- Logical constant, a symbol in symbolic logic that has the same meaning in all models, such as the symbol "=" for "equals"

== People ==
- Constant (given name)
- Constant (surname)
- John, Elector of Saxony (1468–1532), known as John the Constant
- Constant Nieuwenhuys (1920-2005), better known as Constant

== Places ==
- Constant, Barbados, a populated place

== Arts and entertainment ==
- "The Constant", a 2008 episode of the television show Lost
- The Constant (Story of the Year album)
- The Constant (I Blame Coco album)
- Constants (band), an American rock band
- "Constant pt.1 pt.2", a song by Black Eyed Peas from Masters of the Sun Vol. 1, 2018
- "The Constant", a song by Anthrax from Worship Music, 2011
