= Constant (surname) =

Constant is a surname. Notable people with the surname include:

- Benjamin Constant (1767–1830), Swiss-born thinker, writer and French politician
- Benjamin Constant (Brazil) (1836–1891), Brazilian military man and political thinker
- David Constant (born 1941), English cricket umpire
- Edward Constant II (born c. 1942), American historian
- Emmanuel Constant (bishop) (1928–2009), Roman Catholic Haitian bishop
- Emmanuel Constant (born 1956), Haitian criminal
- Eugen Constant (1890–1975), Romanian writer and trade unionist
- Eugène Constant (1901–1970), French rower
- F. Woodbridge Constant (1904–1988), American physicist
- Jean-Joseph Benjamin-Constant, (1845–1902), French painter
- Kevin Constant (born 1987), Guinean footballer
- Marius Constant (1925–2004), Romanian-born French composer
- Paul-Henri-Benjamin d'Estournelles de Constant (1852–1924), French diplomat and politician
- Pete Constant (born 1963), American politician

== See also ==
- Constance (name)
- Constant (given name)
- Constant-Désiré
- Benjamin-Constant
- Benoît-Constant
- Saint-Constant (disambiguation)
