= Grace May North =

American journalist (1876–1960)

- Born: February 1, 1876; Utica, New York, U.S.
- Died: July 23, 1960 (aged 84); San Luis Obispo, California, U.S.
- Occupations: Journalist; author

Grace May North (Monfort) (February 1, 1876 – July 23, 1960) was an American newspaper journalist and author of novels for children and adolescents, stories which featured both girl and boy protagonists. She wrote primarily under her birth/'maiden' name Grace May North although some of her later novels were also republished under the pen-name Carol Norton.

== Biography ==
Grace May North was born in Utica, New York on February 1, 1876. During her career, she is known to have worked as a newspaper journalist. She resided in New York City, where she worked at the Webster Branch of the New York Public Library from 1910 to 1915. Her duties included running a story telling club for girls, and doing story telling in schools and institutions. She moved west to Nevada, residing in Carson City. Subsequently she moved to Santa Barbara, California. Grace died in San Luis Obispo, California on July 23, 1960.

== Career ==
North wrote most of her novels from ca. 1918 to ca. 1935. She produced two series of novels for adolescent girls (roughly 1919-1924), and went on to write a number of individual novels, also for girls. Many of the later were also subsequently republished under the pen-name Carol Norton. In addition to her female-themed young-adult works she was also the author of, among others, three books in the X Bar X Boys series for adolescent boys and the Southwestern Stories for Children series for younger children (unpublished).

== Works ==
=== Adele Doring series ===
- Adele Doring of the Sunnyside Club (1919; Adele Doring, #1)
- Adele Doring on a Ranch (1920; Adele Doring, #2)
- Adele Doring at Boarding-School (1921; Adele Doring, #3)
- Adele Doring in Camp (1922; Adele Doring, #4)
- Adele Doring at Vineyard Valley (1923; Adele Doring, #5)

=== Virginia Davis series ===
- Virginia at Vine Haven (1924)
- Virginia's Adventure Club (1924)
- Virginia of V.M. Ranch (1924)
- Virginia's Ranch Neighbors (1924)
- Virginia's Romance (1924)

=== Individual books ===
- The Bylow Squirrel Boys (1915;Bedtime Rhymes)
- Meg of Mystery Mountain (1926)
- Nan of the Gypsies (1926)
- Rilla of the Lighthouse (1926)
- Bobs, a girl detective (1928)
- Sisters (1928);
- The Seven Sleuths’ Club (1928)
- The Phantom Yacht (1928)
- The Phantom Town Mystery (reprinted? 1933)
- Dixie Martin, The Girl of Woodford's Cañon (1924)

=== X Bar X Boys series ===
- The X Bar X Boys at the Strange Rodeo (1935; X Bar X Boys #14)
- The X Bar X Boys Hunting the Prize Mustangs (1937; X Bar X Boys #16)
- The X Bar X Boys at Triangle Mine (1938; X Bar X Boys #17)

== Family ==
Grace was the daughter of Eugene Northrup and Adele N. Harrington.

She married widower William Nelson Monfort in Santa Barbara on August 3, 1923.

One of her step-sons, Donald L. Monfort, was killed in World War II.

Her other step-son, Gordon W. Monfort, died in Fresno in 1985.
