= Walter S. Rogers =

American illustrator (1870–1937)

Walter Stanton Rogers (May 12, 1870 – 1937) was one of the primary illustrators used by the Stratemeyer Syndicate for its children's book series from the 1910s-1930s. For many collectors, Rogers, "with his many wonderful full-color dust jackets," was "a benchmark for a successful series-book illustrator."

Rogers contributed illustrations in part or full for The Bobbsey Twins, Hardy Boys (Vol. 1-10), Tom Swift, Bunny Brown and His Sister Sue, Six Little Bunkers, Ted Scott Flying Stories, Motion Picture Chums, Motion Picture Boys, Motion Picture Girls, Outdoor Girls, X Bar X Boys, The Rover Boys and others. Taking over from artist Henry Richard Boehm after his death, Rogers illustrated about 300 volumes for the Stratemeyer Syndicate, as well as magazines, and a few books for other authors and publishers. Rogers was replaced at Stratemeyer in the 1930s by several other illustrators (Marie Schubert and J. Clemens Gretta, for example) whose work was more modern and "edgy".

== Biography ==
Walter S. Rogers was born in Burlington Iowa on May 12, 1870, the third child of Edward Payson Rogers and Clara Elisabeth Harvey Rogers. Earlier in his career, he provided illustrations for the St. Louis Republic newspaper, then in 1896 worked on an illustrated weekly paper published in Peoria, Illinois.

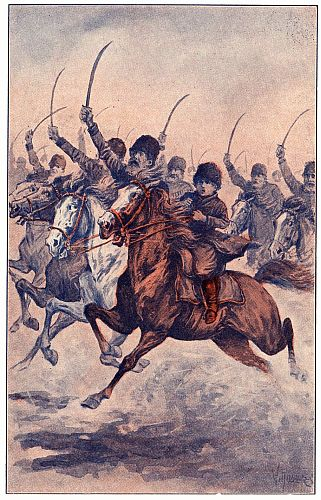
Our Little Cossack Cousin by F. A. Postnikov, illustrated by Walter S. Rogers in 1916
