= Connie Achurra =

Chilean television chef and healthy eating activist

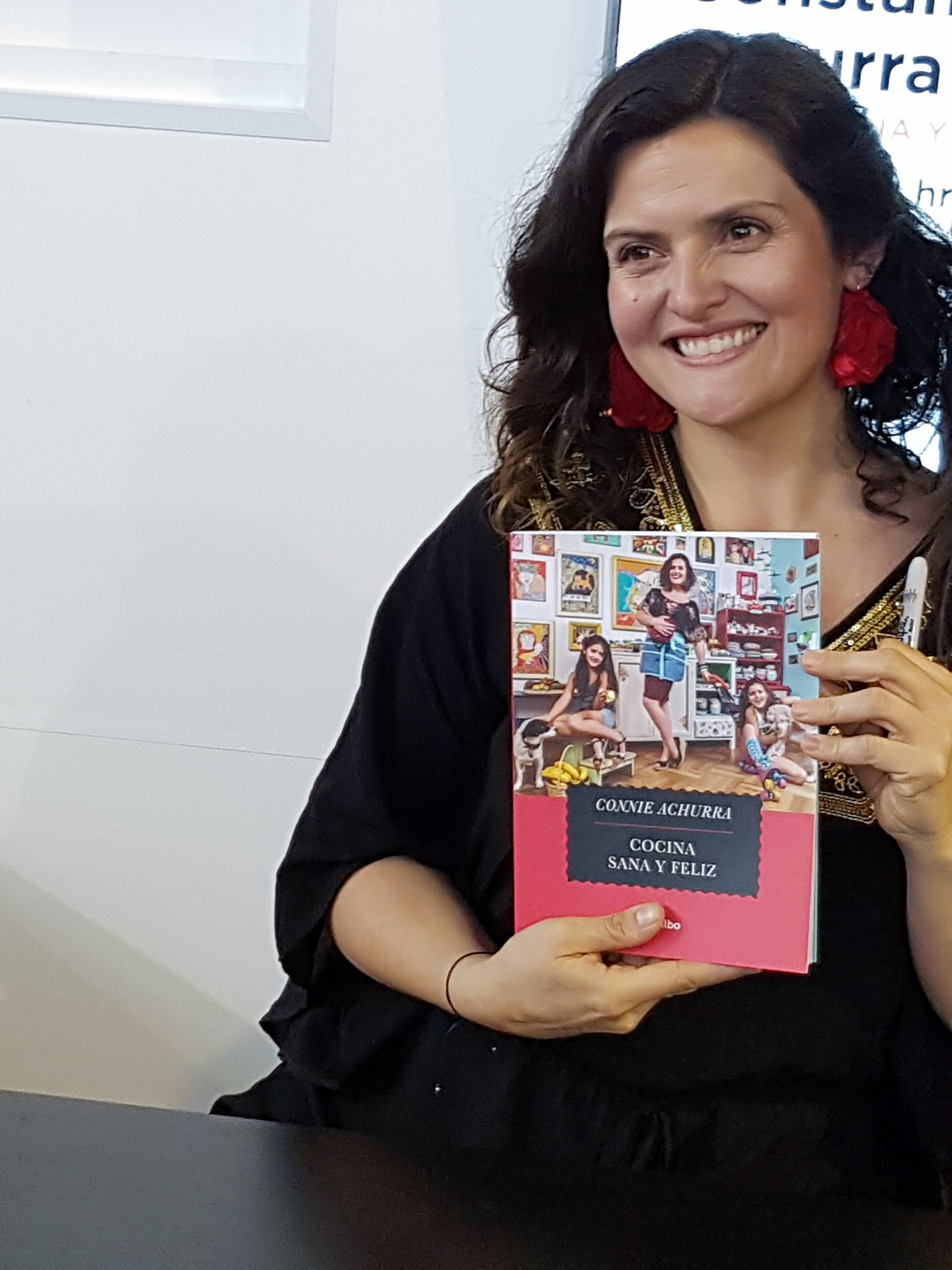
- Achurra at the Santiago International Book Fair 2017
- Born: Constanza Gabriela Achurra Díaz; September 15, 1977 (age 47); Santiago, Chile
- Spouse: Claudio Carrizo
- Culinary career
- Television show(s): Mi Lado Dulce
- Website: connieachurra.cl

Connie Achurra is a Chilean television chef and healthy eating activist. The daughter of Patricio Achurra, she suffered from bulimia in her youth. She since turned her diet without refined sugars into social media presence showing healthy recipes, and ran workshops to teach people before presenting her series Mi Lado Dulce on Canal 13.

== Career ==
Connie Achurra was born in Chile, the daughter of actor Patricio Achurra, the sister of actor Ignacio Achurra, and Macarena Achurra, the professional photographer. She attended Universidad Mayor, but did not finish with a degree. From the ages of 13 to 22, Connie suffered from bulimia until she was caught by her brother, and her mother eventually found out. Her family sent her to several different specialists to help her. After meeting with doctors and psychologists, she was diagnosed with a sugar addiction and sought to cut out refined sugars from her diet.

She eventually began working at Televisión Nacional de Chile, where she met her future husband. After they were both laid off, Achurra set up a furniture restoration workshop called Persian Biobío with financial support from her mother. She promoted her work on Facebook and began to attract clients. Achurra also began to post about healthy eating, in particular how to create desserts without using refined sugars. This grew in popularity on Facebook, and she organised workshops for others to attend and learn recipes. She then began to present Mi Lado Dulce on the television station Canal 13. In 2017, her first cookbook was published, entitled Cocina sana y feliz (Eng: Healthy and Happy Kitchen).

== Personal life ==
Achurra has two daughters with husband Claudio Carrizo, a music producer. She has stressed the importance of children to learn healthy eating habits through the examples of adults around them.
