= Lea Sophie Barth =

German canoeist (born 1998)

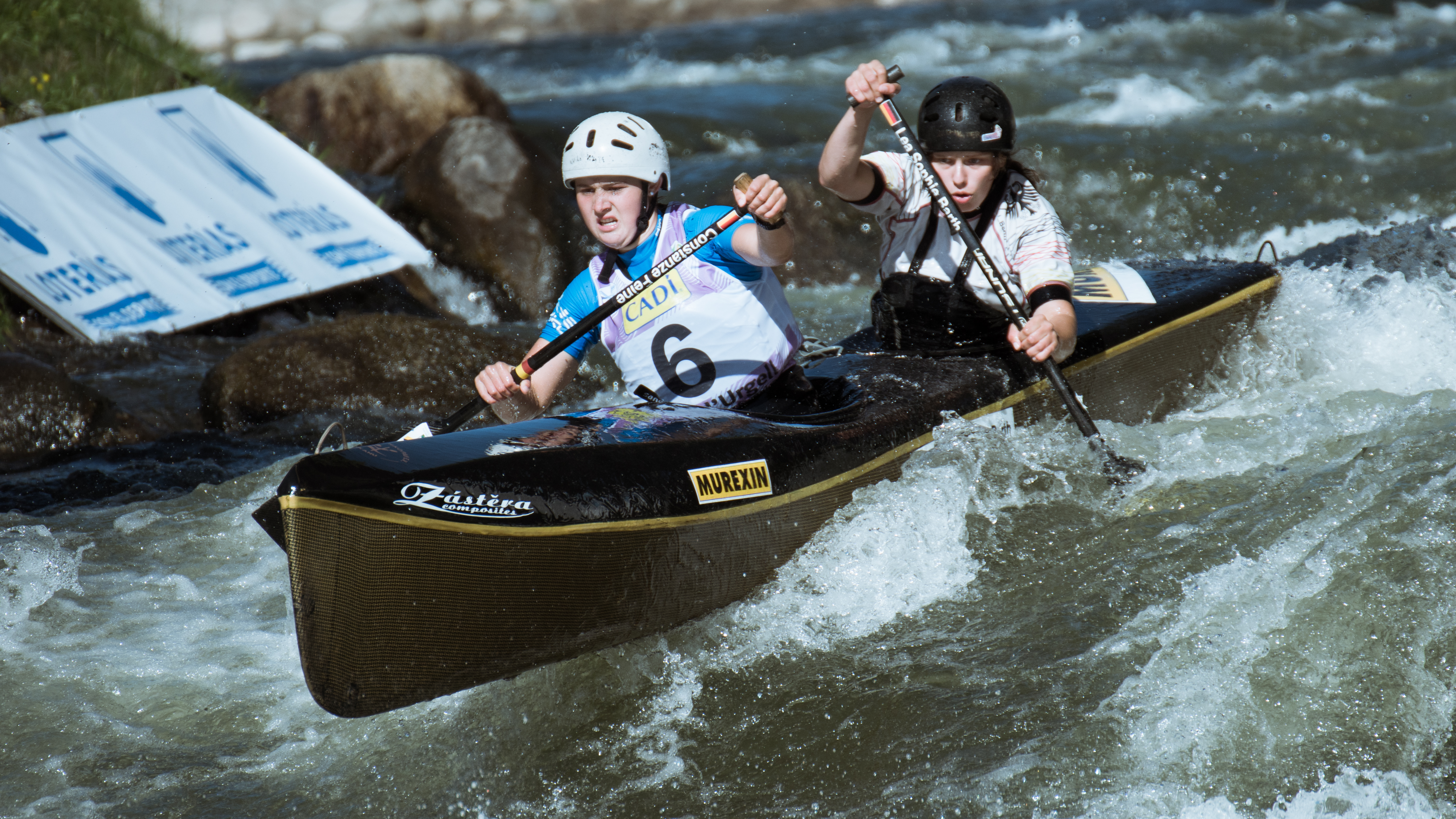
- Barth (on the right with the black helmet) with Constanze Feine in 2019

Personal information
- Nationality: German
- Born: 10 December 1998 (age 27) Sömmerda, Germany
- Height: 1.60 m (5 ft 3 in)

Sport
- Sport: Canoeing
- Event: Wildwater canoeing
- Club: Kanu-Club Sömmerda
Medal record
Event	1st	2nd	3rd
World Championships	0	0	2
U 23 Wildwater Canoeing World Championships	1	1	0

Lea Sophie Barth (born 10 December 1998 in Sömmerda) is a German female canoeist who won two medals at senior level at the Wildwater Canoeing World Championships.

== Medals at the World Championships ==
Senior

Year	1st place, gold medalist(s)	2nd place, silver medalist(s)	3rd place, bronze medalist(s)
2017	0	0	1
2019	0	0	1

U23

Year	1st place, gold medalist(s)	2nd place, silver medalist(s)	3rd place, bronze medalist(s)
2017	0	1	0
2019	1	0	0
