= Nat Falk =

American illustrator and cartoonist

Nat Falk (June 28, 1898 – September 9, 1989) was an American illustrator and cartoonist. His 1941 book How to Make Animated Cartoons was one of the first instructional books on animation in the United States, covering the work of a wide variety of animation studios including Warner Bros. and Terrytoons.

== Early life and education ==
Nathan Isaac Falk was born in Baltimore, Maryland, in 1898 to Lithuanian Jewish parents. He began drawing at a young age, becoming the art editor of The Club, the magazine of the Alliance Athletic and Literary Club of the Jewish Educational Alliance in Baltimore, in 1917. He studied art at the Maryland Institute, and then at the Pennsylvania Academy of the Fine Arts in Philadelphia.

== Career ==
In the 1920s Falk moved to New York, where he drew illustrations for various newspapers and magazines, on subjects ranging from health tips to anti-Nazi political satire. He also illustrated book covers, including for the long-running Tom Swift and Don Sturdy series.

In 1933 Falk published Magic Mother Goose, an illustrated collection of Mother Goose rhymes accompanied by a "magic glass" for viewing a hidden image in each picture. The following year he released Russian Folk Tales, a collection of six Russian folk stories for children, with Yock Schwab.

He published his best-known work, How to Make Animated Cartoons: The History and Technique, in 1941. It covered virtually all U.S. animation studios in existence at the time and included a foreword by Paul Terry, the founder of Terrytoons and creator of such characters as Mighty Mouse. The book was one of the first of its kind available in the early golden age of American animation, and it influenced future animators including Richard Williams, who led the animation of Who Framed Roger Rabbit.

Because recordings of many early animated cartoons have not survived, How to Make Animated Cartoons also serves as a useful record of the period in animation history.

== Personal life ==
In 1925, Falk married Katherine Sagal. The couple had two sons, the military historian Stanley L. Falk and the physicist David S. Falk.

He died in New York in 1989, at age 91.

== Selected works ==
- Magic Mother Goose (1933)
- Russian Folk Tales (1934)
- How to Make Animated Cartoons (1941)
- It's Fun to Draw (contributed, 1944)
