= Tomaz Vieira da Cruz =

Portuguese poet

Tomaz Vieira da Cruz (22 April 1900 – 7 June 1960) was a poet from Portugal. He was also a musician and journalist. His most well known poems are dedicated to his "bronze flower", a woman he loved. His poetry had an Angolan flavor. His "day job" was as a pharmacist's assistant. He was born in Constância and died in Lisbon.
