= Montalvo (Constância) =

- Civil parish
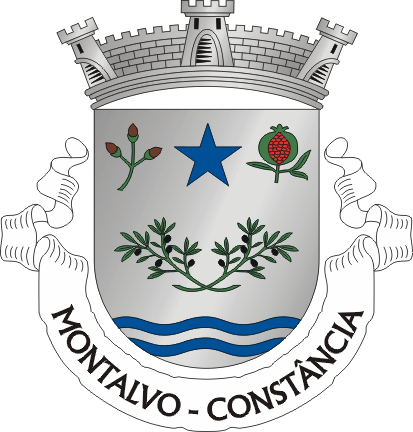
- Coat of arms

- Location in Portugal
- Coordinates: 39.485°N 8.300°W
- Country: Portugal
- Region: Oeste e Vale do Tejo
- Intermunic. comm.: Médio Tejo
- District: Santarém
- Municipality: Constância

Area
  - Total: 12.81 km^{2} (4.95 sq mi)

Population (2011)
  - Total: 1,275
  - Density: 100/km^{2} (260/sq mi)
- Time zone: UTC+00:00 (WET)
  - Summer (DST): UTC+01:00 (WEST)

Montalvo is a parish (freguesia) in the municipality of Constância in Portugal. The population in 2011 was 1,275, in an area of 12.81 km^{2}.
