= Augusto Barros =

Portuguese abstractionist painter

Augusto Barros Ferreira
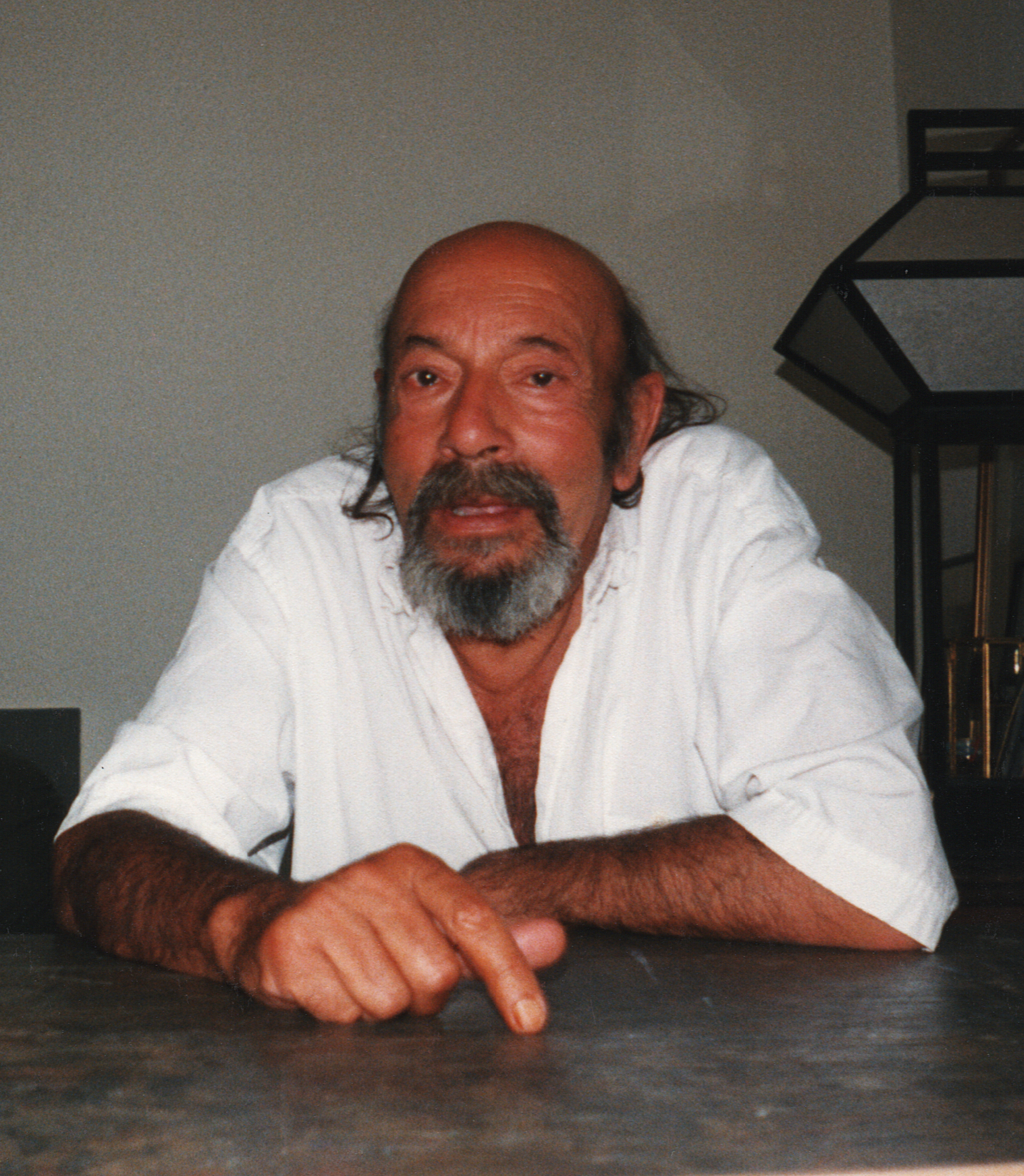
- Augusto Barros, photographed in Portugal in July 1997
- Born: August 7, 1929; Lisbon, Portugal
- Died: February 10, 1998 (aged 68); Lisbon
- Education: National Society of Fine Arts (Portugal), and Academy of Fine Arts in Hamburg (Germany)
- Known for: Painting
- Movement: Abstractionism

Augusto Barros Ferreira, better known as Augusto Barros, and simply Barros, is a Portuguese painter born on August 7, 1929, in Lisbon (Portugal), and dead on February 10, 1998, in Lisbon. Abstractionist painter, and emblematic figure of the Parisian district of Saint-Germain-des-Prés of the 1970s.

== Biography ==
=== Childhood and beginnings in Portugal ===
Augusto Barros is painting since the age of 10. His parents have a neighbor painter, which clearly sparked him an early interest in painting.

As a teenager, he often likes to go for a stroll at the Port of Lisbon, and contemplate the ocean. He sets himself the goal of going to the American continent, and for that purpose he learns English, on his own, through books and thanks to the travelers he meets at the port (so that at the age of 29, he was one of the interpreters of Queen Elizabeth II, visiting Portugal in 1957). This linguistic competence will prove very useful for the studies he will undertake later in Germany, instead of being able to speak German.

In 1952, at the age of 23, he studies painting and drawing at the SNBA (Portugal) with the master Machado da Luz. Then, it is as a model maker that he begins to earn a living. At the beach of Carcavelos (Portugal), Barros happily meets Helena Ferreira, a teacher, who he will marry shortly after. From this union are born two children, Carlos Augusto Ferreira and Virginia Maria Ferreira.

It's in 1959 that Barros exhibits his paintings for the first time to the public, at a Modern Art exhibition of the SNI (Palácio Foz, Portugal). Following this exhibition, he obtains a scholarship from the Calouste Gulbenkian Foundation, thanks to which he decides to go study in Germany. Indeed, like many other painters of his generation, Barros quickly realizes that he cannot succeed in his artistic career while remaining in Portugal. Neither the socio-cultural environment of the time, nor the political situation, were favorable to his formation and his inspiration.

=== Training in Germany ===
Barros therefore emigrated in 1961 to Hamburg (Germany), to take courses at the University of Fine Arts of Hamburg. He goes there alone, while remaining attached to his wife and children who have remained in Portugal. He spends nearly three years in Hamburg, two of which as a scholarship holder, during which he studies with the master Hans Thiemann, a former disciple of Paul Klee. Interesting detail, since it was written later that "there is something of the art of Klee in Barros".

He has his first solo exhibition on German soil in 1962, at the Galerie Commeter. This exhibition is a great success, and finds a large echo in the German press. Many articles appear in the newspapers Die Welt, Die Zeit, Hamburger Abendblatt, Bild and Frankfurter Allgemeine Zeitung, qualifying Barros' painting as being a "work of rigor, austerity, but also sensuality".

=== Artistic career in Paris ===
In 1963, Barros leave Germany and come for the first time to Paris, in the district of Saint-Germain-des-Prés. He is irresistibly drawn to this Paris center of the arts, but also to this "bohemian" Paris, which exudes freedom. Initially, he plans to stay there for a year or two, but he ends up settling there. It is indeed here that Barros feels at home, and it is there that he will establish great friendships, which will last until the end of his life. That same year 1963, Barros meets at the gallery "Le Divan" the Russian painter Serge Poliakoff, who will become a great friend. He also befriends the artists Viera da Silva and Árpád Szenes, as well as Manuel Cargaleiro, Eduardo Luiz, Gonçalo Duarte, Paul Szasz, and Pedro Avelar. His first individual exhibition in Paris is given at the Galerie des jeunes in 1963, following which articles are devoted to him in the newspapers Artigos (No. 918 of 1963/05/19) and Carrefour (Frank Elgar, No. 976 of 1963/05/29).

Later, in 1968, Barros meets Gualtieri di San Lazzaro, art critic and founder of the magazine XX^{e} siècle. In turn, this leads Barros to work closely with a number of artists who were already famous at the time, such as Man Ray, Alberto Magnelli, Émile Gilioli, Max Ernst, Miró, Sonia Delaunay and Camille Bryen. Following an exhibition at the Galerie de Beaune in 1969, subsequent articles appear in the newspapers Carrefour and Les Lettres Françaises. Through Marcelle Cahn, he gets to know the painter Jeanne Coppel, as well as the painter and art critic Michel Seuphor. Recognizing the quality of Barros' painting, he dedicates an article to him in the journal XX^{e} siècle (No. XXXIV, Panorama 70).

On the family side, however, because of his distance from Portugal, and therefore from his family, the situation becomes precarious. After 8 years of estrangement, his family is asking for him. He then decides to bring his wife and children to Paris, where they join him and move in that same year 1969.

Barros continues to make enriching encounters, for example in 1971, the year in which San Lazzaro introduced him to the poet and art critic Alain Jouffroy. In turn, he dedicated an article to him in the journal XX^{e} siècle (No. XXXIX, Panorama 72). Barros is then interviewed in 1973 by Jean-Jacques Lévêque, Henry Galy-Carles and André Parinaud in the television program Forum des arts on France Culture (ORTF). Articles are devoted to Barros in the newspapers Le Monde (Jean-Marie Dunoyer), and Le Figaro. Then in 1974, this is Egídio Álvaro's turn to dedicate a 3rd article to him in the magazine XX^{e} siècle (No. XLIII, Panorama 74, le surréalisme II).

From a professional and artistic point of view, he has a complete life. But Barros' life as an artist, and his bohemian, bon vivant, even seductive character, finally defeated his marriage. He divorced Helena in 1976. They remained on good terms nonetheless, Barros continuing to see her as "a friend, an ally". He will not marry again.

=== Between France and Portugal ===
During the 1980s, Barros divides his time between France and Portugal. When he is in Portugal, he lives in Porto Salvo in particular, which allows him to get closer to his daughter Virginia, and his sister Helena. At this time, however, his health begins to decline sharply. His bohemian life, and in particular the four packets of unfiltered Gauloises cigarettes he smokes every day, eventually catch up with him.

During this time, he continues to exhibit in France and Portugal. Notably in 1980, at the exhibition "Première Biennale Art & Papier" in Le Touquet (France), the French Secretary of State for Culture acquires a work by Augusto Barros (Témpera sobre papel) for the Musée d'Art Moderne de Paris.

He accepts several radio and television interviews. Articles appear in 1982 in several Portuguese newspapers, Diário de Notícias, and Diário Popular. Later, he is invited to represent Portugal at the 24th Olympiad of Contemporary Arts, held in Seoul (South Korea) during the 1988 Summer Olympics.

Then, in the early 1990s, Barros returns to Portugal definitively.

In all, he has exhibited individually 24 times, and participated in 38 collective exhibitions.

Barros dies on February 10, 1998, in Lisbon, at the age of 68.

== In the Saint-Germain-des-Prés district ==
For Manuel Cargaleiro, to define the person of Barros and his work, it is necessary to be familiar with the district of Saint-Germain-des-Prés, a worldwide crossroad of the arts since the 1950s, and until the end of the 1970s. This Parisian district was notably, according to Jean-Jacques Lévêque, the historical theater "of the last great battles between abstraction and figuration" in the 1960s. It is in such a context that Barros joined this cultural center, when he settled there in 1963.

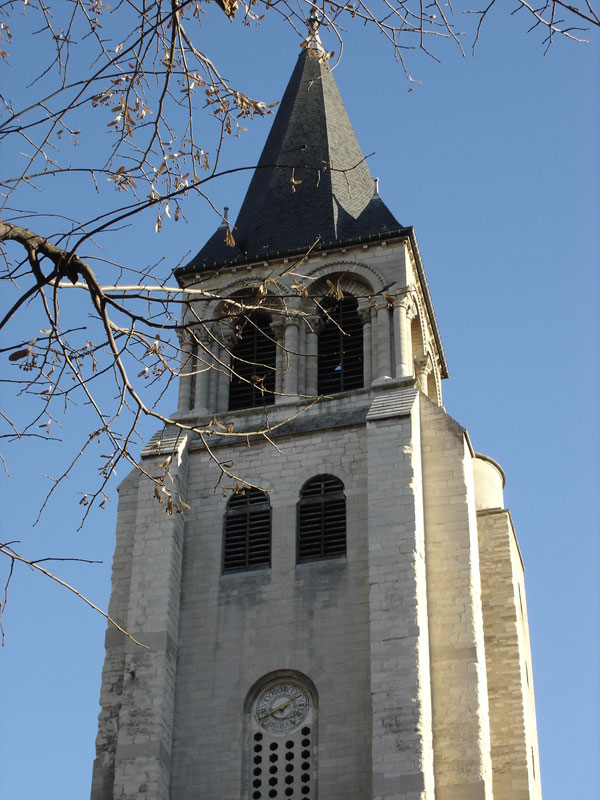
The tower of the Saint-Germain-des-Prés church, with its clock.

Barros is fond of this district, where his small workshop is located (he once had a large workshop on the outskirts of Paris, but he stayed there only a very short time; he missed Germain-des-Prés). He is used to walking past the clock of the tower of Saint-Germain-des-Prés, reports Jeannine Quintin, and thus knowing if it's time to go to the "bistro", where he likes to meet up with his friends Man Ray, Poliakoff, or even Marino Marini. According to Jorge Guimarães, "it's not with impunity" that Barros lives alongside Picasso, or that he meets at the café Hans Hartung or Henri Michaux. As for its regular buyers, we find particularly the Pompidou family, described as enlightened amateurs, and whose name is now more linked to contemporary art than to politics.

Barros is thus described as being an emblematic figure of the Saint-Germain-des-Prés district of the 1970s, where he is called "le Portuguais" [the Portuguese]. Man of sure meetings and friendships, he frequents many art critics, gallery directors, and famous artists. This is why it is said of Barros that he is not of any camp, any cenacle, but "companion of a few one of those whose legend has already taken hold".

== The "fleeing" man ==
Although he frequents the elite, Barros is one of those who doesn't seek stardom. It is said of him, actually, that he "rejects marketing as a traveling companion". Of a particular temperament, he has forged the reputation for not speaking when it is imposed, and allows himself to miss many interviews and television programs to which he is invited. However, on the other hand, he can enjoy chatting for a day with anyone coming unexpectedly.

This whole character can also be found in his relationship with art, and with the public. He is thus known to never make the slightest concession to the tastes of the public, or even to that of the merchants. When he had the honor of being invited to the 24th Olympiad of Contemporary Arts in Seoul, he needed to be arm-twisted, and hesitated for a long time before accepting. As success rarely follows those who shun it, his career has inevitably suffered. According to Jeannine Quintin, Barros is one of those "cursed artists, the purest, whom only posterity recognizes".

Thus, Barros can be described as a proud and upright man, but at the same time mysterious, capricious, modest. In short, to use the words of Jean-Jacques Lévêque, like a "fleeing" man.

== His painting ==
=== Techniques and colors ===
If he occasionally paints in oil, Augusto Barros' favorite technique is undoubtedly the gouache, many people recognizing him as a major gouachist. The density of the gouache, associated with a grainy paper, allow him to obtain a rendering of its own, producing a slightly rough texture, in line with the themes of his painting. Finely torn paper and cardboard sometimes also appear in his works

Colors often vary around bluish grays and ashy whites. For Jean-Marie Dunoyer, it is the painting of "architectures in the process of demolition", in reference to post-war Paris, but also "interior landscapes, rigor, austerity". At the same time, Barros also practices a more colorful painting, showing dull reds, orange ochres, different shades of blue, and predominantly black and white shapes and textures. He thus oscillates between these two types of painting – one austere and quasi-geometric, and the other sensual, even luxuriant.

In a dictionary, Barros is thus described as a painter making use of an "abstractizing constructivism in muted colors". Indeed, it is often said that his painting is motivated by emotions alone. According to Jean-Jacques Lévêque for example, the painter abandons himself "to the solicitations of the emotions", thus going beyond the problem of representation. Jean-Marie Dunoyer, for his part, wrote that Barros' painting is much more than a technical feat, that his painting became flesh, "a living flesh, in direct contact with the emotion it gave birth"

=== Influences and evolution ===
Although we can perceive in his works the idiom of certain known currents (such as monochromy, or materiology), it is said of Barros' painting that it escapes the schools and the reigning theories, none of them being found as a "reductive finality". On the contrary, his painting is described as the result of a pleasure to paint, and a freedom of expression guided only by emotions. It is well known that Barros never paints upon request, nor according to the tastes of the public, but only when the need arises

His palette is not exempt from influences, and it changes significantly during his life. Barros thus relates that, during his stay in Hamburg, his palette changed, the nostalgia and the climate having made him abandon bright and violent colors in favor of shades of gray. But it is not always the case, since on certain occasions Barros knows perfectly how to create colorful paintings, which he offers to his relatives.

For Alain Jouffroy, in addition to the contemplation of the old Parisian walls, which we find in filigree in many of his works, the painting of Nicolas de Staël or Poliakoff must have served as a stimulus for Barros, and thus play a trigger role in front of the white paper. Music also plays an important role. It is thus said of Barros that he particularly appreciates devoting himself to painting in the evening, listening to classical music. He also sometimes paints with jazz in the background, but he never leaves these two registers

For Ricardo Barletta, Italian art critic, we find in Barros' painting the same nostalgia and the same sadness as in Fado, a Portuguese musical genre. However, one will write that Barros is penalized neither by his origins, nor by his culture. For Manuel Cargaleiro, Barros' painting has very little Portuguese, and a lot of French, "Parisian" lyricism, linked to impressionism, cubism and post-war abstractionism. He thus defines Barros as a lyrical painter, attached to the Ecole de Paris, but whose work is very personal, difficult at first, because intimately linked to his person. Jean-Jacques Lévêque, for his part, wrote that Barros' painting "ended up resembling the man who made it"

== Tributes ==
Two streets are dedicated to him in Portugal, bearing the name of Rua Augusto Barros, in Linda-a-Velha (Oeiras), and Charneca de Caparica (Almada).

== Exhibitions ==
=== Individual exhibitions ===
- Galerie Commeter, Hamburg (Germany), 1962
- Galerie des jeunes, Paris, 1963
- National Society of Fine Arts (SNBA), Lisbon, 1964
- Galerie de Beaune, Paris, 1969. Exhibition presented by Suzanne de Coninck
- Galeria São Francisco, Lisbon, 1971
- Galeria São Francisco, Lisbon, 1972. Exhibition presented by the art critic Egídio Álvaro
- Galerie L.55, Paris, 1973. Exhibition presented by the journalist Jean-Marie Dunoyer
- Galeria Dinastia, Lisbon, 1974
- Calouste Gulbenkian Foundation Cultural Center, Paris, 1974
- Galeria Alvarez-Dois, Porto (Portugal), 1979
- Galeria Tempo, Lisbon, 1979
- Galeria de arte do casino Estoril, Portugal, "Paysages intérieurs", 1982
- Alliance française, Lisbon, "Mon beau Paris", 1984
- Galeria de arte do casino Estoril, Portugal, 1984
- International Art Gallery, Paris, 1985
- Alliance française, Lisbon, "Barros 85", 1985
- Edifício Chiado, Coimbra (Portugal), 1986
- Galeria I.A.M., Lisbon, 1986
- Alliance française, Lisbon, 1988
- Centre de arte Unibanco, Lisbon, 1989
- Alliance française, Lisbon, "Augusto Barros, recent paintings", 1991
- Galeria da secretaria regional de turismo, Funchal (Madeira), 1992
- Galeria de São Bento, Lisbon, "works from the 60s and 70s", 1997

=== Collective exhibitions ===
- Galeria national de arte, Lisbon, "Augusto Barros & Álvaro Pereira", 1963
- Galerie Eva Eyquem, Paris, 1964
- Institut de beauté Elizabeth Arden, Paris, 1964
- Árvore Gallery, Porto (Portugal), 1965
- Cultural Center of Brussels, Belgium, "8 Portuguese painters", 1967
- Maison du Portugal, Paris, "Portuguese painters of Paris", 1967
- Souza-Cardoso Gallery, Brussels, "The Portuguese painters", 1968
- Salon Réalités Nouvelles No. 25, Paris, 1971
- Salon Réalités Nouvelles No. 26, Paris, 1972
- Municipal Theater of Esch-sur-Alzette, Luxembourg, 1973
- Maison de la culture de Saint-Étienne, France, 1973
- Galerie L.55, Paris, "Confrontations", 1973
- Galeria São Francisco, Lisbon, "Diálogo 74", 1974
- Salon Réalités nouvelles No. 27, Paris, 1974
- Fondation nationale des arts graphiques et plastiques, Paris, "Les Huns", 1978
- Cultural Center of Brétigny-sur-Orge, France, "Peinture portugaise actuelle", 1978
- Primeira Bienal de Arte, Vila Nova de Cerveira (Portugal), 1978
- Exhibition Identidade cultural e massificação, 1978
- First Art & Paper Biennial of Le Touquet, France, 1980
- Carrefour de l'Europe, Nantes (France), "Avec les peintres portugais contemporains", 1981
- Galerie d'art international, Paris, 1981
- Zarathustra Galery, Milan, "Arte incontro", 1981
- Ministry of Culture, Lisbon, "Artistas portugueses residentes no estrangeiro", 1982
- Salon Réalités nouvelles No. 36, Paris, 1982
- Commemorative exhibition of Portugal Day, Figueira da Foz, 1982
- Alliance française, Lisbon, "Pintores portugueses de Paris", 1983
- Galeria de arte do casino Estoril, Portugal, "25 anos ao serviço da arte e da cultura", 1983
- Universidade Nova de Lisboa, Lisbon, 1984
- Galeria Almada Negreiros, 1984
- Galeria de Constância, Portugal, 1987
- 24th Olympiad for Contemporary Arts, Seoul (South Korea), 1988
- Exhibition Exponor II, Porto (Portugal), 1989
- Galeria de Constância, Portugal, 1989
- Exhibition Exponor III, Porto (Portugal), 1990
- Galeria triângulo 48, Lisbon, 1990
- Galeria de arte do casino Estoril, Portugal, "Salão Pequeno Formato", 1990
- Galeria de arte do casino Estoril, Portugal, "Salão de outono", 1990
- Galeria de arte do casino Estoril, Portugal, "Salão de outono XII", 1991
- Galeria de arte do casino Estoril, Portugal, "Augusto Barros & Edgardo Xavier", 1992
- Galeria de arte do casino Estoril, Portugal, "Uma galeria com história", 1993
- Galeria de arte do casino Estoril, Portugal, "Salão de outono XIII", 1994
- Artes plásticas, Beja (Portugal), "Pintura e escultura", 1997

== Appendices ==
=== Bibliography ===
- Egídio Álvaro, Panorama 74 – Le surréalisme II, XX^{e} siècle (magazine), No. XLIII, December 1974
- Alain Jouffroy, Panorama 72 – II, XX^{e} siècle (magazine), No. XXXIX, December 1972
- Michel Seuphor, Panorama 70 – I, XX^{e} siècle (magazine), No. XXXIV, June 1970
- Michel Seuphor, L'Art abstrait [Abstract Art], Paris, Maeght, 1970/1974
- Jean-Jacques Lévêque, Art et architecture actuels 32e année, No. 176, Paris, Cimaise, 1985 ISSN 0009-6830
- Fernando de Pamplona, Dicionário de Pintores e Escultores Portugueses ["Dictionary of Portuguese painters and sculptors"], Vol. 1, Porto, Livraria civilização editora, 1987, (2nd ed. Actualizada)
- Michael Tannock, Portuguese 20th century artists: A biographical dictionary, Stroud, Phillimore & Co Ltd, 1978/01/01

=== Related Articles ===
- Abstract art
- Saint-Germain-des-Prés
