= De Barros =

De Barros may refer to:

People

- Adhemar de Barros (1901-1969), Brazilian politician
- Adhemir de Barros (b. 1942), Brazilian footballer known as Paraná (footballer)
- Adriana de Barros (b. 1976), Portuguese and Canadian illustrator, web designer, and poet
- António Thomas Santos de Barros (b. 1986), Brazilian footballer known as Thomaz (footballer)
- Bruno de Barros (b. 1987), Brazilian sprinter
- Cássio Alves de Barros (b. 1970), Brazilian footballer
- Fortunato de Barros (b. 1916), Brazilian fencer
- Henrique de Barros (1904-2000), Portuguese politician
- João de Barros (1496-1570), Portuguese historian
- João Ribeiro de Barros (1900-1947), Brazilian aviator
- Jose Acacio de Barros (b. 1967), Brazilian-American physicist and philosopher
- José Leitão de Barros (1896-1967), Portuguese film director and playwright
- Luísa de Barros, Countess of Barral ( ? - ? ), Brazilian noble
- Luiz de Barros (1893-1982), Brazilian film director, film producer, film editor, screenwriter, cinematographer, film actor, and set designer and manager
- Manoel de Barros (1916-2014), Brazilian poet
- Maria de Barros (b. ? ), Senegalese-born Cape Verdean singer
- Osvaldo Velloso de Barros (1908-1996), Brazilian footballer
- Rui Duarte de Barros (b. 1960), Transitional Prime Minister of Guinea-Bissau (2012-2014)
- Théo de Barros (b. 1943), Brazilian composer
- Viriato de Barros (b. ? ), Cape Verdean writer

Other

- Estádio Cornélio de Barros, a stadium in Salgueiro, Brazil
- Estádio Wilson Fernandes de Barros, former name of Estádio Romildo Vitor Gomes Ferreira, a stadium in Moji-Mirim, São Paulo, Brazil
- Rodovia Adhemar de Barros, a highway in the state of São Paulo, Brazil
- Tierra de Barros, a comarca in Badajoz, Extremadura, Spain
