= Lake Constance (disambiguation) =

Lake Constance is a major European lake between Germany, Switzerland, and Austria.

Lake Constannce or Constance Lake may also refer to:

- Lake Constance (New Zealand), a lake on South Island
- Jezioro Bodenskie (Lake of Constance), a 1986 Polish film directed by Janusz Zaorski

== Ontario, Canada ==
- Constance Lake (Algoma District), a lake of Ontario
- Constance Lake (Cochrane District), a lake of Ontario
- Constance Lake (Ottawa); see Geography of Ottawa
- Constance Lake (Timiskaming District), a lake of Ontario
- Constance Lake First Nation, an Anisininew First Nation in northeastern Ontario, Canada
  - Constance Lake 92, a reserve of the Constance Lake First Nation

== United States ==
- Constance Lake, a lake in Wright County, Minnesota; see List of lakes of Minnesota

== See also ==
- Constance (disambiguation)
