= Saint Constantine =

Saint Constantine may refer to:

- Constantine I (c. 272 – 337), Roman Emperor and a convert to Christianity
- Constantine of Dumnonia (6th century), King of Cornwall
- Constantine of Strathclyde (6th century), probably fictitious King of Strathclyde
- Constantine (British saint), various figures of this name
- Constantine the Jew (fl. c.850–886), Byzantine monk
- Constantine XI, last Byzantine emperor, unofficial Catholic Saint
- St Cyril, born Constantine, Christian theologian from Thessalonica and Christian missionary among the Slavs with his brother Methodius
