= Jose Acacio de Barros =

Brazilian physicist and philosopher

José Acacio de Barros (born 1967, Barra Mansa, RJ, Brazil) is a Brazilian-American physicist and philosopher with contributions to the foundations of quantum mechanics, quantum cosmology, and quantum cognition.

== Education ==
de Barros received his PhD in Physics from the Centro Brasileiro de Pesquisas Fisicas (CBPF) in 1991, under the supervision of Francisco Antonio Doria and Newton da Costa, with Antonio Fernandes da Fonseca Teixeira listed as co-advisor.

== Career ==
Since 2007, de Barros has been on the faculty of San Francisco State University, first under Liberal Studies, later as Professor of Philosophy and Director of the School of Liberal Studies. Prior to 2007, de Barros was an associate professor of physics at the Federal University at Juiz de Fora, Brazil (continuing through 2011), was a visiting associate professor at the Center for the Study of Language and Information at Stanford University, and held visiting positions at the Centro Brasileiro de Pesquisas Fisicas.

== Notable work ==
de Barros has been a long-term collaborator of Philosopher Patrick Suppes, with whom he published extensively on the foundations of quantum mechanics and joint probabilities. de Barros' joint research with Nelson Pinto-Neto, in which Bohm's interpretation of quantum mechanics was applied to quantum cosmology, paved the way for bouncing models using realistic interpretation of quantum mechanics. More recent work focuses on providing a neurophysiological foundation to quantum-like effects in psychology. In collaboration with Gary Oas, de Barros is among the main proponents of the use of negative probabilities to understand quantum systems.
