= Constance Smith (disambiguation) =

Constance Smith (1929–2003) was an Irish actress.

Constance Smith may also refer to:

- Constance Smith (civil servant) (1859–1930), English novelist and civil servant
- Constance Smith (née Herbert) (1785–1829), wife of a British diplomat John Spencer Smith, known as Florence in several Byron's poems
- Constance Smith (tennis) (1860–1934), English tennis player
- Constance Adelaide Smith (1878–1938), Englishwoman responsible for the reinvigoration of Mothering Sunday in the British Isles in the 1910s and 1920s
- Constance Babington Smith (1912–2000), British journalist and writer, worked in imagery intelligence
- Constance Isabel Smith (1894–after 1932), British novelist
- Constance Christine Smith (1942–disappeared 1952), 10-year-old American girl who vanished from Lakeville, Connecticut, see disappearance of Connie Smith
- Connie Smith (born 1941), American country music singer and songwriter
