= F. Woodbridge Constant =

American physicist

Frank Woodbridge "Woodie" Constant (June 1, 1904, Minneapolis – November 16, 1988, Essex, Connecticut) was an American physicist. He was elected a Fellow of the American Physical Society in 1937.

== Biography ==
His father was Frank Henry Constant (1859–1950), a professor of civil engineering, first at the University of Minnesota and then at Princeton University. F. Woodbridge Constant graduated in 1925 with a B.S. in physics from Princeton University and in 1928 with a Ph.D. in physics from Yale University, where he held Sloane and Loomis Fellowships. During the summer of 1926, F. Woodbridge Constant, the organist Hobart Augustus Whitman (1905–1952), and Hassler Whitney joined Woodie's father Professor Frank Henry Constant in Switzerland, where the team of four climbed the Wetterhorn. Later the three young men climbed together in the Adirondack Mountains. As a postdoc F. Woodbridge Constant was from 1928 to 1930 a National Research Fellow at Caltech. From 1930 to 1946 he was a faculty member in Duke University's mathematics department. For the academic year 1933–1934 he was on leave at the University of Cambridge, where he studied under P. A. M. Dirac and assisted John Cockcroft in research on nuclear physics. During WW II, Constant was on leave from 1942 to 1946 as a research physicist in a sound ranging project developed by the National Defense Research Committee and, subsequently, the Office of Scientific Research and Development. As an associate professor at Duke University, he resigned in 1946 to become a professor and department head at Trinity College in Hartford, Connecticut. There he continued as department head until 1970 and he retired in 1972 as professor emeritus.

Constant did research on ferromagnetism. He wrote a 2-volume textbook on theoretical physics at the first-year graduate level.

Upon his death he was survived by his widow, two daughters, and a son.
