= Constance, Minnesota =

Unincorporated community in Minnesota, US

Coordinates: 45°15′19″N 93°17′08″W

Constance was an unincorporated community in Anoka County, Minnesota, United States. The site of Constance village, now abandoned, is within the present boundaries of the city of Andover.

== History ==
Constance was founded in section 13 of the former Grow Township prior to 1897, and had a post office from 1897 to 1955. Constance formerly had a station along the former Burlington Northern Railroad. Little trace of Constance itself remains, and Grow Township incorporated as the city of Andover in 1973, but Constance Boulevard remains a main two-lane roadway in the local area.
