= Constant Fouard =

French ecclesiastical writer

Constant Fouard (6 August 1837 at Elbeuf, near Rouen – 1903) was a French ecclesiastical writer.

== Life ==
His early life was a preparation for the work on which his fame rests. He studied the classics at Bois-Guillaume, philosophy at Issy (1855–1857), and made his theological studies at Saint-Sulpice, Paris (1857–1861). Along his professors at Paris were Abbé John Logan, who remained throughout life the inspirer and mentor of his studies and Abbe Le Hir, who initiated him and his fellow disciple Fulcran Vigouroux into Biblical science, to which they devoted their lives.

He was ordained priest in 1861 and entered the "Solitude", the novitiate of the Sulpicians, but left on account of illness after several months without joining the society. He taught for some time at Bois-Guillaume, then pursued the study of classics at the Collège Sainte-Barbe, Paris, obtained the degree of Licentiate in Letters, 1867, and resumed; the teaching of classics at Bois-Guillaume, taking the class of rhetoric, 1867–1876. His piety drawing him to sacred sciences, he was appointed by the State (1876) to the chair of Holy Scripture in the faculty of theology at Rouen; he continued however to reside at Bois-Guillaume and to share in the duty of governing the student-body.

Honours came to him: he was made doctor of theology (1877), canon of the cathedral of Rouen (1884) and member of the Biblical Commission (1903). He travelled in Palestine, Syria, Greece, and Italy.

His teaching ceased when the Faculty of Theology was forcibly closed down c. 1884.

== Works ==
His writings include:

- La Vie de N-S Jésus-Christ (1880);
- Saint Pierre et les premières années du Christianisme (1886);
- Saint Paul, ses Missions (1892);
- Saint Paul, ses dernières années (1897);
- Saint Jean et la fin de l'Âge Apostolique (posthumous, 1904).

The dates witness, incidentally, to the extremely painstaking character of his labours. All these books form part of one grand work, Les Origines de l'Eglise, which Fouard wrote as an answer to the presentation of the same subject by Ernest Renan, who like himself had seen a pupil of le Hir.

Each successive book of the Abbé Fouard immediately gained a wide popularity and was translated into nearly all the language of Europe. His works are not remarkable in originality of view or acuteness of critical insight, but present a picture of early Christianity.
