= HMS Constance =

Six ships of the Royal Navy have borne the name HMS Constance, whilst another was planned:

- HMS Constance was a 22-gun sixth rate that the French launched in 1794 and that the British captured in 1797. The French recaptured her in 1806; she grounded and was salvaged in December, and condemned in February 1807.
- HMS Constance was to have been a 36-gun fifth rate. She was ordered in 1833 but cancelled in 1844.
- HMS Constance (1838) was a 3-gun schooner launched in 1838 and sold in 1877.
- HMS Constance (1846) was a 50-gun fourth rate launched in 1846. She was converted to steam propulsion in 1862 and was sold in 1875.
- HMS Constance (1880) was a screw corvette launched in 1880 and sold in 1899.
- HMS Constance (1915) was a C-class light cruiser launched in 1915 and sold in 1936.
- HMS Constance (R71) was a C-class destroyer launched in 1944 and broken up in 1956.
