= Constanze Feine =

German canoeist

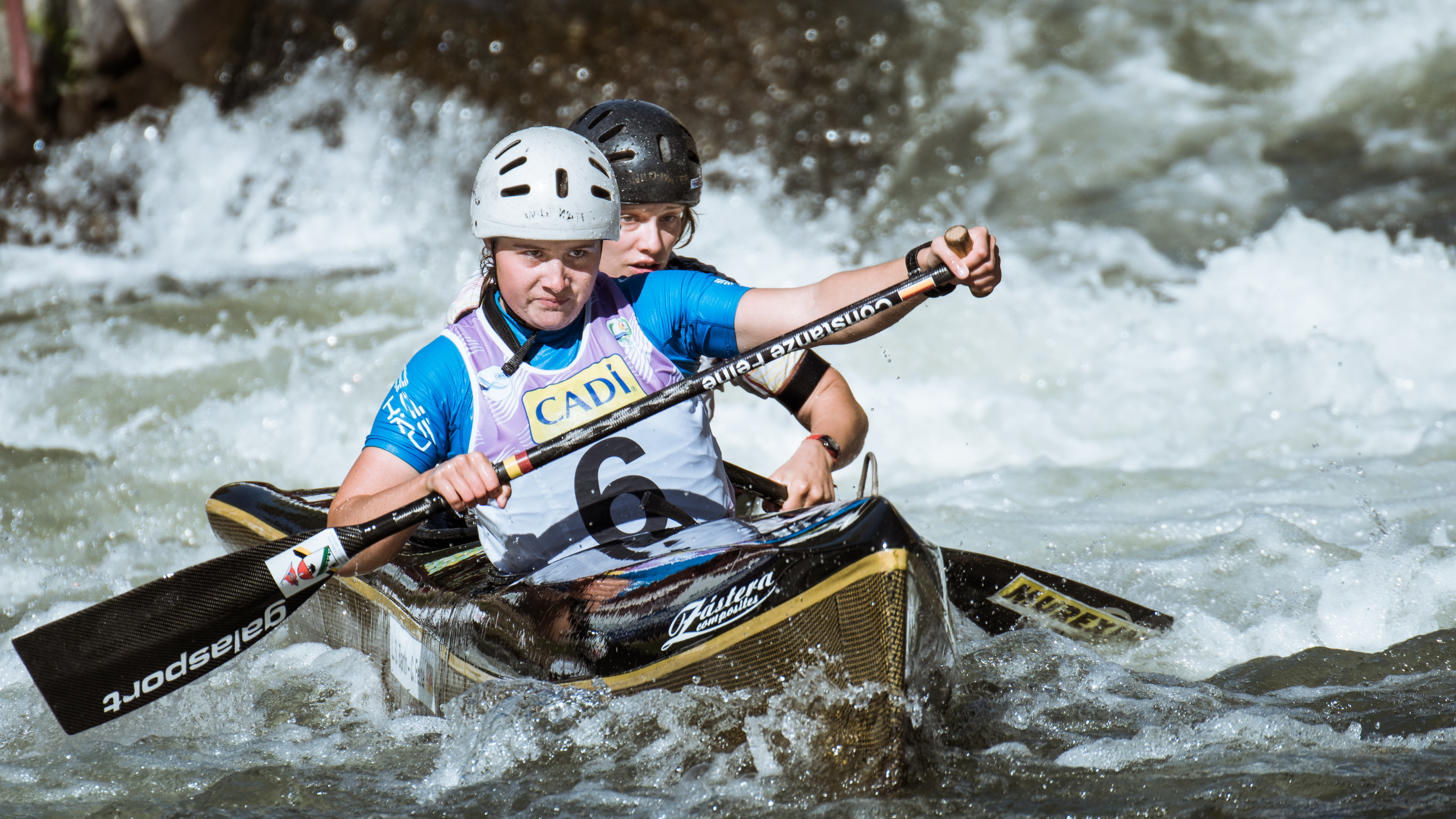
- Feine (with the #6 and white helmet) with Lea Sophie Barth in 2019

Personal information
- Nationality: German
- Born: 4 December 1999 (age 26) Germany

Sport
- Sport: Canoeing
- Event: Wildwater canoeing

Constanze Feine (born 4 December 1999) is a German female canoeist who was 5th in the C2 sprint senior final at the 2019 Wildwater Canoeing World Championships.

== Achievements ==
| Year | Competition | Venue | Rank | Event | Time |
|---|---|---|---|---|---|
| 2019 | World Championships | (Spain) La Seu d'Urgell | 5th | C2 sprint | 1:09.67 |
