= Connie Adam =

English fencer (1927–2021)

- Born: Constance M. Varvel; 1927; Norwich, England
- Died: 2021 (aged 93–94); Norwich, England
- Occupation: Fencer
- Known for: Veteran fencing; being the first Lady Freeman of Norwich

Connie Adam (née Constance Varvel; 1927–2021) was a champion fencer and the first woman Freeman of Norwich. Although she did not take up fencing until retirement, Adam won 140 medals in the sport, and was crowned both European and Commonwealth champion.

== Early life ==
Constance Varvel was born in Norwich in 1927, and raised by her grandparents. She obtained her first paid work at around the age of 7, and left Angel Road School at 14, finding work at Steward & Patteson's Brewery on a bottling machine. The following year, in 1942, bomb damage forced she and her grandparents out of their home. At 17, she became a taxi driver in Norwich - possibly the only woman taxi driver in the city at that time.

In 1948, she married James M. Adam. This required her to leave Steward & Patteson's, with a marriage bar in place. The couple had three children: Pamela, Robert and Ian. Throughout her marriage, Adam worked a variety of jobs to help support the family, including for 27 years as a driver for a businessman.

== Fencing ==
Adam took up fencing at the age of 60 after attending a 'come and try day' organised by Norwich City Council. She trained at the Norfolk Fencing Club, and travelled nationally and internationally for competitions. Adam went on to win more than 100 medals, including bronze at the World Veteran Championships in 2011, held in Croatia.

In recognition of her sporting achievements, Adam was asked to carry the Olympic torch when it passed through Norwich in 2012. She described this as a "once-in-a-lifetime experience". Adam acted as an ambassador for Active Norfolk, and was featured as part of the University of East Anglia's Sportspark’s This Girl Can campaign, as well as that of British Fencing. James Craig of British Fencing said of Adam: "At British Fencing we want to share Connie’s story further to help inspire women and girls at any age and at any ability to have a go at fencing."

Adam retired from fencing in 2019 at the age of 91, citing the unmanageable weight of the kit she travelled with rather than any decrease in fitness. In 2020, she was named by the Eastern Daily Press as one of Norfolk's "Sporting Heroes".

== Freeman of Norwich ==
An illegitimate child, Adam did not meet her father until 1977, when she was almost 50 years old. Her father was a Freeman of the City of Norwich, and Adam was disappointed to discover that women were not able to take the honour. Alongside others, she launched a campaign to enable women to become Freemen of the city. Following ten years of campaigning, the efforts were successful, and a special ceremony held at St. Andrew's Hall admitted 250 women as Freemen. With her surname beginning with 'A', Adam was the first.

== Death and legacy ==
Connie Adam died in 2021 at the age of 93. Fencing magazine The Sword wrote that "Norfolk and fencing have lost one of its inspirational characters but her spirit will live on amongst those who have known her."

That year on International Women's Day, Adam's name was painted on a stone as part of a project to honour notable women from Norfolk by the Rosie’s Plaques project. Others featured included Amelia Opie, Sophia Duleep Singh, and Joyce Lambert.
