= Ignacio Achurra =

Chilean lawyer and actor (born 1979)

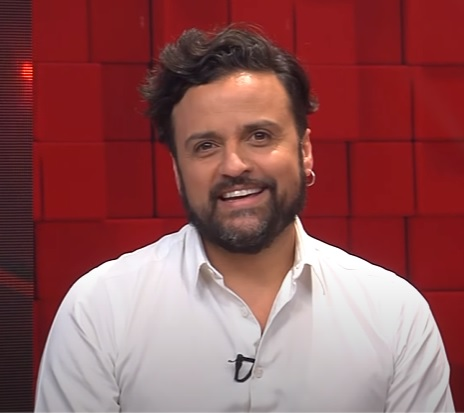

Member of the Chamber of Deputies
- Incumbent
- Assumed office 11 March 2026
- Constituency: 14th District

Member of the Constitutional Convention
- In office 4 July 2021 – 4 July 2022
- Constituency: 14th District

Personal details
- Born: 17 October 1979 (age 46) Santiago, Chile
- Party: Social Convergence; Broad Front
- Other political affiliations: Autonomist Movement
- Parent: Patricio Achurra
- Relatives: Herman Chadwick (grandfather)
- Education: University of Chile (Lic. Arts); Pontifical Catholic University of Chile (Master of Arts)
- Occupation: Constituent
- Profession: Actor

Ignacio Jaime Achurra Díaz (born 17 October 1979) is a Chilean lawyer and actor who is member of the Chilean Constitutional Convention.

== Early life and education ==
Achurra was born in Santiago on 17 October 1979. He is the son of actor and politician Patricio Achurra Garfias, who served as mayor of Paine from 2004 to 2008 and as a municipal councillor from 2012 to 2016, and Ximena Díaz Candia.

He completed his primary and secondary education at Colegio Notre Dame, graduating in 1997. He later studied theatre at the University of Chile, earning a Licentiate degree in Arts with a specialization in Acting. He subsequently obtained a Master’s degree in Arts from the Pontifical Catholic University of Chile.

== Artistic and academic career ==
Achurra has worked extensively as a theatre and television actor, playwright, and academic. He served as artistic director of the theatre company La Patriótico Interesante, co-artistic director of FITKA (International Street Theatre Festival, Santiago), and artistic director and producer of the street theatre group Contrataque. He was also a member of the Chilean Network of Festivals.

In addition to his artistic work, Achurra has taught at several universities, including Universidad Finis Terrae, Universidad Santo Tomás, and the University of Chile.

== Political career ==
Achurra was a member of the Social Convergence party.

He served as president of SIDARTE, the Chilean union representing actors, actresses, and theatre workers.

In the elections of 15–16 May 2021, he ran as a candidate for the Constitutional Convention in the 14th district of the Metropolitan Region as part of the Apruebo Dignidad coalition. He was elected with 29,524 votes, corresponding to 9.75% of the valid votes cast.

Within the Constitutional Convention, Achurra initially participated in the Commission on Communications, Information and Transparency. He later joined the thematic Commission on Knowledge Systems, Cultures, Science, Technology, Arts and Heritage, serving as its coordinator from October 2021 to February 2022. In May 2022, he began work in the Commission on Transitional Provisions.

In June 2023, it was announced that Achurra would assume the position of Director of the Division of Social Organizations (División de Organizaciones Sociales), an agency under the Ministry General Secretariat of Government.
