= Constance railway station =

Disused railway station in New South Wales, Australia

Constance was a former loco depot and stop on the Wolgan Valley Railway. It was built as a turning triangle with a locomotive sheds, coaling and watering facilities and a crossing loop. The three Shay locomotives that worked the line were maintained here. Constance is located three miles from Newnes. However, it was closed in 1917 when the equipment was moved to the Oil Works site.
