= Connie (freestyle singer) =

American singer

Connie Martinez, better known as Connie, is a singer of freestyle music and dance-pop. Connie is best known for her singles "Funky Little Beat" and "Rock Me". These songs catapulted the singer into the international music scene and the songs are now considered classics of the freestyle music genre.

== Biography ==
Connie was born and raised in Miami, Florida. She always aspired to perform since childhood. This aspiration became a realization when she was introduced to the music producer Henry Stone, who would go on to become the executive producer of Connie's debut single "Funky Little Beat" along with the track's co-producer Amos Larkins II.

In the early 1990s, Connie took a step back from the music scene when she married and later gave birth to her daughter. Since then, Connie has returned to the studio and released various albums.

Connie has performed with music legends Kool & The Gang, Evelyn Champagne King, Morris Day, Vanilla Ice, MC Shy D, Sugarhill Gang, Taylor Dayne, and fellow freestyle peers. In 2015, Connie reunited with "Connie" album producer Amos Larkins to release her newest album "Amos Larkins Presents Party Time 1".

Connie continues performing in concerts and clubs throughout the United States.

== Discography ==
=== Studio albums ===
Year	Album details
1986	Connie: Released: 1986; Label: Sunnyview Records
1995	No Tears: Released: April 16, 1995; Label: Black Olive Records
2006	Let's Party: Released: November 7, 2006; Label: CD Baby
2015	Amos Larkins Presents Party Time 1: Released: August 25, 2015; Label: Essential Media Group

=== Compilations ===
Year	Album details
2002	The Best of Connie: Released: October 29, 2002; Label: Thump Records

=== Singles ===
- 1985: "Funky Little Beat"
- 1986: "Experience"
- 1986: "Rock Me / I Can't Stop"
- 1987: "Get Down Tonight"
- 1988: "Tonight's the Night"
- 1989: "Rockin ' Rollin Weekend"
- 1993: "Funky Little Beat / Get Down Tonight"
- 1995: "No Tears"
