= Constanza =

Constanza as a place may refer to:

- Constanza, Dominican Republic
- Constanța, Romania

Constanza may also refer to:

- R v Constanza (The Crown against Gaetano Constanza), an English legal case in 1997
- José Constanza (born 1983), Dominican baseball player
- Constanza Alonso (born 1986), Argentine politician

== See also ==
- Constance (disambiguation), especially members of the Spanish-speaking nobility, born 'Constanza'
- Constanze Mozart (1762–1842), wife of Wolfgang Amadeus Mozart
- Costanza (disambiguation)
