= Constance, Lady Crabtree =

Comedy entertainer since April 1978

Constance, Lady Crabtree is a public speaker and comedy entertainer and has now been performing on stage, radio and television for almost fifty years.

Lady Crabtree's first radio broadcast was as a celebrity panellist on a BBC Radio 2 quiz show Funny Peculiar (1982) with Gyles Brandreth, Sandra Dickinson, Barry Cryer, Clement Freud, Roger Cook, Magnus Pyke and June Whitfield. Early television appearances included BBC 1's Pebble Mill at One and Daytime Live (1988) and ITV's The James Whale Show (1990); Lady Crabtree has since broadcast on radio and television worldwide; in February 2008 she was one of Dame Margot Hamilton's guests on BBC Three's Upstaged series and in 2013 was interviewed on the Scott Spears Now show for American television following the birth of Prince George. 2028 will mark Lady Crabtree's 50th anniversary in public life.

Lady Crabtree is the author of two books:The Secret Journals of Queen Elizabeth II (Columbus 1988 and Virgin Books 1990) and The Secret Royal Love Letters (Virgin Books 1990).

== Character history ==
Born Constance May Rose Battersby in Warrior Square Gardens, St Leonards-on-Sea, East Sussex, on 1 May 1948; her twin sister Millicent was delivered shortly afterwards. This was not only a shock to their mother - who had not realised that she was pregnant - but even more of a surprise to people strolling through the Square. With parents in the theatre,(performing as the variety act The Gay Goslings) the girls travelled widely throughout their childhood, and attended various schools for short periods. Constance completed her education at Madame Bernice's Academy of Refinement and Beauty in Gripe Street, London.

She met her husband-to-be, the Hon Claude Crabtree, in the Assembly Rooms, York, during her twenty-first birthday ball. After a whirlwind romance, they were married on 1 July 1969 in the gloomy village church of King Herod the Great on the Crabtree family estate at Cleghorn St Percy, North Yorkshire. The couple later had twin sons, Giles and Miles. When Claude's father (Montfort, 8th Baron Crabtree) died on 7 June 1977, at the age of 104, Claude inherited the Barony and Constance became Lady Crabtree. If he had died just a day earlier, Lady Crabtree would not have been deprived of a seat at the Queen's Silver Jubilee Service in St Paul's Cathedral and she harbours a suspicion that he lingered deliberately just to spite her.

As a fully-fledged member of the aristocracy, in 1978 her public life began in earnest, particularly in connection with Lord Crabtree's role as Chairman of the Mid-Yorkshire Swine Breeders' Federation - the Crabtrees owning some of the largest sites in Yorkshire. A highlight of her early married life was entertaining Queen Elizabeth II and the Duke of Edinburgh at a Swine Breeders' dinner at Crabtree Hall, which greatly improved Lady C's standing as a society hostess. Continuing her family's interest in the theatre (she had herself appeared as a chorus girl in her teenage years at York Theatre Royal) Lady Crabtree became Patron of the Cleghorn Local Amateur Players (The CLAP), a role she still endures to this day.

After Claude's death in 1984 (Face down in the bombe-surprise at a dinner party.) and left with astronomical death duties plus her husband's gambling debts, the Dowager Lady Crabtree found herself financially embarrassed. Taking pity on her situation, the Queen offered her the post of Relief-Woman of the Bedchamber within the Royal Household. After publishing extracts from the Queen's diaries and letters in the misguided belief that she was doing Her Majesty a favour, Lady Crabtree unexpectedly found that her services were no longer required.

Lady Crabtree continues to fulfill an active public life currently residing in Eastbourne, making frequent personal appearances such as hosting functions and speaking at many yearly ladies' events. With humour suited to the over-fifties, her current talks include "How To Grow Old Disgracefully", "Glad To Be Grey" and "You're Never Too Old".

Since 2019 Lady Crabtree has been Patron of the Association of Carers.

Lady Crabtree 1978

Lady Crabtree 1988

Lady Crabtree 2009

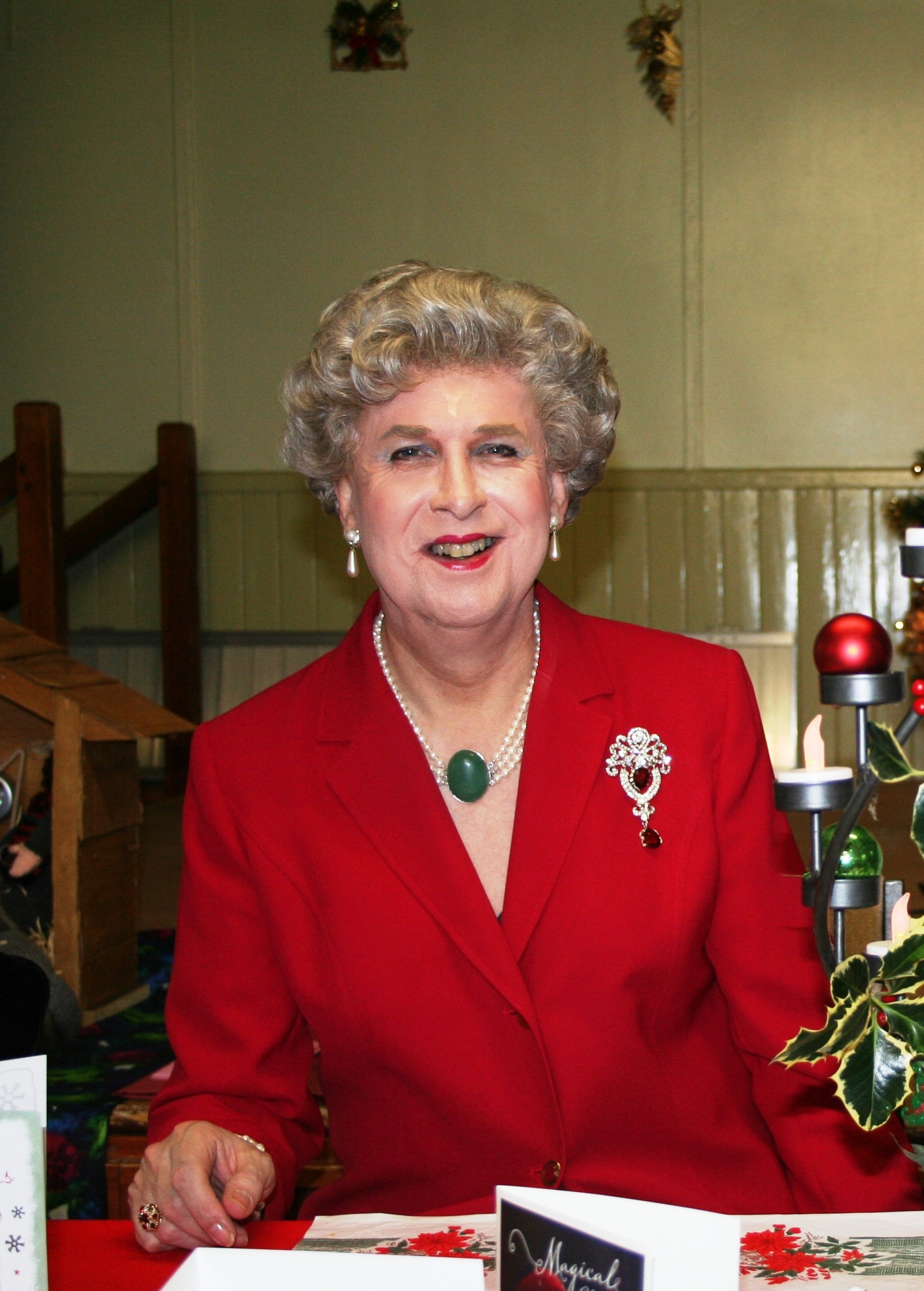
Lady Crabtree 2015

== Official style ==
Lady Crabtree is formally known as "Constance, Lady Crabtree", and in widowhood can also be referred to as "The Dowager Lady Crabtree". She should not be called "Lady Constance", and would only be addressed in this form had she been born the daughter of an Earl, a Marquess or a Duke.
