= Ted Scott Flying Stories =

Juvenile book series

Ted Scott Flying Stories (series)
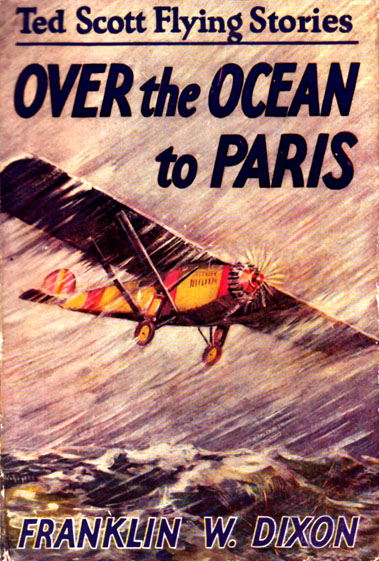
- Over the Ocean to Paris (1927)
- Author: Franklin W. Dixon
- Language: English
- Genre: Juvenile adventure
- Publisher: Grosset & Dunlap
- Publication date: 1927-1943
- Publication place: United States

The Ted Scott Flying Stories was a series of juvenile aviation adventures created by the Stratemeyer Syndicate using the pseudonym of Franklin W. Dixon (also used for The Hardy Boys) and published almost exclusively by Grosset & Dunlap. The novels were produced between 1927 and 1943. The principal author was John W. Duffield, who also contributed to the Don Sturdy and Bomba the Jungle Boy series. As "Richard H. Stone" he also launched a second Stratemeyer aviation series, the Slim Tyler Air stories (1930–1932). Duffield was a conscientious student of aeronautical technology, and long passages in the Ted Scott books can be traced to such sources as Aviation, the New York Times, Aero Digest, and Science.

The series featured Ted Scott, a public aviation hero rather than merely an amateur aviator. In the first book in the series, Over the Ocean to Paris published in 1927, Ted Scott achieved fame for being the first pilot to fly over the Atlantic Ocean to Paris, a feat first accomplished in the real world by Charles Lindbergh in May of that year.

For several years the Ted Scott adventures outsold The Hardy Boys mystery series, which also began in 1927 and were also credited to the pen name Franklin W. Dixon.

One book from the Ted Scott series appears to be the first Stratemeyer Syndicate book to be reprinted in a foreign country and language, in the first half of the 1930s. Cover and interior art are different from the G & D editions.

== List of titles ==
Cover of book and dust jacket from German edition. Some copies had gold lettering on book, vice black

1. Over the Ocean to Paris (1927)
2. First Stop Honolulu (1927)
3. Rescued in the Clouds (1927)
4. Over the Rockies with the Air Mail (1927)
5. The Search for the Lost Flyers (1928)
6. South of the Rio Grande (1928)
7. Across the Pacific (1928)
8. The Lone Eagle of the Border (1929)
9. Flying Against Time (1929)
10. Over The Jungle Trails (1929)
11. Lost at the South Pole (1930)
12. Through the Air to Alaska (1930)
13. Flying to the Rescue (1930)
14. Danger Trails of the Sky (1931)
15. Following the Sun Shadow (1932)
16. Battling the Wind (1933)
17. Brushing the Mountain Top (1934)
18. Castaways of the Stratosphere (1935)
19. Hunting the Sky Spies (1941)
20. The Pursuit Patrol (1943)

=== Re-vamp ===
1. Hunting the Sky Spies (1941) (as volume 19)
2. The Pursuit Patrol (1943) (as volume 20)
