= Saint-Constant =

Saint-Constant is the name of several places:

- Saint-Constant, Quebec, Canada
  - Saint-Constant station
- Saint-Constant, Cantal, France

== See also ==
- Saint Constant (died 777), Irish priest and hermit
- Saint Constantius
- Saint Constantine (disambiguation)
