= Ana P. Barros =

American civil and environmental engineer

- Title: Donald Biggar Willett Chair of Engineering and Department Head of Civil and Environmental Engineering

Academic background
- Education: OGI School of Science and Engineering
- Alma mater: University of Washington

Academic work
- Discipline: Engineering
- Sub-discipline: Civil engineering Environmental engineering
- Institutions: University of Illinois at Urbana-Champaign
- Notable works: Decoupling of erosion and precipitation in the Himalayas

Ana Paula Barros is an African-born American civil and environmental engineer currently the Donald Biggar Willett Chair of Engineering and Department Head of Civil and Environmental Engineering at the University of Illinois at Urbana-Champaign and an Elected Fellow of the American Association for the Advancement of Science and an Elected Fellow of the American Meteorological Society. In 2019 she was elected to the National Academy of Engineering for "contributions to understanding and prediction of precipitation dynamics and flood hazards in mountainous terrains". Prior to joining the University of Illinois, Professor Barros was the James L. Meriam Professor of Civil and Environmental Engineering at Duke University.

== Education ==
She earned her diploma in civil engineering at University of Porto in 1985 and an M.Sc. in ocean engineering in 1988 followed by her M.Sc. in Environmental Engineering at OGI School of Science and Engineering in 1990 and then Ph.D. in Civil and Environmental Engineering at University of Washington in 1993.

== Research ==
Her interests are hydrology and precipitation such as rainfall's effect on mountains and ground. Her highest cited paper is "Decoupling of erosion and precipitation in the Himalayas", which has been referenced over 500 times, according to Google Scholar.

== Publications ==
- Barros, AP; Hodes, JL; Arulraj, M, Decadal climate variability and the spatial organization of deep hydrological drought, Environmental Research Letters, vol 12 no. 10 (2017), pp. 104005–104005
- Arulraj, M; Barros, AP, Shallow Precipitation Detection and Classification Using Multifrequency Radar Observations and Model Simulations, Journal of Atmospheric and Oceanic Technology, vol 34 no. 9 (2017), pp. 1963–1983
- Understanding How Low-Level Clouds and Fog Modify the Diurnal Cycle of Orographic Precipitation Using In Situ and Satellite Observations, Remote Sensing, vol 9 no. 9 (2017), pp. 920–920
- Wilson, AM; Barros, AP, Orographic Land–Atmosphere Interactions and the Diurnal Cycle of Low-Level Clouds and Fog, Journal of Hydrometeorology, vol 18 no. 5 (2017), pp. 1513–1533
- Tao, J; Barros, AP, Multi-year atmospheric forcing datasets for hydrologic modeling in regions of complex terrain – Methodology and evaluation over the Integrated Precipitation and Hydrology Experiment 2014 domain, Journal of Hydrology (2017)
