= Constância (parish) =

- Civil parish
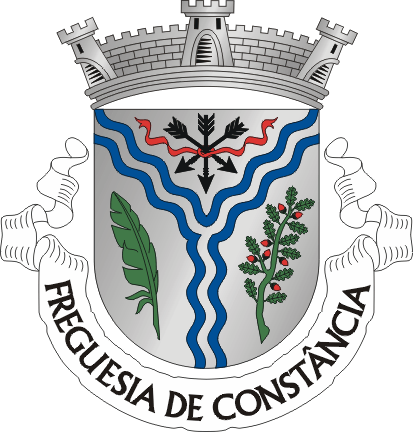
- Coat of arms

- Location in Portugal
- Coordinates: 39.477°N 8.339°W
- Country: Portugal
- Region: Oeste e Vale do Tejo
- Intermunic. comm.: Médio Tejo
- District: Santarém
- Municipality: Constância

Area
  - Total: 8.83 km^{2} (3.41 sq mi)

Population (2011)
  - Total: 993
  - Density: 112/km^{2} (291/sq mi)
- Time zone: UTC+00:00 (WET)
  - Summer (DST): UTC+01:00 (WEST)

Constância is a parish (freguesia) in the municipality of Constância in Portugal. The population in 2011 was 993, in an area of 8.83 km^{2} (3.41 sq mi). It was originally named Punhete.
