= Constance (video game) =

2025 video game

- Developer: btf Games
- Publishers: btf Games; ByteRockers' Games; Parco Games
- Composer: Tiago Rodrigues
- Platforms: Windows; Nintendo Switch; PlayStation 5; Xbox Series X/S; Nintendo Switch 2
- Release: Windows; November 24, 2025; Switch, PS5, Xbox Series X/S; May 1, 2026; Switch 2; July 30, 2026
- Genres: Metroidvania, action
- Mode: Single-player

Constance is a metroidvania action video game developed and published by German studio btf Games together with ByteRockers' Games and Parco Games. It was first released for Windows on Steam on November 24, 2025. Then it received ports for Nintendo Switch, PlayStation 5, and Xbox Series X/S on May 1, 2026, and then later for Nintendo Switch 2 on July 30, 2026.

== Gameplay ==
The player controls the titular heroine and explores six different areas of the game world. Movement primarily consists of jumping, dashing, and bouncing, as the character spends much time unconnected to the ground. The player can attack with their only weapon, a brush, and can use abilities which cost paint points that can be quickly restored by standing on the ground. If all paint is used, the player can continue using abilities at the cost of health. If the player dies, they can choose between respawning at the last checkpoint or immediately respawning at the place of death, at the cost of strengthening the enemies until the player rests at a checkpoint.

== Plot ==
The story follows the eponymous Constance, an artist and digital creative who is struggling to cope with the stresses of life and is transported into the world of her own mind. Her mental health is slowly declining, as the world is decaying on its own and each object in it represents ideas, memories, and emotions of the character.

== Reception ==
Reception

Aggregate scores
Aggregator	Score
Metacritic	(PC) 81/100
OpenCritic	97% recommend (Note: Based on 39 reviews)

Review scores
Publication	Score
GameSpot	7/10
GamesRadar+	4/5
Shacknews	9/10

Constance received generally favorable reviews from critics, according to the review aggregation website Metacritic. Fellow review aggregator OpenCritic assessed that the game received strong approval, being recommended by 97% of critics.

The game is often compared to Hollow Knight and Hollow Knight: Silksong. Reviewers also highlighted the unique art style and entertaining boss battles. Constance was named "good" compared to other "all five million (-ish) metroidvanias" by PC Gamer.
