= Constance Rover =

English historian (1910–2005)

- Born: 15 December 1910; Cumbria, England, United Kingdom
- Died: 16 February 2005 (aged 94); England, United Kingdom
- Citizenship: United Kingdom
- Occupation: Historian
- Years active: 1954–1990
- Employers: Workers' Educational Association; Polytechnic of North London
- Spouse: Frederick Rover
- Children: 1

Constance Rover (15 December 1910 – 16 February 2005) was an English historian. She educated on behalf of the Workers' Educational Association and became a full-time faculty member of the Polytechnic of North London as deputy head of law and sociology law department in 1957. Rover began England's first women's studies course in the early 1960s and wrote the books Women's Suffrage and Party Politics in Britain 1866–1914 and Punch Book Of Women's Rights in 1967. She retired in 1971, a year after publishing Love, Morals And The Feminists. Rover was a member of the International Alliance of Women board and published Rambling Rhymes in 1990.

== Biography ==
On 15 December 1910, Rover was born in Cumbria, England. She was the sole child of an invalid father. Rover was educated at Cockermouth Grammar School and went on to work as a secretary in Leeds and later Bradford. Following her getting married and becoming a mother, she remained at home but did gain outside interests. Rover became a member of the Townswomen's Guild following her 1954 relocation to Beckenham in Kent. She studied an external degree in economics under family policy and single parenthood specialist OR McGregor at the University of London. Following graduation, Rover educated on behalf of the Workers' Educational Association, before going on to join the Polytechnic of North London in Kentish Town as a full-time faculty member in 1957, becoming deputy head of law and sociology law department.

She was also a senior government lecturer and began the first women's studies course in England for part-time students who had no formal qualifications in the early 1960s; the course quickly became over-subscribed. Rover also got her Doctor of Philosophy and wrote a book on suffrage researching in the British Library and the Fawcett Society archives. The book, Women's Suffrage and Party Politics in Britain 1866–1914, was published by her in 1967. That same year, Punch Book Of Women's Rights, was prepared historically by the author and included cartoons, stories and verses that were featured in the British magazine Punch.

When the second wave of feminism came to emerge, Rover authored Love, Morals And The Feminists in 1970. She wrote about a global account of women's rights' struggles, that made up the first wave of feminism from well known figures such as Annie Besant, Josephine Butler, Emmeline Pankhurst and Marie Stopes. In 1971, Rover retired hesitantly and relocated to Hythe, Kent from Highgate. She studied French and German, playing bridge and reading. Rover began travelling following the death of her husband and joined the International Alliance of Women's board. She attended the International Alliance of Women's meetings held in Australia, Finland, Iceland and Japan and became friends with women from several backgrounds. Rover published Rambling Rhymes in 1990.

== Personal life ==
She was married to the solicitor Frederick Rover, with whom she had a daughter who became a historian of prostitution law. Rover died on 16 February 2005.

== Approach ==
She said of her research into women's rights in a 1983 interview that it was to combine her interests in history, law and politics. Jan Marsh of The Guardian said of Rover's legacy: "Those schooled in the "personal is political" approach will see how this silently informed her work, and how, through the resolutely impersonal scholarship demanded of her generation, she opened a door through which historians poured, often only half-aware of their predecessors."
