= Constance (magazine) =

Constance is an annual arts and literature journal based in New Orleans, Louisiana, founded in 2006 by graphic designer Erik Kiesewetter and writer/editor Patrick Strange, who is also the ex-managing editor of Los Angeles–based Filter. Exploring the "fragmentary life that is New Orleans," Constance publishes many forms of visual art and creative writing with a focus on New Orleans and the ongoing crisis following Hurricane Katrina.

== About the magazine ==
The magazine is named Constance after the street in New Orleans where Kiesewetter lived before Hurricane Katrina. It also refers to the resilience of those who live in New Orleans, and the spirit of art. The magazine features a wide range of art, including painting, writing, illustration, graphic design, graffiti, poetry, sculpture, photography and collage. Accompanying each artwork is the artist's mini-biography, which includes their location pre-Hurricane Katrina, their current location, and their contact details.

Proceeds from the sale of the magazine go towards printing costs and the cost of developing future volumes.

== Issues ==
The first issue, "Replicas and Replacements", was published in December 2006 and featured 40 New Orleans artists and writers in a 96-page color publication. The issue had a limited run of 1,000 hand-numbered copies and included works by Christopher Chambers, editor of the New Orleans Review, Michael Patrick Welch, author of the novel The Donkey Show, and Samia Saleem, editor and creator of Degrees of Separation.

The second issue of Constance, entitled "Delicate Burdens", was published on February 15, 2008. "Delicate Burdens" contains the work of over 45 New Orleans–based writers and artists, including Lee Crum, Frank Relle, Bud Faust, Andy Young, and Tim Best.
