= X Bar X Boys =

Children's novel series

The X Bar X Boys was a series of western adventures for boys created by the Stratemeyer Syndicate and written under the pseudonym of James Cody Ferris and published by Grosset & Dunlap. At first, a total of 2 or 3 volumes were published per year, but in 1930, it slowed to 1 book per year. In 1942, the series was discontinued.

Leslie McFarlane, author of many Hardy Boys stories, contributed to this series as well.

The Manley Boys, Roy and Teddy, are the sons of an old ranchman, the owner of many thousands of head of cattle. The lads know how to ride, how to shoot, and how to take care of themselves under any and all circumstances.

The cowboys of the X Bar X ranch are real cowboys, on the job when required but full of fun and daring—a bunch any reader will be delighted to know.

== List Of Titles ==
#	Title	Copyright
1	The X Bar X Boys On The Ranch	1926
2	The X Bar X Boys In Thunder Canyon	1926
3	The X Bar X Boys On Whirlpool River	1926
4	The X Bar X Boys On Big Bison Trail	1927
5	The X Bar X Boys At The Round-Up	1927
6	The X Bar X Boys At Nugget Camp	1928
7	The X Bar X Boys At Rustlers' Gap	1928
8	The X Bar X Boys At Grizzly Pass	1929
9	The X Bar X Boys Lost In The Rockies	1930
10	The X Bar X Boys Riding For Life	1931
11	The X Bar X Boys In Smoky Valley	1932
12	The X Bar X Boys At Copperhead Gulch	1933
13	The X Bar X Boys Branding The Wild Herd	1934
14	The X Bar X Boys At The Strange Rodeo	1935
15	The X Bar X Boys With The Secret Rangers	1936
16	The X Bar X Boys Hunting The Prize Mustangs	1937
17	The X Bar X Boys At Triangle Mine	1938
18	The X Bar X Boys And The Sagebrush Mystery	1939
19	The X Bar X Boys In The Haunted Gully	1940
20	The X Bar X Boys Seeking The Lost Troopers	1941
21	The X Bar X Boys Following The Stampede	1942
