= Constância =

- Municipality
- Notable Town of Constância
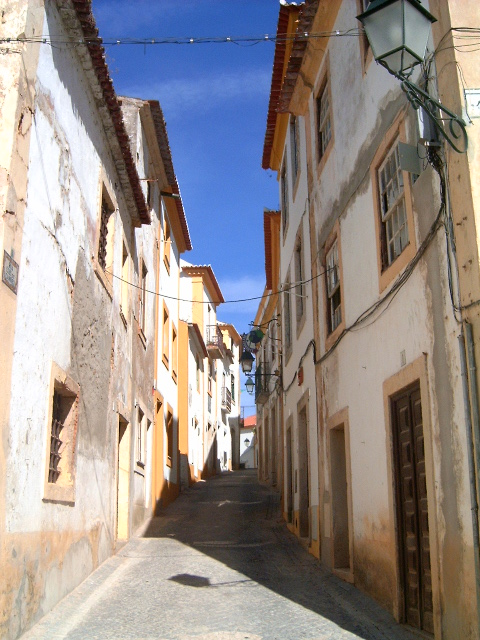
- View of Constância

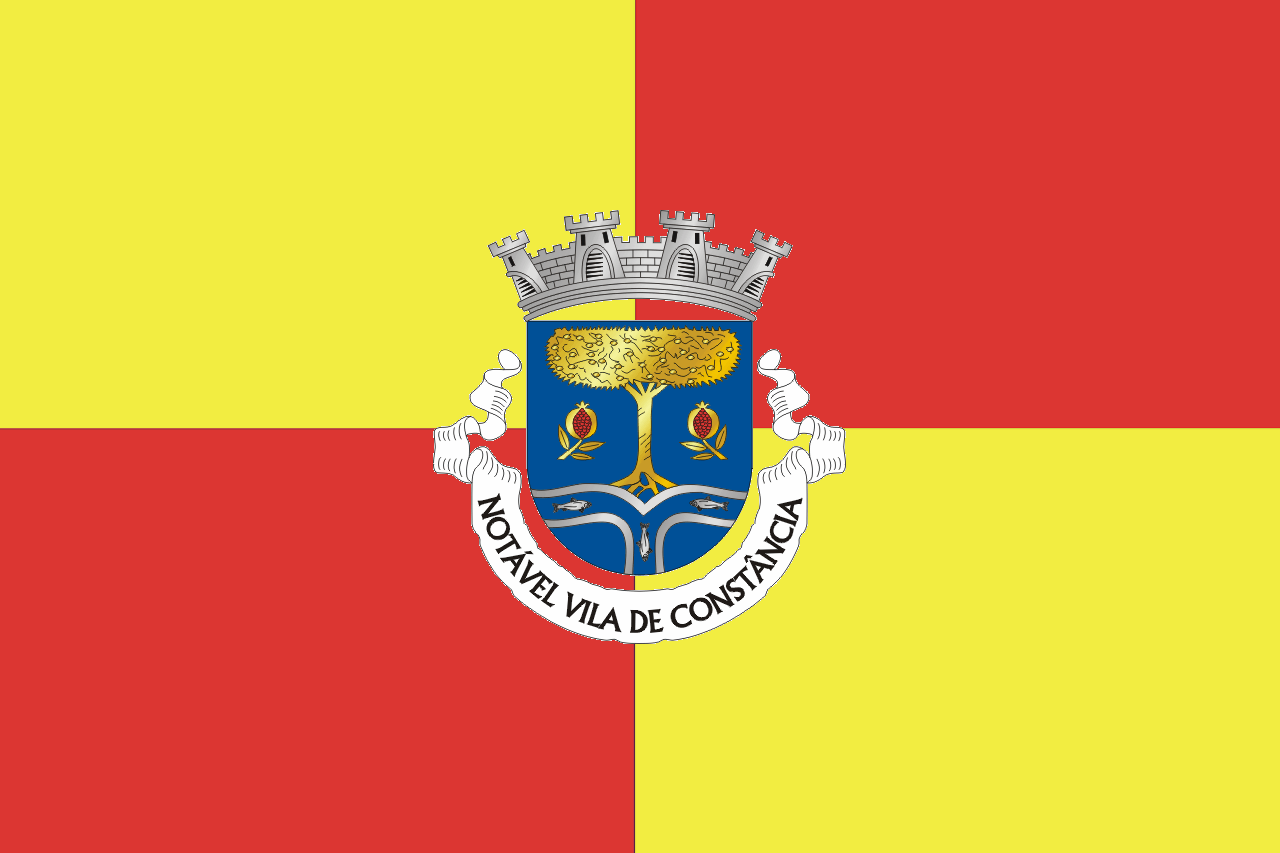
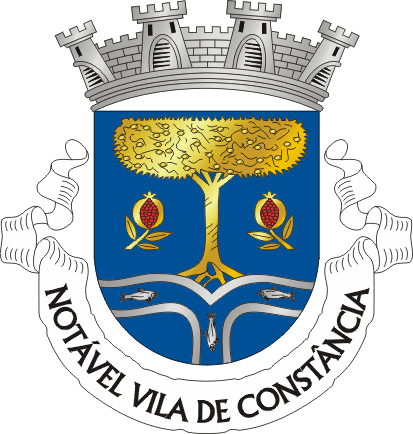
- Flag Coat of arms
- Interactive map of Constância
- Location in Portugal
- Coordinates: 39°21′N 8°29′W
- Country: Portugal
- Region: Oeste e Vale do Tejo
- Intermunic. comm.: Médio Tejo
- District: Santarém
- Parishes: 3

Government
  - President: António Mendes (CDU)

Area
  - Total: 80.37 km^{2} (31.03 sq mi)

Population (2011)
  - Total: 4,056
  - Density: 50.47/km^{2} (130.7/sq mi)
- Time zone: UTC+00:00 (WET)
  - Summer (DST): UTC+01:00 (WEST)
- Local holiday: Easter Monday (date varies)
- Website: http://www.cm-constancia.pt

Constância, (Note: Portuguese pronunciation: [kõʃˈtɐ̃siɐ]) officially the Notable Town of Constância, previously known as Punhete, is a municipality in Santarém District in Portugal. The population in 2011 was 4,056, in an area of 80.37 km^{2}.

Conquered from the Moors in 1150, it was given the status of 'town' in 1571 through a charter from King Sebastian. Portuguese national poet Luís de Camões lived in exile there between 1548 and 1550. In 1809, the English army met in Constância before marching on Spain, on their way to the Battle of Talavera, where Wellington defeated the French.

== Parishes ==
Administratively, the municipality is divided into 3 civil parishes (freguesias):

- Constância
- Montalvo
- Santa Margarida da Coutada

== Notable people ==
- Tomaz Vieira da Cruz (1900 in Constância – 1960 in Lisbon) a poet, musician and journalist.
