= Connie Blair =

Fictional character

- Original cover, volume 3
- Author: Betty Cavanna
- Publisher: Grosset & Dunlap
- Published: 1948 to 1958

Connie Blair is the central character in a series of 12 mystery novels for adolescent girls written by Betsy Allen and published by Grosset & Dunlap between 1948 and 1958.

The Connie Blair series has been criticized for its sexism. As critic Bobbie Ann Mason writes, "[t]he series stresses appearance, popularity, and femininity as I.D. card for entry into the business world". Mason cites several moments from the series in which Connie uses sex appeal, rather than investigative prowess, to achieve her goals.

== List of titles ==
1. The Clue in Blue (1948)
2. The Riddle in Red (1948)
3. Puzzle in Purple (1948)
4. The Secret of Black Cat Gulch (1948)
5. The Green Island Mystery (1949)
6. The Ghost Wore White (1950)
7. The Yellow Warning (1951)
8. The Gray Menace (1953)
9. The Brown Satchel Mystery (1954)
10. Peril in Pink (1955)
11. The Silver Secret (1956)
12. The Mystery of the Ruby Queens (1958)
