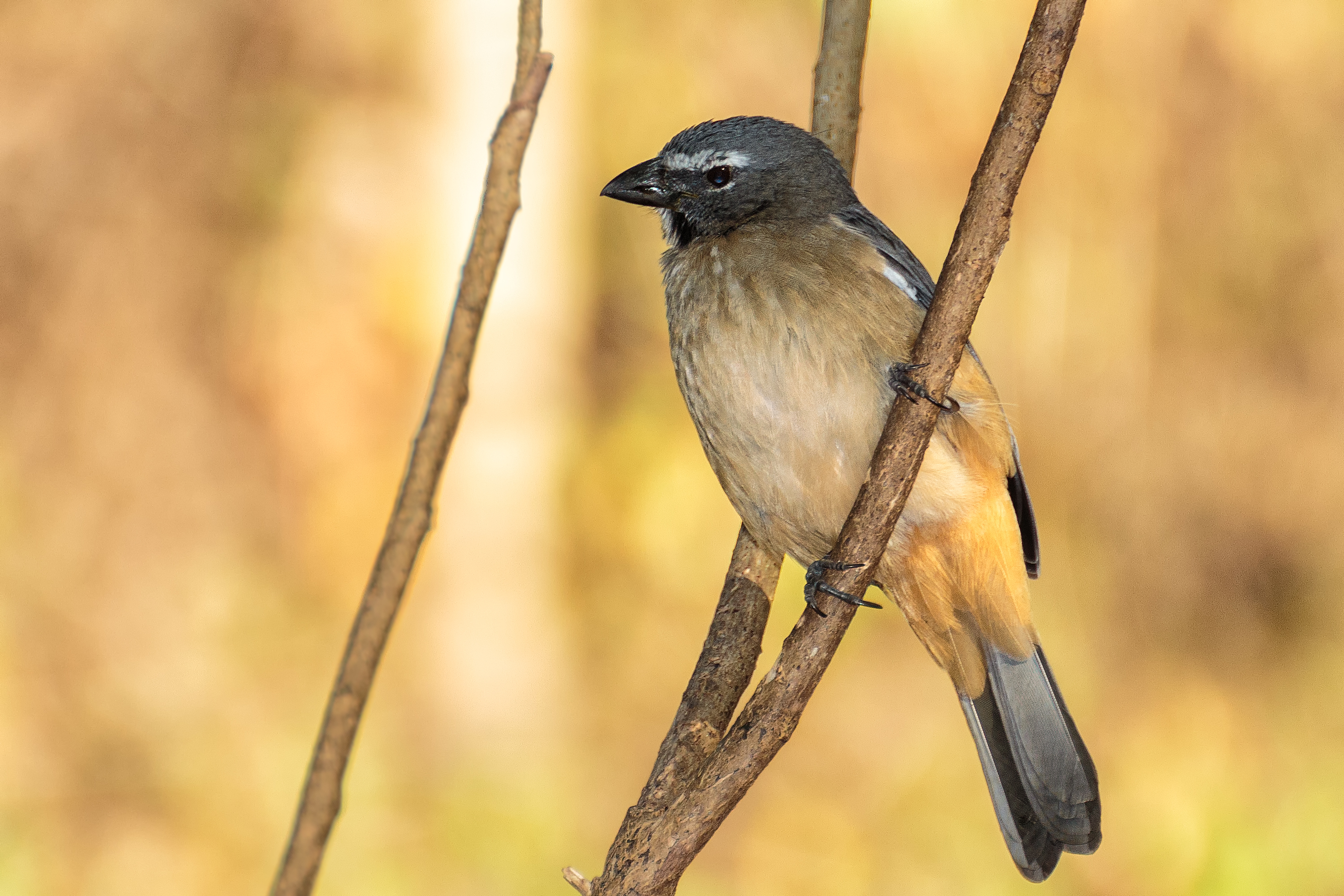
- In Caracas, Venezuela

Conservation status
- Least Concern (IUCN 3.1)

Scientific classification
- Domain: Eukaryota
- Kingdom: Animalia
- Phylum: Chordata
- Class: Aves
- Order: Passeriformes
- Family: Thraupidae
- Genus: Saltator
- Species: S. olivascens

Binomial name
- Saltator olivascens Cabanis, 1849
- Range in green

= Olive-grey saltator =

Species of bird

The olive-grey saltator (Saltator olivascens), also known as the Caribbean grey saltator, is a quiet, grey-colored passerine bird in the tanager family Thraupidae, native to Colombia, Venezuela, the Guianas, far northern Brazil, and Trinidad. It was formerly considered conspecific with the greyish saltator (Saltator coerulescens), but was split as a distinct species by the IOC in 2021. The olive-grey saltator includes the subspecies brewsteri and plumbeus.

== Taxonomy ==
Previously grouped with the bluish-grey Saltator (Saltator coerulescens) and cinnamon-bellied saltator (Saltator grandis) into one species, the greyish saltator, the olive-grey saltator (Saltator olivascens) was split in 2021 by the IOC on the basis of vocal and genetic differences, as well as the fact that the three occupy different ranges.

This species includes three subspecies, ssp. olivascens, plumbeus, and brewsteri.

== Description ==
The olive-grey saltator has a thick, black bill that is slightly hooked at the end, with white supercilliaries (giving it a distinct white "eyebrow"), and a thin white crescent under its eye. Distinct black malar stripes frame either side of a white throat. Its underside is a light grey with some buffy coloration towards its flanks and undertail coverts. Despite its name, it is only slightly olive-colored, with a primarily dark grey back, which distinguishes it from the closely related and similar-looking buff-throated saltator (Saltator maximus) and streaked saltator (Saltator striatipectus) which have clearly olive (and not grey) backs. Both sexes look similar, while juveniles are washed olive and yellow rather than grey, particularly on their undersides.

== Distribution ==
The species spans most of northern South America, ranging from northeastern Colombia through Venezuela and the Guianas, into extreme northern Brazil, and can also be found in Trinidad. The subspecies each occupy different ranges within this, with the olivascens subspecies found in the Tepuis of southern Venezuela, to the Guianas, Suriname, and adjacent northern Brazil, the plumbeus subspecies along the Caribbean coast of northern Colombia (from Río Sinú to Magdalena Valley), and the brewsteri subspecies in tropical northeast Colombia to Venezuela, and on the island of Trinidad. The olive-grey saltator is a resident species, and does not migrate.

== Habitat ==
These birds are frequently found in a variety of edge habitats including forest edges, shrublands, inland wetlands, and second growth forests. They also do quite well in human-modified habitats, such as orchards, gardens, cleared areas, and near homes. They have also been observed in parks and botanical gardens in an urban metropolitan area in northern Colombia, demonstrating their ability to succeed in certain anthropogenic environments.

== Behaviour ==
=== Behaviour ===
Olive-grey saltators have a low-energy lifestyle, spending little time on high-energy activities and instead devoting most of their time to resting, singing or preening. They are diurnal birds, and can often be found singing from the canopy, though they forage at all levels.

=== Diet ===
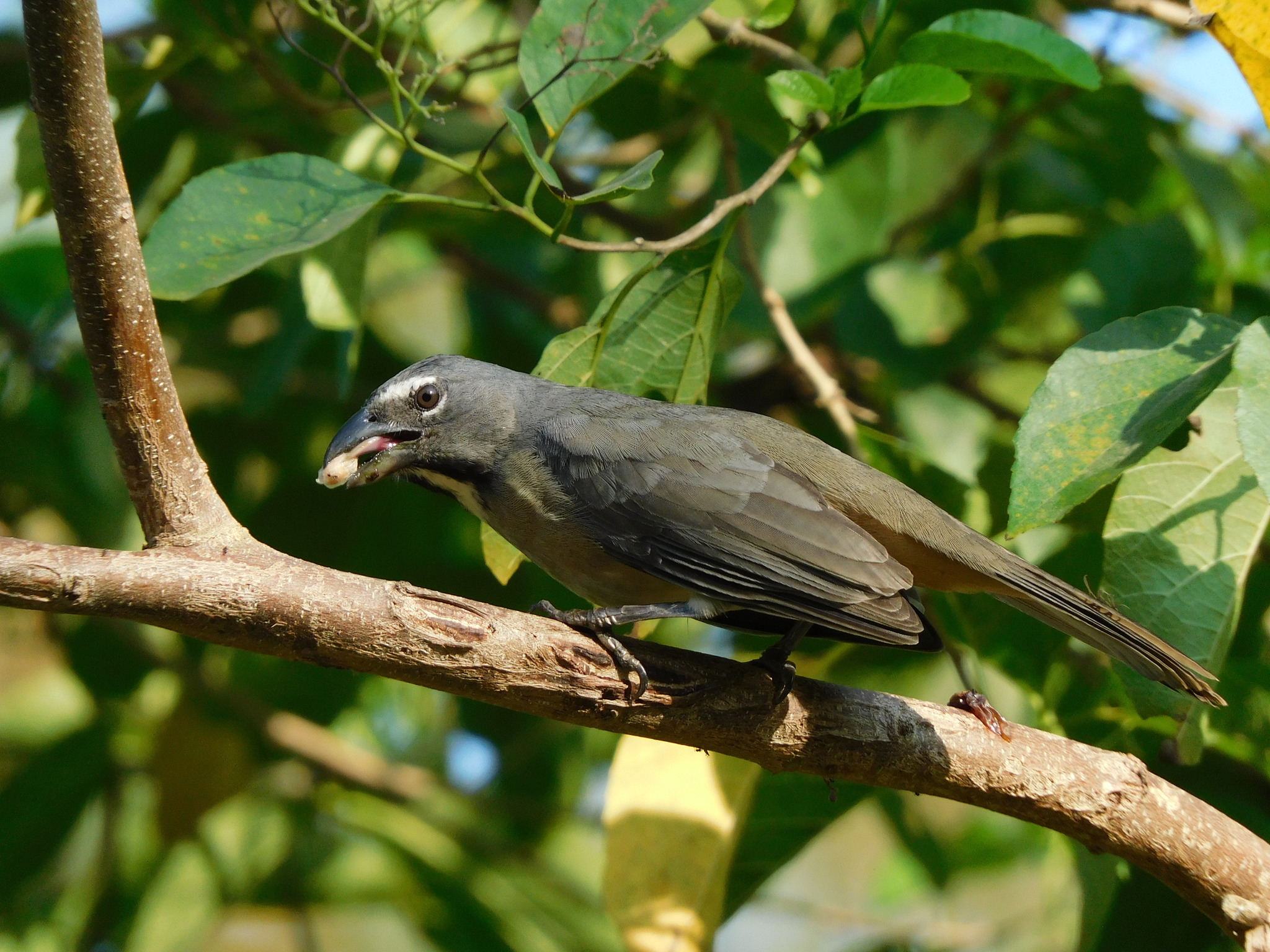
An olive-grey saltator in Lorica, Córdoba, Colombia, foraging for berries.

Olive-grey saltators are frugivorous birds, eating plant matter of all kinds. Fruits and leaves make up about 64% of their diet, but they have been observed eating flower buds, tendrils, seed pods, and flowers. They feed their chicks high-protein insects, and will occasionally consume them as adults in the dry season, when vegetation is scarcer.

They have a preference for fruits and more tender vegetation (which contain more protein and nutrients), particularly morning glory flowers, but will consume mature leaves when other food is not readily available. It was found that these birds spend little time foraging, and instead eat as much as they can and process it quickly, which allows them to get the necessary nutrients from foods that are high in fiber and otherwise difficult to digest.

=== Reproduction ===
They first reproduce at 1 year and live about 3.8 years, the maximum age being 9 years. Olive-grey saltators nest in dense vegetation, building a bulky, open-cup nest of dead plant material (and at times, man-made materials like paper), with finer material such as grasses and thin stems forming the lining. Not much is known about the nesting details of this species, but they appear to lay a clutch of 2-3 light-blue/turquoise eggs with black scrawls, which are smooth-shelled and oval-shaped.

=== Vocalizations ===
Described as having "a 'stuttering song' with rather harsh-sounding downslurred notes", they alternate high and low pitched notes to form a short but sweet melody that can be heard throughout the year. Both males and females sing, at times duetting in "a fast series of repeated rising whit notes, a series of overslurred low-pitched chup notes or loosely repeated high-pitched tseet notes." Their call is a short, high pitched "tseet!" which can be heard during song as well.

== Conservation status ==
Listed as least concern by the IUCN, olive-grey saltators are found throughout their range, common even in areas modified by humans.
