= Distraction display =

Distraction of a predator to protect one's young

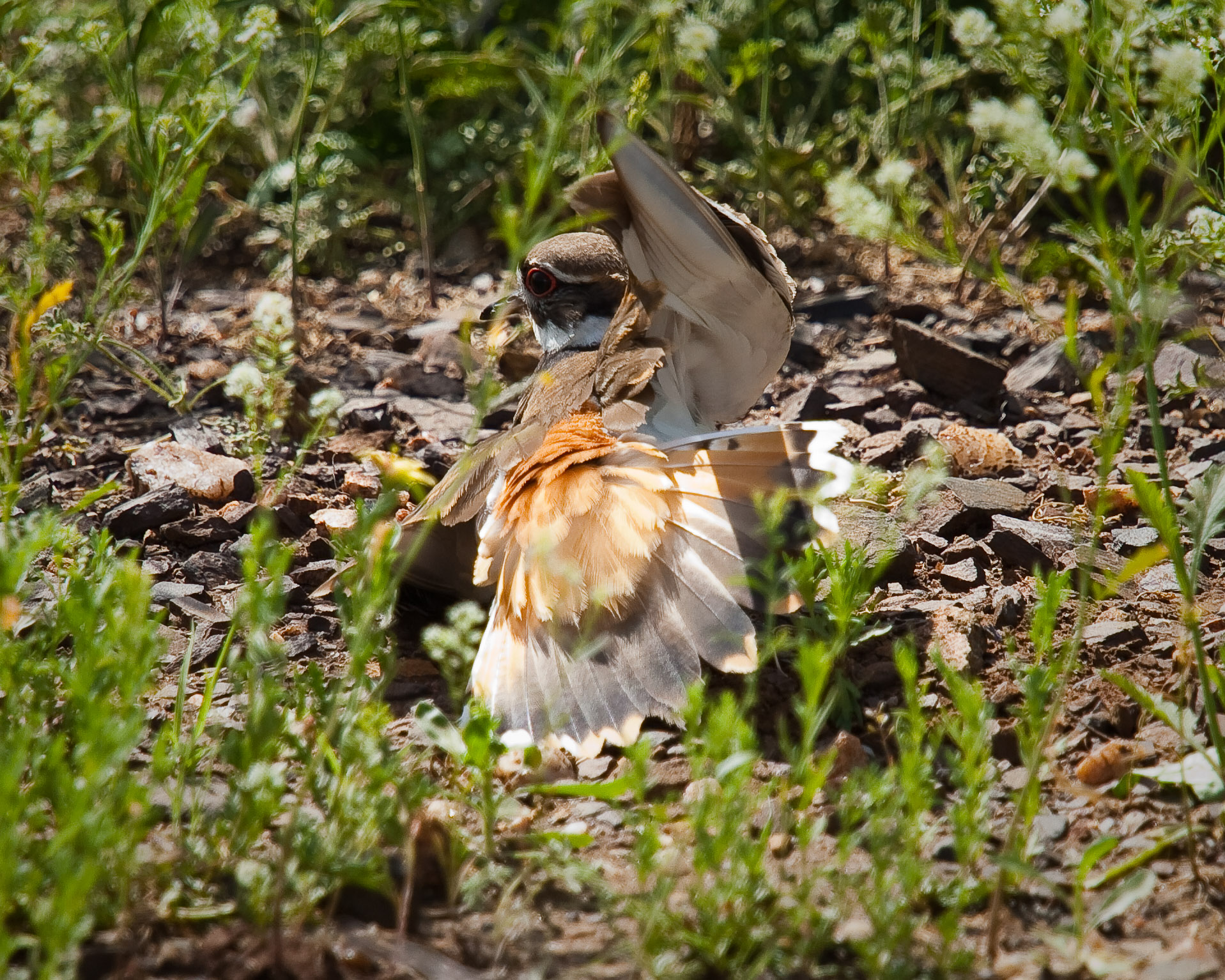
Killdeer feigning a broken wing

Distraction displays, also known as diversionary displays, or paratrepsis are anti-predator behaviors used to attract the attention of an enemy away from something, typically the nest or young, that is being protected by a parent. Distraction displays are sometimes classified more generically under "nest protection behaviors" along with aggressive displays such as mobbing. These displays have been studied most extensively in bird species, but also have been documented in populations of stickleback fish and in some mammal species.

Distraction displays frequently take the form of injury-feigning. However, animals may also imitate the behavior of a small rodent or alternative prey item for the predator; imitate young or nesting behaviors such as brooding (to cause confusion as to the true location of the nest), mimic foraging behaviors away from the nest, or simply draw attention to oneself.

== Evolution ==
=== Origin ===
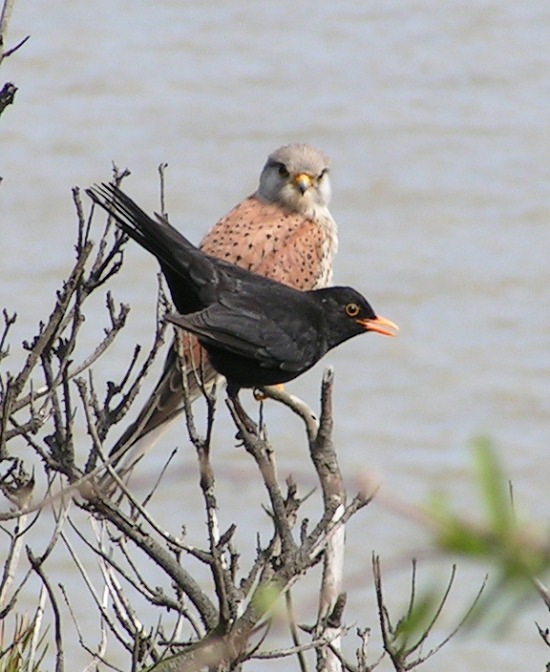
A male common blackbird (Turdus merula) attempting to distract a common kestrel (Falco tinnunculus) close to the blackbird's nest.

The behaviour was first described by Aristotle in his History of Animals.

David Lack postulated that distraction displays simply resulted from the bird's alarm at having been flushed from the nest and had no decoy purpose. He noted a case in the European nightjar, when a bird led him around the nest several times but made no attempt to lure him away. He additionally noted courtship displays mixed with the distraction displays of the bird, suggesting that distraction display is not a purposeful action unto itself, and observed that the display became less vigorous the more frequently he visited the nest, as would be expected if the display were a response driven by fear and surprise.

Other researchers, including Edward Allworthy Armstrong, have taken issue with these arguments. While Armstrong acknowledged that displaying animals could make mistakes, as Lack's nightjar seems to have done in leading him around the nest, he attributed such mistakes not to paralytic fear but to a conflict of interest between self-preservation and reproductive or enemy attack impulses: the bird at once experiences a drive to lure the predator away and also to directly guard the young. Armstrong also thought that the incorporation of sexual and threat displays into the distraction display did not necessarily represent a mistake on the part of the animal, but "might make the display more effective by increasing its conspicuousness". Finally, the observation of less vigorous displays due to repeated nest approaches does not preclude the parent animal simply learning that the human is not a threat to its young. Jeffrey Walters provided evidence that lapwings possessed the ability to distinguish between different types of predators of varying threat levels, a behavior which is presumably learned, perhaps through cultural transmission.

Armstrong additionally noted that displaying animals were rarely captured by predators, as would be expected if the display were truly uncontrolled, and that the movements seemed to show signs of some sort of control by the animal, although likely not conscious, intelligent control. One example of apparent control is attention seemingly paid to routes used by the displaying animal when moving away from the nest. Furthermore, researchers have noted parent animals moving towards the predator during the display. While some of these cases could be attributed to mistakes made during "partial paralysis", in the case described by Wiklund and Stigh, snowy owls consistently walked or ran towards the predator while displaying, suggesting that the action was deliberate.

An additional hypothesis in alignment with Armstrong's ideas about conflicting impulses suggests that the incorporation of sexual and threat displays into the distraction display may represent displacement. Displacement occurs when an animal, unable to satisfy two conflicting impulses, may initiate an out-of-context behavior to "vent". If a displacement behavior served an adaptive function, such as increased survival of the young, then it may have experienced positive selection and become ritualized and stereotyped in its new context.

In any case, there are some forms of distraction display which may in fact have evolved from stress responses, an idea more in alignment with Lack's hypothesis. One of these is the "rodent-run" display, in which a bird fluffs its feathers to mimic the fur of a rodent and scurries away from the nest. It is possible that this display originates from a feather ruffling reflex to alarm.

=== Adaptive functions ===
There are several conditions in which distraction display may be advantageous to the animal, such that the incorporation of displacement or stress behaviors into offspring defense will most likely undergo positive selection. Most such cases depend upon the condition or location of the nest: distraction display has tended to evolve in species whose nests alone do not provide a substantial physical barrier to predators, and in those that nest on exposed terrain or close to the ground. If the nest is on open terrain, the parent may perceive predators at a greater distance and be able to leave the nest and begin displaying before the predator is in sufficient proximity to locate the nest. Ground-nesting birds employ different defensive behaviors as part of their antipredator strategies because they nest where a wide range of predators have access.

It has been shown that for Kentish plovers there is a positive correlation between male and female defense behaviors within pairs and that nests in which parents invested more on defense survived longer. Furthermore, if the nest is on or near the ground, the parent may be able to display more effectively; Armstrong noted the relative rarity in the literature of distraction display in arboreal-nesting species, and attributed this to the difficulty of displaying convincingly while on a branch. Nonetheless, there have been anecdotal reports of warblers, which nest arboreally, dropping to the ground to perform a distraction display when disturbed, as well as displaying along a tree branch. In addition, distraction display tends to be most adaptive when animals nest solitarily, as solitary nesters lack the opportunity for mobbing a predator or otherwise performing communal defense, although some species have been observed to display in groups. Finally, distraction display tends to be adaptive when diurnal predation by visually-stimulated predators takes place (as these predators are most likely to notice the visual display).

== In birds ==
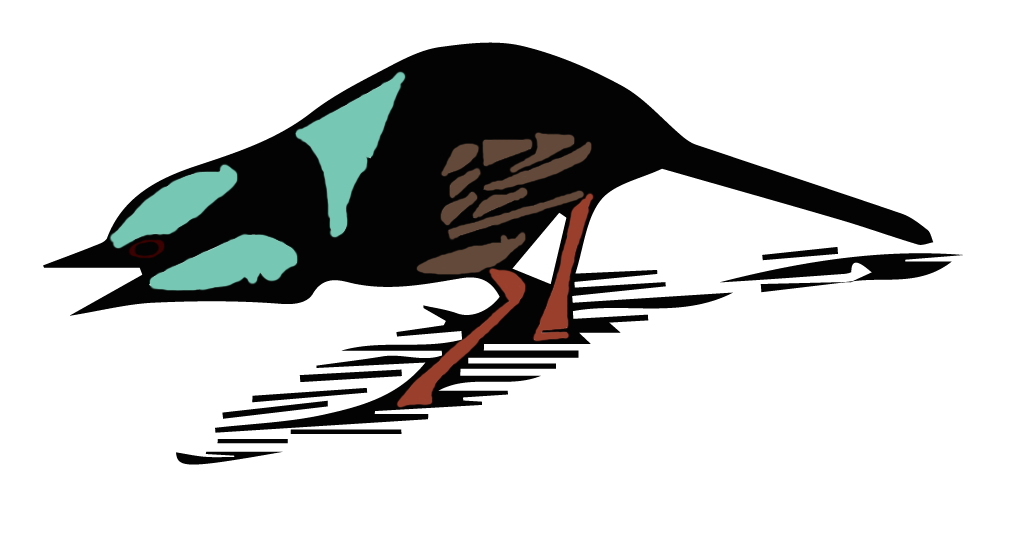
Rodent-run distraction display by superb blue wren (redrawn from Rowley, 1962)

Distraction display has been most extensively studied in birds. It has been observed in many species, including passerines and non-passerines, and has been particularly well documented in the Charadriiformes.

Injury-feigning, including broken-wing and impeded flight displays, is one of the more common forms of distraction, simulating a wing injury. In broken-wing displays, birds that are at the nest walk away from it with wings quivering so as to appear as an easy target for a predator. Such injury-feigning displays are particularly well known in nesting waders and plovers, but also have been documented in other species, including snowy owls, the alpine accentor, and the mourning dove. Impeded flight displays additionally may suggest an injured wing, but through an airborne display.

False brooding is an approach used by plovers. The bird moves away from the nest site and crouches on the ground so as to appear to be sitting at a nonexistent nest and allows the predator to approach closely before escaping. Another display seen in plovers, as well as some passerine birds, is the rodent run, in which the nesting bird ruffles its back feathers, crouches, and runs away from the predator. This display resembles the flight response of a small rodent.

It has additionally been postulated that threat displays, such as gaping by the Caprimulgidae and wing-extension by the killdeer, and sexual displays, such as courtship dancing by stilts, can become incorporated into distraction displays where the bird is feigning injury. In both cases the incorporated components may increase conspicuousness, resulting in a more effective distraction display.

== In fish ==
Stickleback fish have been documented performing distraction displays. A nesting male three-spined stickleback, when approached by a group of conspecifics, will perform a distraction display by digging or pointing into the substrate away from the nest in order to protect his eggs from cannibalism. There have been two explanations proposed for this behavior. One hypothesis is that the display arose from a courtship behavior in which the male normally "points" an approaching female towards his nest so that she may lay her eggs within it. Therefore, pointing at the sediment away from a nest containing eggs may divert a cannibalistic female's attention through sexual cues. A second hypothesis is that the stickleback distraction display arose from displaced foraging behavior and as such represents faux-foraging. In support of this hypothesis was the finding that all-male, all-female, and mixed foraging groups responded equally to the display, which would not be expected if it were indeed mimicking a sexual display.

== In mammals ==
Though rarely documented in mammals, a few instances of distraction display have appeared in the literature. One researcher documented a distraction display performed by a female red squirrel in order to protect her young. When the nest was approached, the female attempted to lead the researcher away through the trees using a ventriloquistic call that resembled the cries of the young. An additional study documented distraction display in Mentawai langurs, whereby a male will call loudly and bounce on branches while the female and young are able to quietly hide.

== Costs and decision to display ==
=== Risks ===
While animals performing distraction displays are rarely documented as being killed, risks to the displaying animal do exist. One researcher observed and documented an instance in which a second predator became attracted to an animal already performing a distraction display. The displaying animal was killed by the second predator.

Additionally, it has been shown that some predators learn to recognize that distraction displays indicate a nearby nest. One study recorded a red fox that increased its searching behavior in response to the distraction display of a grouse and eventually found and killed the grouse nestlings.

=== Factors influencing decision ===
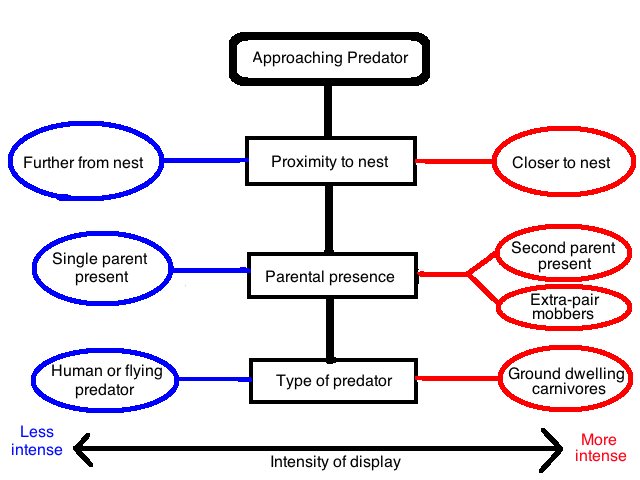
Factors influencing the decision to display when a predator approaches. Circles on the left represent circumstances that lead to lower intensity distraction displays, while circles on the right represent circumstances that lead to higher intensity distraction displays. Different combinations of these circles result in a spectrum of intensity of distraction displays.

Given these risks, an animal must decide when distraction display is an appropriate response to a predator. Researchers have found several important factors that appear to influence the decision to use a distraction display and the intensity of the display, although it is not evident that these factors are taken into consideration consciously by the displaying animal.

Several considerations involving the predator have been shown to be important, including the distance of the predator from the nest. Intensity of display has been shown to decrease as the distance of the predator from the nest increases, perhaps representing the balancing of risk to the displaying parent and to the vulnerable young. The type of predator has also been shown to be of importance, with birds tending to display most intensely to ground-dwelling carnivores and less intensely to humans and flying predators. Finally, the number of potential predators has also been shown to be important in sticklebacks, in which frequency of distraction displaying by the male is positively correlated with the number of conspecifics in a foraging shoal.

In addition, the presence of a second parent at the nest correlates with increased display intensity, perhaps representing a diluted predation risk. The number of potential extra-pair mobbers has also been shown to marginally increase the intensity of the display, again representing a possible dilution of risk to each of the animals engaging in the distraction.

Third, the timing of distraction display as a correlate of nestling age has been a matter of particular interest in birds, with study results showing that the age at which displays are performed differs in species with precocial and altricial young. In species with precocial young, distraction display is most frequent just after hatching, while in altricial young, it is most frequent just before fledging. This may represent a greater tendency to display at the times when parental investment in young is greatest, and the young are still very vulnerable. However, some studies have failed to find any correlation between the cost of replacing a brood (a measure of parental investment) and the frequency of distraction display.

Lastly, game theory has been employed to explain how grouse may decide to display or not based on proxies for the abundance of "smart" predators, such as abundance of rodents in the preceding year. In this particular study, it was assumed that a greater abundance of rodents in one year may result in higher birth rates among foxes, which feed on the rodents, and therefore a greater population of one-year-old foxes in the following year. Yearling foxes are not yet experienced enough grouse hunters to be considered "smart". As such, distraction display may be a profitable strategy for the grouse in years following rodent population booms, as there is less risk of encountering a "smart" predator. However, a low rodent population in a given year may result in lower birth rates among foxes for that year, thereby resulting in a higher proportion of older, more experienced foxes in the population in the following year. In such a case, grouse may profit from not displaying, as they are more likely to encounter a "smart" predator.

== See also ==
- Animal cognition
- Anti-predator adaptation
- Displacement
- Mobbing
- Sexual display
- Threat display
