= Greyish saltator =

Greyish saltator has been split into three species:

- Bluish-grey saltator or Amazonian grey saltator (Saltator coerulescens) – tropical and subtropical South America
- Cinnamon-bellied saltator or northern grey saltator (Saltator grandis) – Mexico and Central America
- Olive-grey saltator or Caribbean grey saltator (Saltator olivascens) – northern South America and Trinidad
