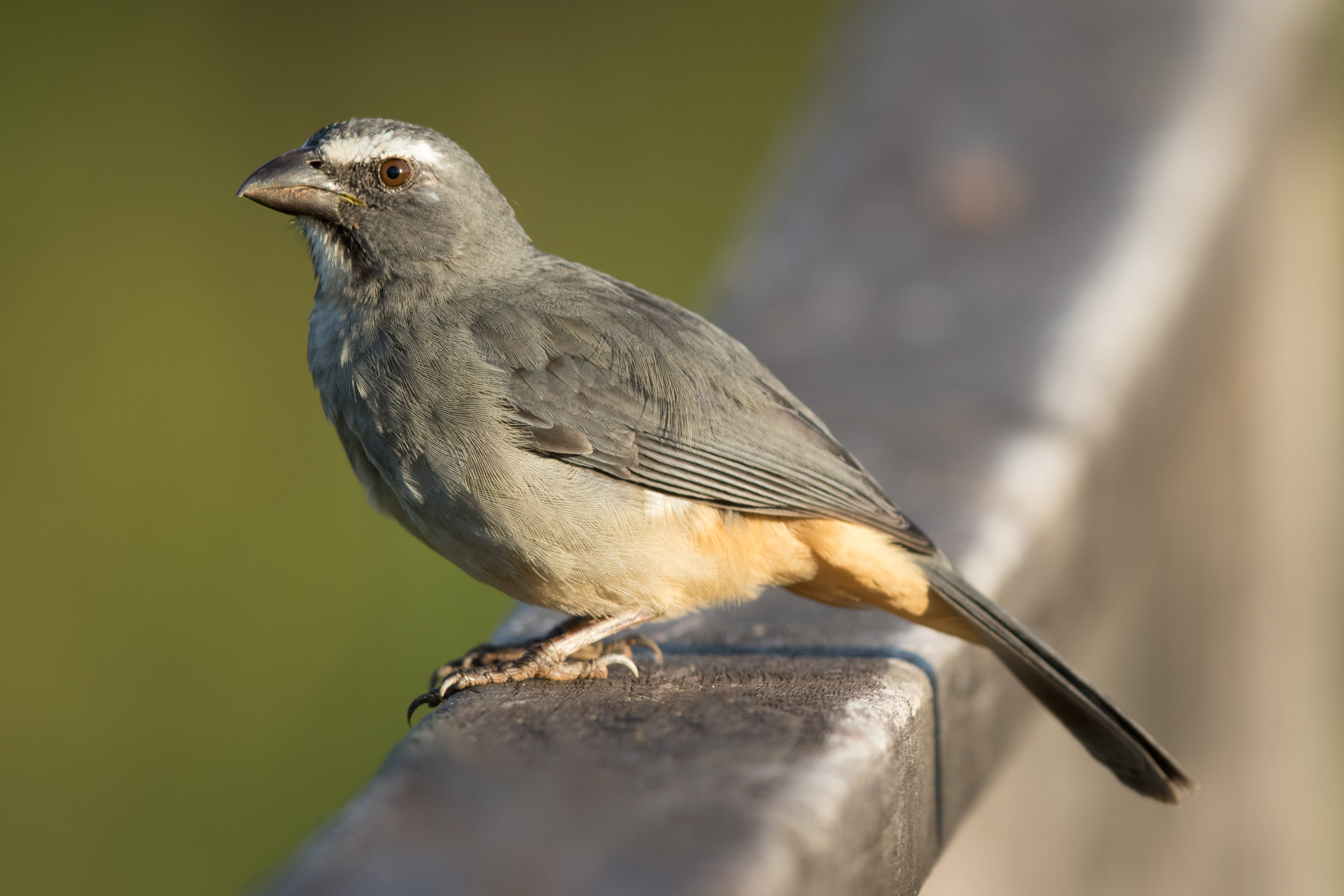
- In the Pantanal, Brazil

Conservation status
- Least Concern (IUCN 3.1)

Scientific classification
- Kingdom: Animalia
- Phylum: Chordata
- Class: Aves
- Order: Passeriformes
- Family: Thraupidae
- Genus: Saltator
- Species: S. coerulescens

Binomial name
- Saltator coerulescens Vieillot, 1817
- Range in green

= Bluish-grey saltator =

Species of bird

The bluish-grey saltator or Amazonian grey saltator (Saltator coerulescens) is a passerine bird in the tanager family Thraupidae that is widespread in semi-open habitats in tropical and subtropical South America.

Two of its former subspecies groups, grandis (of Mexico and Central America) and olivascens (of northern South America and Trinidad), are now recognized as separate species, the cinnamon-bellied saltator and the olive-grey (or Caribbean grey) saltator.

== Taxonomy ==
The bluish-grey saltator was formally described in 1817 by the French ornithologist Louis Pierre Vieillot under the binomial name Saltator coerulescens. Vieillot based his description on the "Habia de la Ceja Blanca" that Félix de Azara had described in 1802 in his book on birds in Paraguay and the Río de la Plata. The specific epithet coerulescens is derived from Latin and means "bluish".

Saltator coerulescens was formerly known as the greyish saltator and included two subspecies groups: grandis (including brevicaudus, hesperis, plumbiceps, vigorsii and yucatanensis) and olivascens (including brewsteri and plumbeus). In 2021, they were recognized as separate species, the cinnamon-bellied saltator (S. grandis) and olive-grey (or Caribbean grey) saltator (S. olivascens). With these as separate species, S. coerulescens includes the subspecies azarae, mutus and superciliaris.

== Description ==
On average, the bluish-grey saltator is 20 cm long and weighs 52 g. The plumage depends on age and subspecies, but in general this bird has grey or greyish-olive upperparts, a white stripe over the eye, a narrow white throat, a grey breast and a buff or cinnamon belly.

The common call is a long-drawn upward slur, ch'wheeet or ch'kweeee, sometimes with a more elaborate beginning, as hi'whee chu weeeeh. The song is a warble, usually fairly short, varying from nasal to mellow.

== Distribution and habitat ==
This species occurs in a wide range of semi-open habitats, such as woodlands, scrub and edges of forest (it avoids the interior of dense forests) in tropical and subtropical South America, including northern Argentina, western Uruguay, Paraguay, widely in Brazil (being replaced by the olive-grey saltator in the extreme north near the borders with the Guianas and Venezuela), Bolivia, eastern Peru, eastern Ecuador, and southeastern Colombia (being replaced by the olive-grey saltator in central and northern parts of the country).

== Behaviour and ecology ==
The bluish-grey saltator feeds on fruits, buds and slow-moving arthropods. It forages at low and middle levels, sometimes in pairs or small groups and sometimes with mixed-species flocks that may include other saltators.

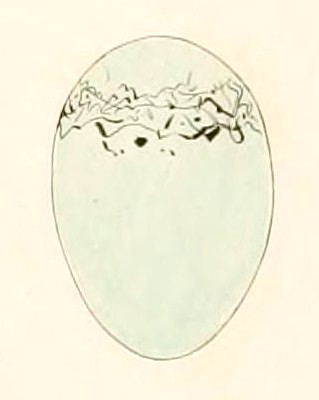
Egg

The two pale blue subelliptic eggs per clutch measure some 23–31.5 mm long by about 17–22 mm wide and weigh about 5 grams each. They look unusual for this genus as they have a circle of blackish-brown hairstreaks and dots around the blunt end. They are laid in a bulky cup nest 2–4 m high in a tree.
