= Cortland =

Cortland may refer to:

== Places ==
=== In space ===
- 27776 Cortland, an asteroid

=== United States ===
- Cortland, Illinois, a town
- Cortland, Indiana, an unincorporated community
- Cortland, Nebraska, a village
- Cortland, New York, a city
- Cortland, Ohio, a city
- Cortland, West Virginia, an unincorporated community
- Cortland, Wisconsin, a ghost town
- Cortland County, New York
- Cortland Township, DeKalb County, Illinois

== People ==
- Cortland Finnegan (born 1984), American retired National Football League player
- Cortland Fitzsimmons (1893–1949), American writer, screenwriter, and author of crime fiction

== Other uses ==
- Cortland (apple)
- Cortland at Colliers Yard, a residential skyscraper in Salford, England
- One of the codenames of the Apple IIGS during its development
- USS Cortland (APA-75), a World War II attack transport ship

== See also ==
- Cortlandt (disambiguation)
- Courtland (disambiguation)
- State University of New York College at Cortland, informally known as SUNY Cortland or Cortland State
