= Kortlandt =

Kortlandt is a surname. Notable people with the surname include:

- Adriaan Kortlandt (1918–2009), Dutch ethologist
- Frederik Kortlandt (born 1946), Dutch linguist

== See also ==
- Cortlandt (disambiguation)
