= Courtland =

Courtland may refer to:

== Places in the United States ==
- Courtland, Alabama, a town
- Courtland, Arizona, a ghost town
- Courtland, California, a census-designated place
- Courtland, Kansas, a city
- Courtland, Minnesota, a city
- Courtland, Mississippi, a town
- Courtland, Virginia, a town
- Courtland, Wisconsin, a town
- Courtland Island, a hill on Iona Island (New York) that was once considered separate
- Courtland Township, Michigan
- Courtland Township, Nicollet County, Minnesota
- Courtland Township, Republic County, Kansas

== People ==
- Courtland (name), a list of people with the surname or given name

== Other uses ==
- Courtland Center, an enclosed shopping mall in Burton, Michigan
- Courtland High School, Spotsylvania County, Virginia
- Hotel Courtland, Canton, Ohio, on the National Register of Historic Places
- Courtland (RTA Rapid Transit station), Cleveland, Ohio

== See also ==
- Cortland (disambiguation)
- Cortlandt (disambiguation)
- North Courtland, Alabama
