= Preening =

Maintenance behaviour of birds

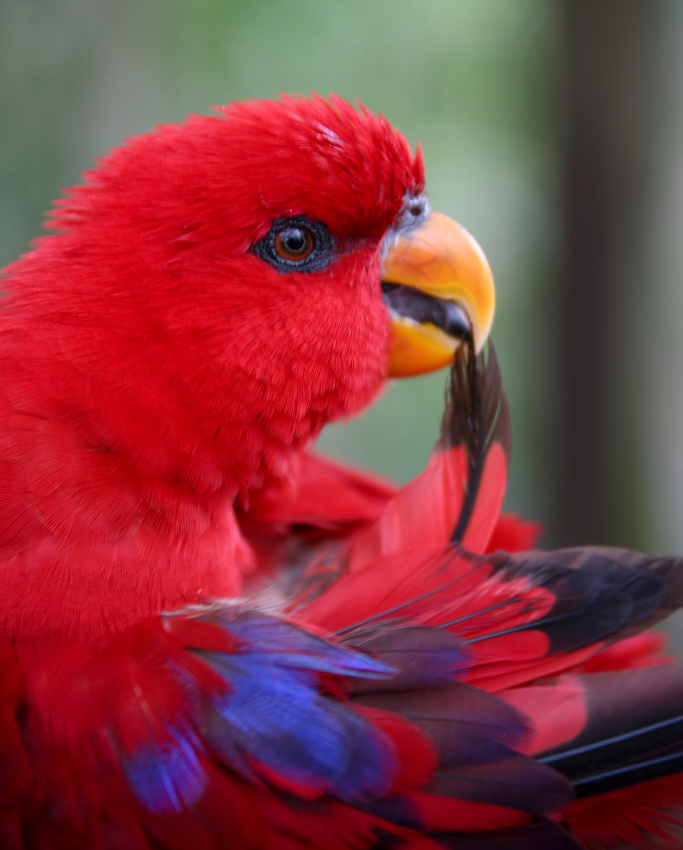
When preening, a bird (such as this red lory) draws individual feathers through its beak, realigning and re-interlocking the barbules.

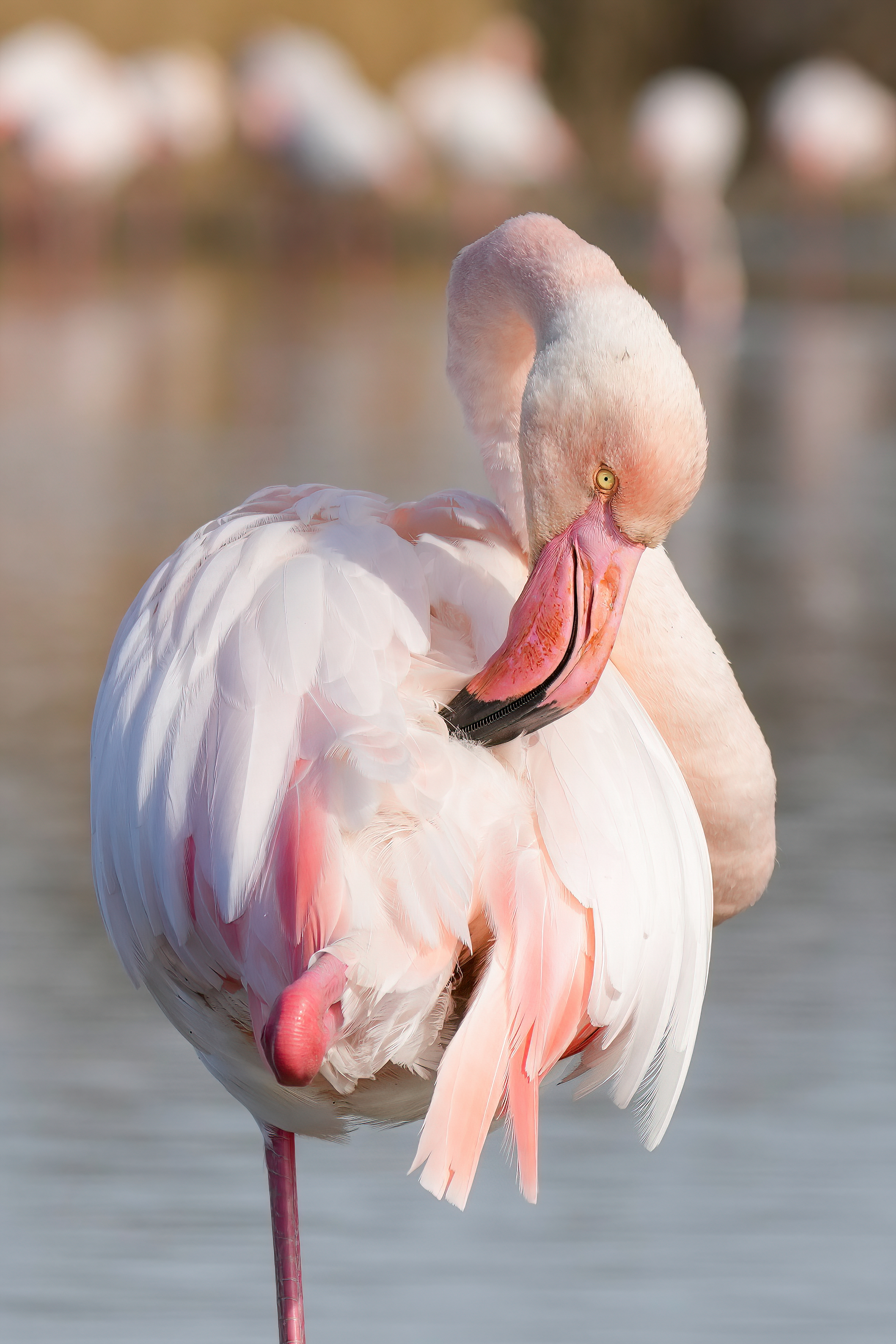
Greater flamingo preening in Camargue, France

Preening is a maintenance behaviour found in birds that involves the use of the beak to position feathers, interlock feather barbules that have become separated, clean plumage, and keep ectoparasites in check. Feathers contribute significantly to a bird's insulation, waterproofing and aerodynamic flight, and so are vital to its survival. Because of this, birds spend considerable time each day maintaining their feathers, primarily through preening. Several actions make up preening behaviour. Birds fluff up and shake their feathers, which helps to "rezip" feather barbules that have become unhooked. Using their beaks, they gather preen oil from a gland at the base of their tail and distribute this oil through their feathers. They draw each contour feather through their bill, nibbling it from base to tip.

Over time, some elements of preening have evolved to have secondary functions. Ritualised preening has become a part of some courtship displays, for example. It is also a displacement activity that can occur when birds are subjected to two conflicting drives. Though primarily an individual function, preening can be a social activity involving two or more birds – a behaviour known as allopreening. In general, allopreening occurs either between two members of a mated pair or between flock members in a social species. Such behaviour may assist in effective grooming, in the recognition of individuals (mates or potential sexual partners), or in reducing or redirecting potential aggressive tendencies in social species. Most allopreening is confined to the head and neck, smaller efforts being directed towards other parts of the body.

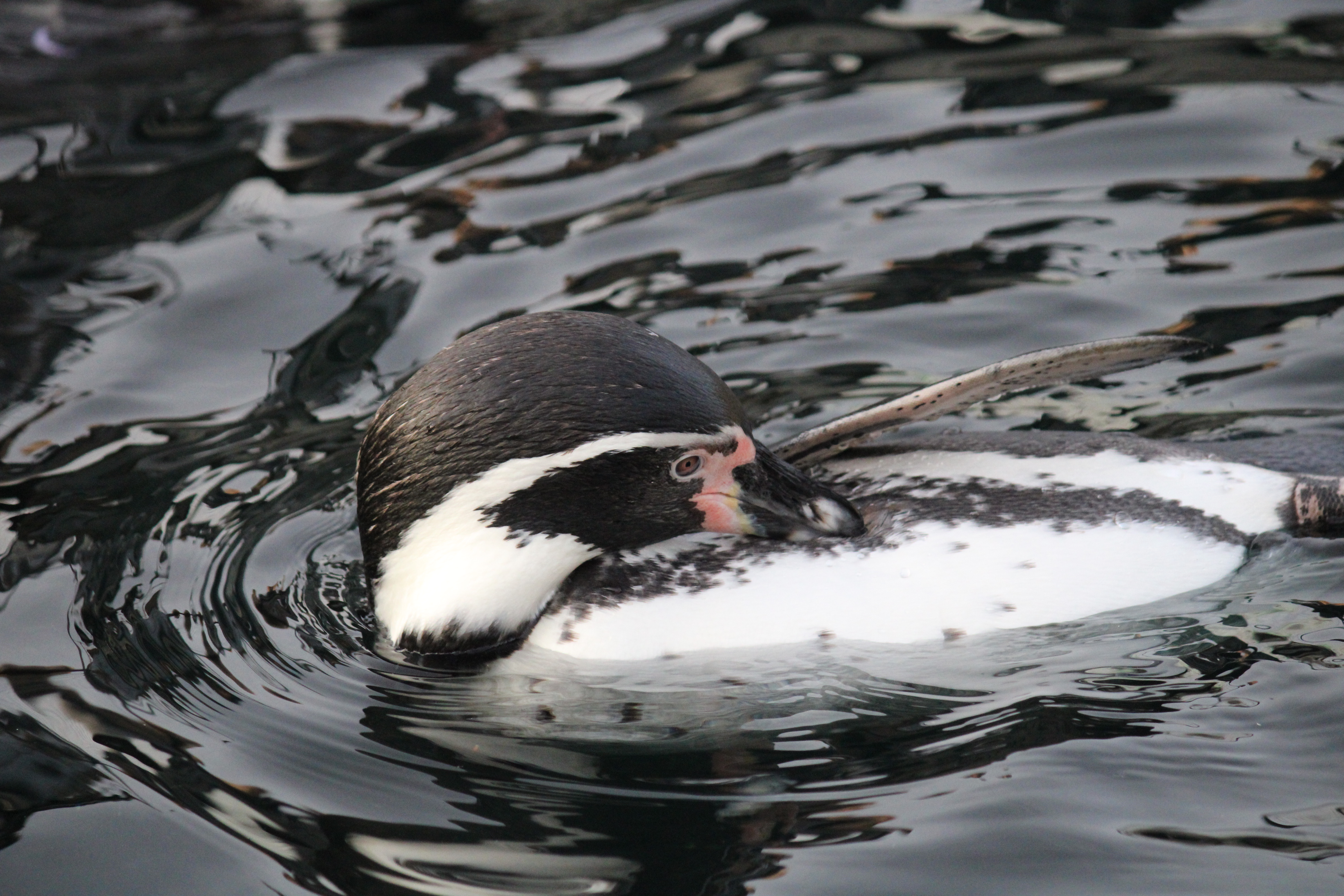
A humboldt penguin preening at Copenhagen Zoo, Denmark

Ingestion of pollutants or disease-causing organisms during preening can lead to problems ranging from liver and kidney damage to pneumonia and disease transmission. Injury and infection can cause overpreening in caged birds, as can confining a bird with a dominant or aggressive cage mate.

== Etymology ==
The use of the word preen to mean the tidying of a bird's feathers dates from Late Middle English. It appears to be a variant of the word prune; one now-obsolete definition of prune meant "anoint", based on the Latin ungere, which had the same meaning. This usage was combined with the Scottish and northern English dialect preen meaning "pierce" or "pin", due to the "pricking" action of the bird's beak during preening.

== Importance ==
A mallard and her ducklings demonstrate the shaking, nibbling and stroking movements of preening.

Preening is a maintenance behaviour used by all birds to care for their feathers. It is an innate behaviour; birds are born knowing the basics, but there is a learned component. Birds that are hand-reared without access to a role model have abnormalities in their preening behaviours. Despite spending considerable time in their efforts, they do not use proper techniques to groom effectively and may do a poor job overall as a result. Displaced feathers can cause birds considerable trouble; such feathers might become damaged, could interrupt the smooth flow of air over a flying bird, or might allow the bird's body heat to escape. Preening allows a bird to reposition such displaced feathers. There is evidence that filoplumes, specialised feathers buried under a bird's outer covering of contour feathers, help to signal when contour feathers have been displaced. Mechanoreceptors at the base of the filoplumes only fire when contour feathers are displaced or the filoplume moves. Preening enables birds to remove dirt and parasites from their plumage, and assists in the waterproofing of feathers. During moult, birds remove the sheaths from around their emerging pin feathers while preening.

Because feathers are critical to a bird's survival – contributing to insulation, waterproofing and aerodynamic flight – birds spend a great deal of time maintaining them. When resting, birds may preen at least once an hour. Studies on multiple species have shown that they spend an average of more than 9% of each day on maintenance behaviours, preening occupying over 92% of that time, though this figure can be significantly higher. Studies found that some gull species spent 15% of daylight hours during the breeding season preening, while another showed that common loons spent upwards of 25% of their day preening. In most of the studied species where the bird's sex could be determined in the field, males spent more time preening than females, though this was reversed in ducks. Some ratites, which are not dependent on their feathers for flight, spend far less time on maintenance behaviours. One study of ostriches found that they spent less than 1% of their time engaged in such behaviours.

== Preen oil ==
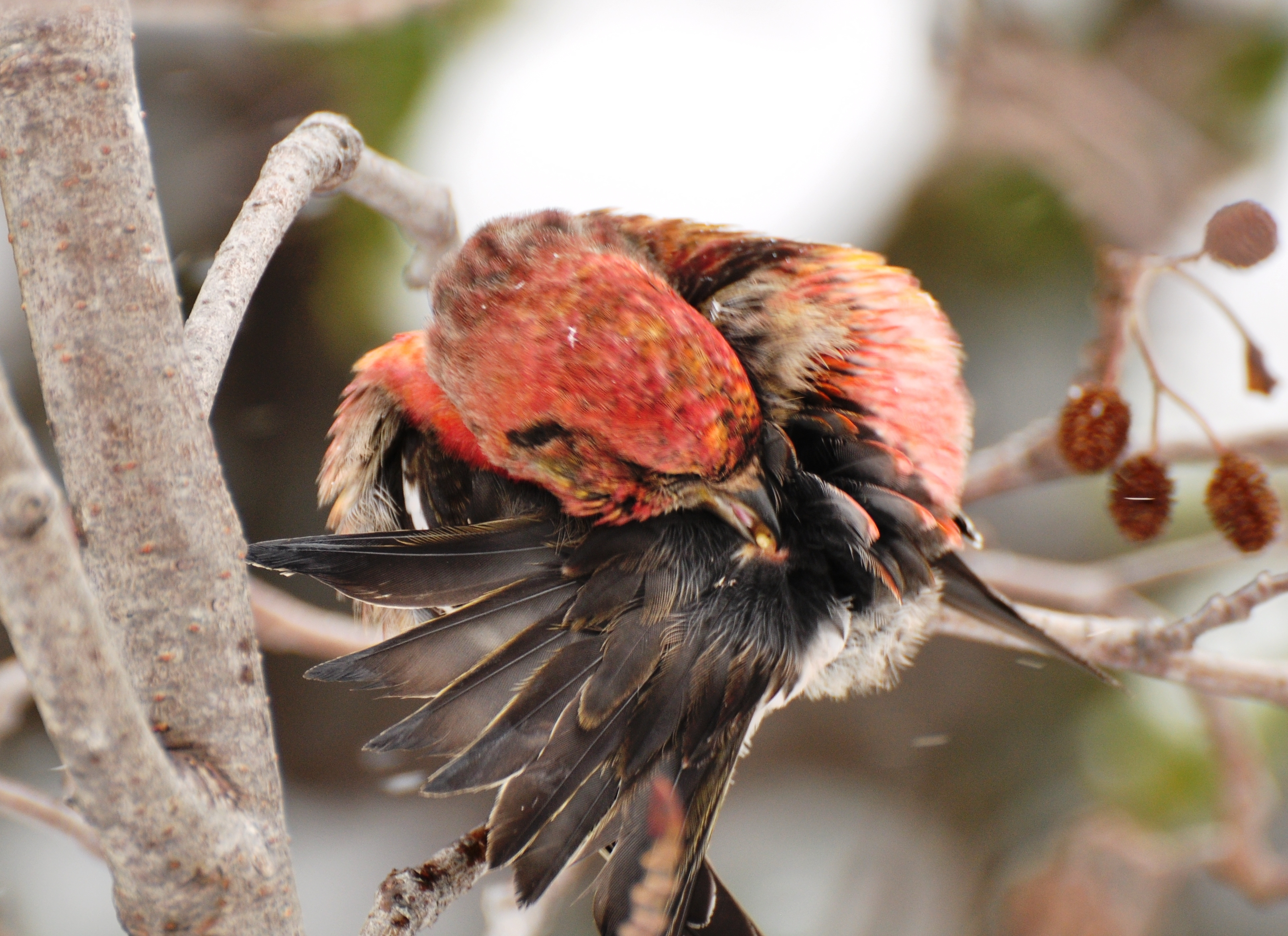
Birds, like this two-barred crossbill, typically use their beak to gather preen gland oil from the uropygial gland.

Fully grown feathers are essentially dead structures, so it is vital that birds have some way to protect and lubricate them. Otherwise, age and exposure cause them to become brittle. To facilitate that care, many bird species have a preen or uropygial gland, which opens above the base of the tail feathers and secretes a substance containing fatty acids, water, and waxes. The bird gathers this substance on its bill and applies it to its feathers. The gland is generally larger (in relation to body size) in waterbirds, including terns, grebes and petrels. However, studies have found no clear correlation between the size of the gland and the amount of time a species spends in the water; it is not consistently largest in those species that spend the most time in the water.

Preen oil plays a role in reducing the presence of parasitic organisms, such as feather-degrading bacteria, lice and fungi, on a bird's feathers. One study of Eurasian hoopoes showed that the presence of symbiotic bacteria (Enterococcus faecalis) in their preen oil inhibited the growth of the feather-degrading bacteria Bacillus licheniformis. Enterococcus faecalis did this by releasing a bacteriocin. Female hoopoes transfer preen oil onto their brood patches and eggs, which results in the transfer of bacteria as well. Preen oil and bacteria are rubbed into microscopic pits on the surface of the eggs during incubation. This alters the colour of the eggs (darkening them) but there is also evidence that the bacteria may help to protect the developing chicks. Other studies have shown that removing or restricting access to the uropygial gland typically results in a higher bacterial parasite load on the plumage, though not necessarily of feather-degrading bacterial species. Preen oil may play a part in protecting at least some species from some internal parasites; a study of the incidence of avian malaria in house sparrows found that uninfected birds had larger uropygial glands and higher antimicrobial activity in those glands than infected birds did. There is even evidence that the foul-smelling preen oil of hoopoes and wood hoopoes may help to repel mammalian predators.

Preen oil helps to maintain the waterproofing of a bird's plumage. Though the oil does not provide any direct waterproofing agent, it helps to extend the life of the feather – including the microscopic structures (the barbs and barbules) which interlock to create the waterproof barrier.

While most species have a preen gland, the organ is missing in the ratites (emu, ostriches, cassowaries, rheas and kiwis) and some neognath birds, including bustards, woodpeckers, a few parrots and pigeons. Some species that lack a preen gland instead have powder down feathers which continually break down into a fine dust that the birds apply to their contour feathers while preening. These powder down feathers may be scattered throughout the bird's plumage or concentrated into dense patches. As well as helping to waterproof and preserve the bird's feathers, powder down can give a metallic sheen to the plumage.

== Preening action ==
A shaft runs down the middle of the feather with barbs branching from the main shaft and hooked barbules branching from those barbs. The barbules' hooks interlock as shown to provide strength and flexibility.

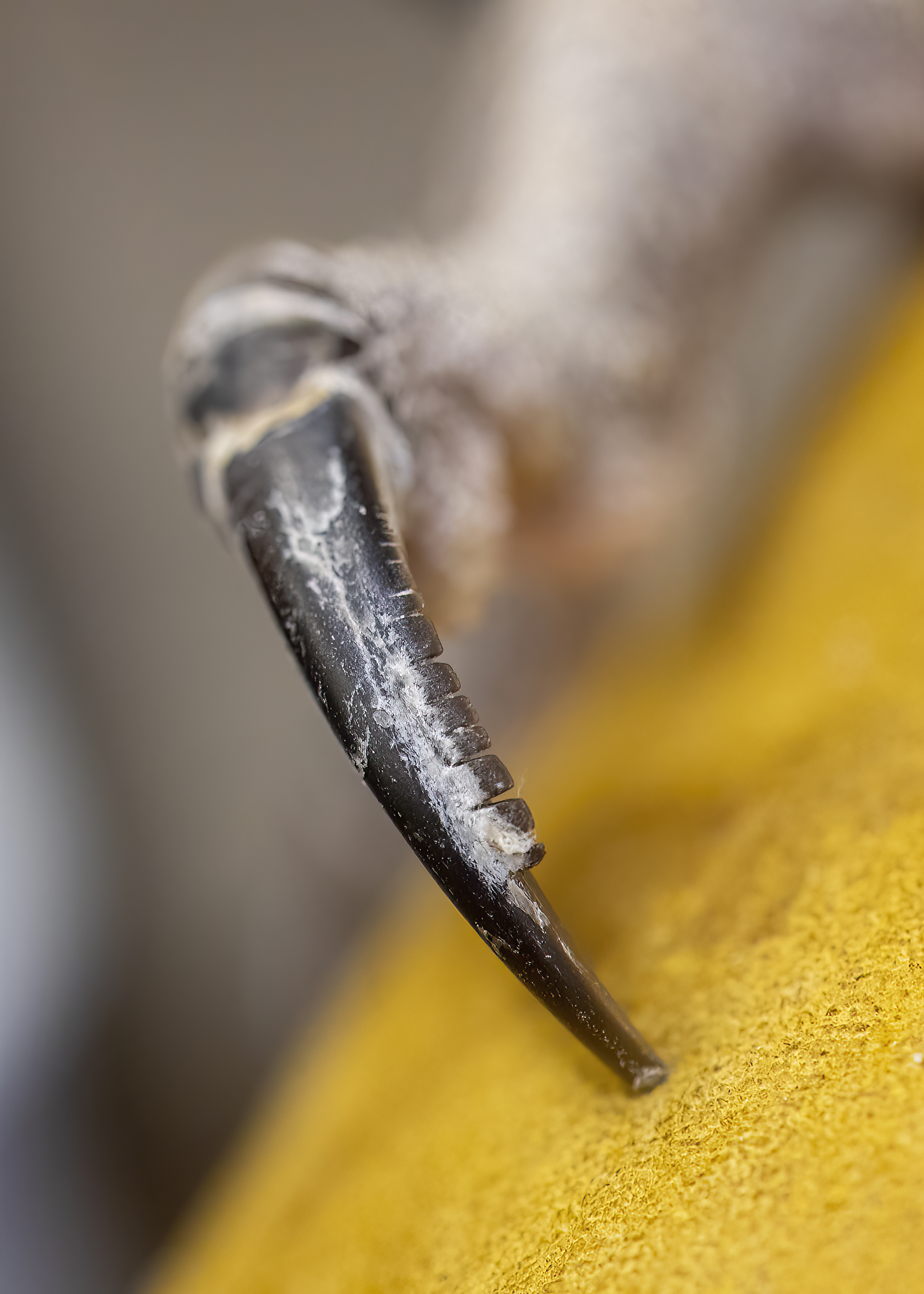
The specialized pectinate claw of a barn owl is used as a comb for facial preening.

A bird's plumage is primarily made up of two feather types: firm vaned or pennaceous feathers on the surface, with softer down feathers underneath. Both feather types have a central shaft with narrower barbs branching from that shaft. Pennaceous feathers also have much smaller barbules branching from the entire length of each barb; these barbules have tiny hooks along their length, which interlock with the hooks of neighbouring barbules. Barbules can become unhooked as a result of a bird's daily activities – dislodged when the bird brushes up against vegetation, for instance, or when it interacts with another bird during fighting or mating. Preening may involve two kinds of bill actions: nibbling (or mandibulating) while working the feather from base to tip, or stroking with the bill either open or closed. The nibbling action is the one used most often; it is more effective than stroking for applying preen oil, removing ectoparasites, rejoining unzipped barbules, and rearranging feathers. The stroking action is typically done in the direction the feathers lie, with the bill either opened or closed. Stroking is used to apply preen oil, as well as to dry and smooth plumage. Grebes stroke more vigorously with an open bill – a behaviour known as "stropping". Penguins use their whole heads to stroke, in a motion referred to as "wiping". Birds regularly fluff up their plumage and repeatedly shake their bodies while preening. Experiments have shown that the shaking action can "rezip" a majority of split feather barbules.

Birds, like this mute swan, "nibble" their feathers from base to tip while preening.

Birds cannot use their beaks to apply preen oil to their own heads. Instead, many use their feet in an action called scratch-preening. Once they have gathered preen oil on their beak, they scrape a foot across their bill to transfer the oil, and then scratch the oil into the feathers on their head. Longer-necked birds may rub their head directly on their uropygial gland. Some species (including nightjars, herons, frigatebirds, owls and pratincoles) have comb-like serrations on the claw (a pectinate claw) of the middle toe which may aid in scratch-preening. Some species stretch their leg over their lowered wing to reach their head (known as "indirect" scratching), while others extend their leg between their wing and their body (known as "direct" scratching). There is some evidence that the method used by a species may be related to its ecology. For instance, New World warblers that are primarily arboreal tend to be overwing scratchers, while those that spend significant time on the ground are typically underwing scratchers. In general, preening takes place while the bird is perched, on the ground, or swimming, but some of the more aerial species (including swifts, swallows, terns and albatrosses) preen while flying. Many birds have a slight overhang at the tip of their upper mandible. Experiments suggest that this allows birds to apply shearing forces that kill the flat-bodied feather lice; the removal of the bill tip caused an increase in feather lice due to ineffective preening.

Preening is often done in association with other maintenance behaviours, including bathing, dusting, sunning, oiling or anting, and can either precede or follow these other behaviours. All birds typically preen after bathing. Groups of birds sometimes all groom individually at the same time. This has been seen in species ranging from herons to blackbirds.

== Secondary functions ==
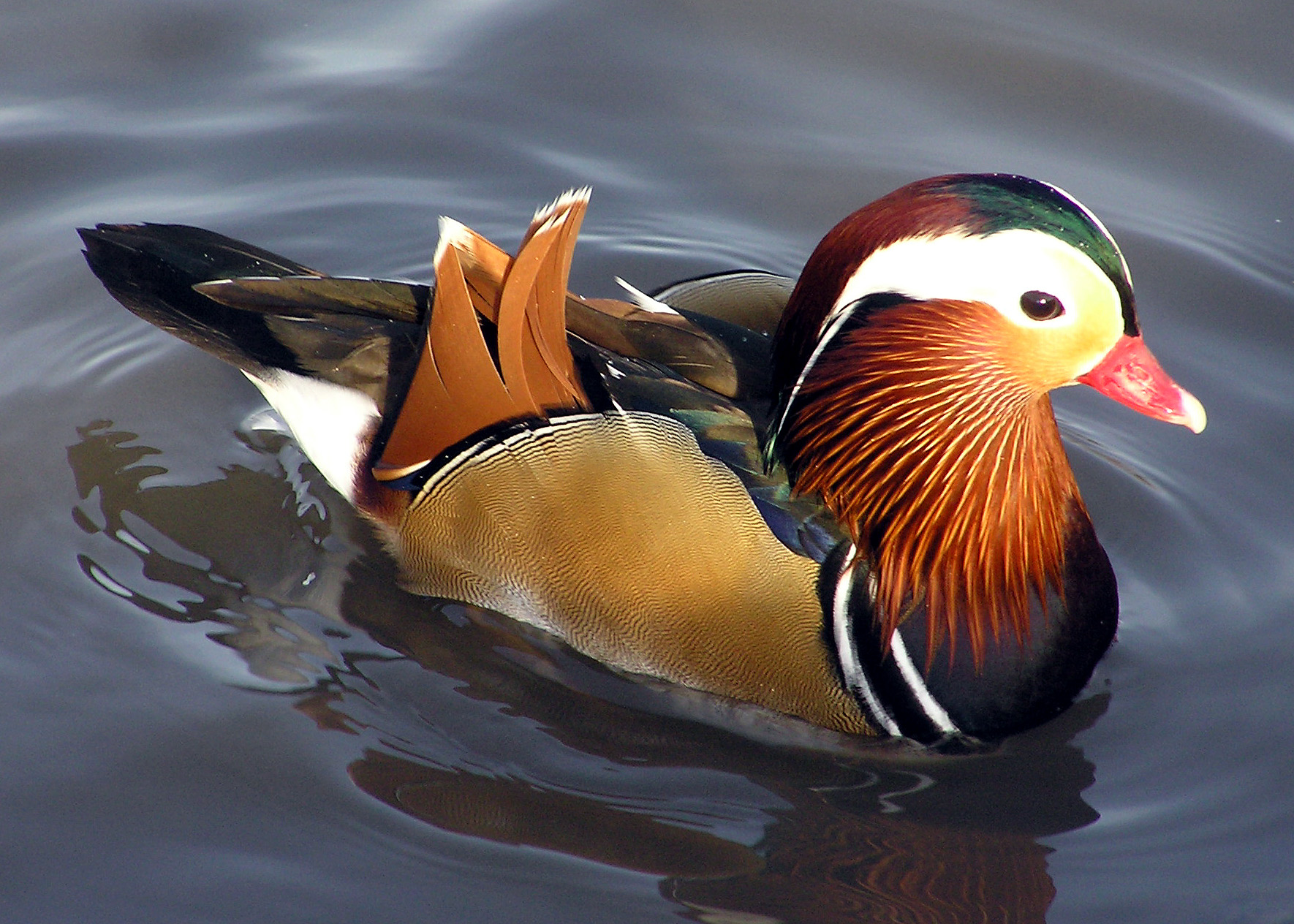
During courtship, drake mandarin ducks ritually preen their distinctive orange "sail" feathers.

Preening may help to send sexual signals to potential mates because plumage colouration (which can be altered by the act of preening) can reliably reflect the health or "quality" of its bearer. In some species, preen oil is used to cosmetically colour the plumage. During the breeding season, the preen oil of the great white pelican becomes red-orange, imparting a pink flush to the bird's plumage. The preen oil of several gull and tern species, including Ross's gull, contains a pink colourant which does the same. The heads of these birds typically show little pink, because of the difficulty of reaching those areas with preen oil. The yellow feathers of the great hornbill are also cosmetically coloured during preening. The preen oil of the Bohemian waxwing increases the UV reflectance of its feathers. Ritualised preening is used in courtship displays by several species, particularly ducks; such preening is typically designed to draw attention to a modified structure (such as the sail-shaped secondaries of the drake mandarin duck) or distinctive colour (such as the speculum) on the bird. Mallards of both sexes will lift a wing so that the brightly coloured speculum is showing, then will place their bill behind the speculum as if preening it. Courtship preening is more conspicuous than is preening for feather maintenance, using more stereotypical movements.

Preening may be performed as a displacement activity. In some cases, it is done in place of another activity that birds are strongly motivated, but unable, to do. In one study, black-headed gulls which were prevented from incubating a full clutch of eggs (by the removal of eggs from their nest) responded by preening and nest building – both displacement activities. When all three eggs in their regular clutch were removed, the gulls showed a significant increase in the amount of time they spent preening. The conflict between two incompatible drives, such as incubating and escape, can lead a bird to engage in displacement activities. Nesting Sandwich and common terns preen when they have been alarmed by a potential predator or when they have had an aggressive encounter with a neighbouring bird, for instance. Fighting European starlings will break off their battles to preen.

== Allopreening ==
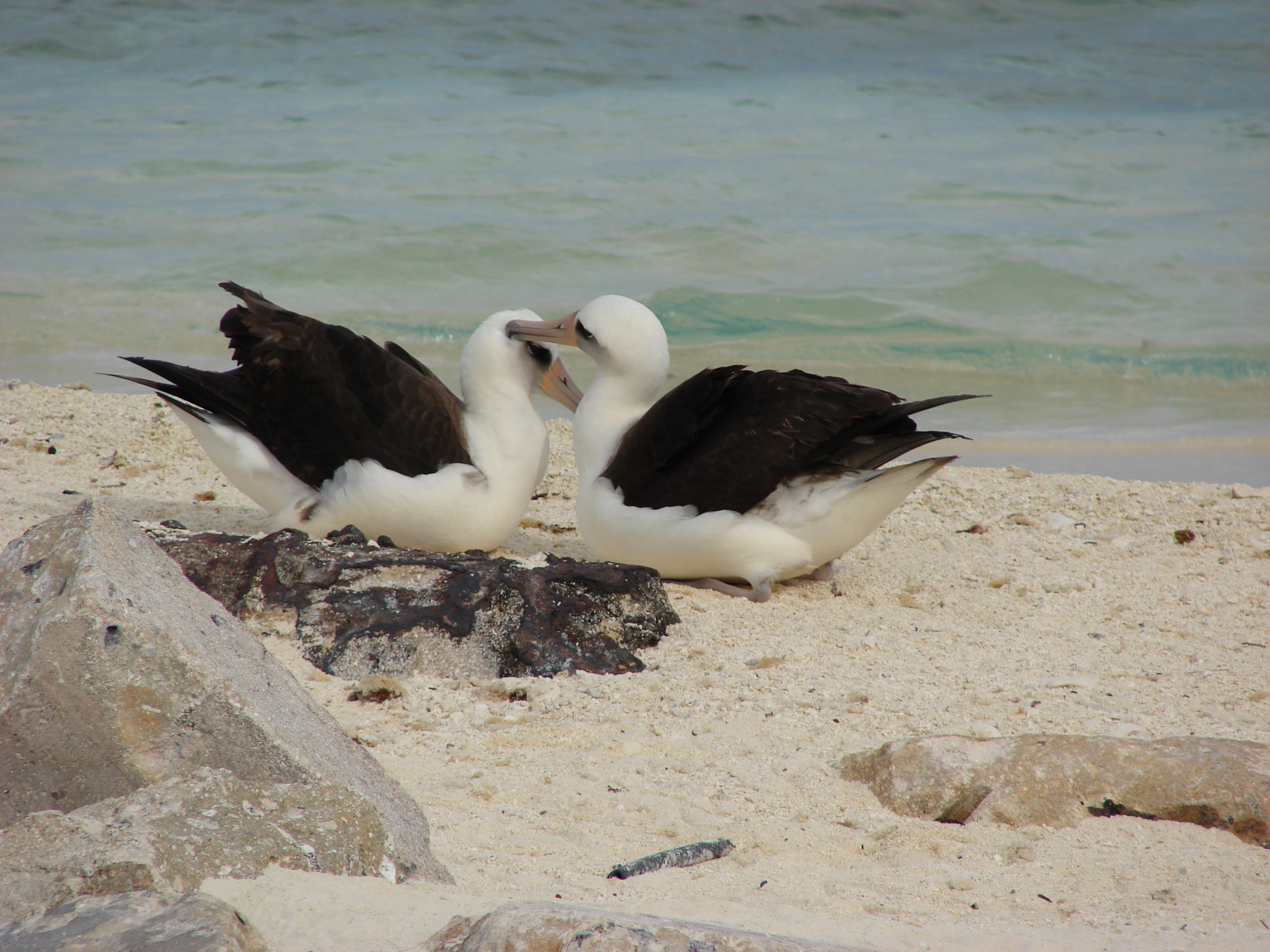
Allopreening may help to strengthen pair bonds in species such as the Laysan albatross.

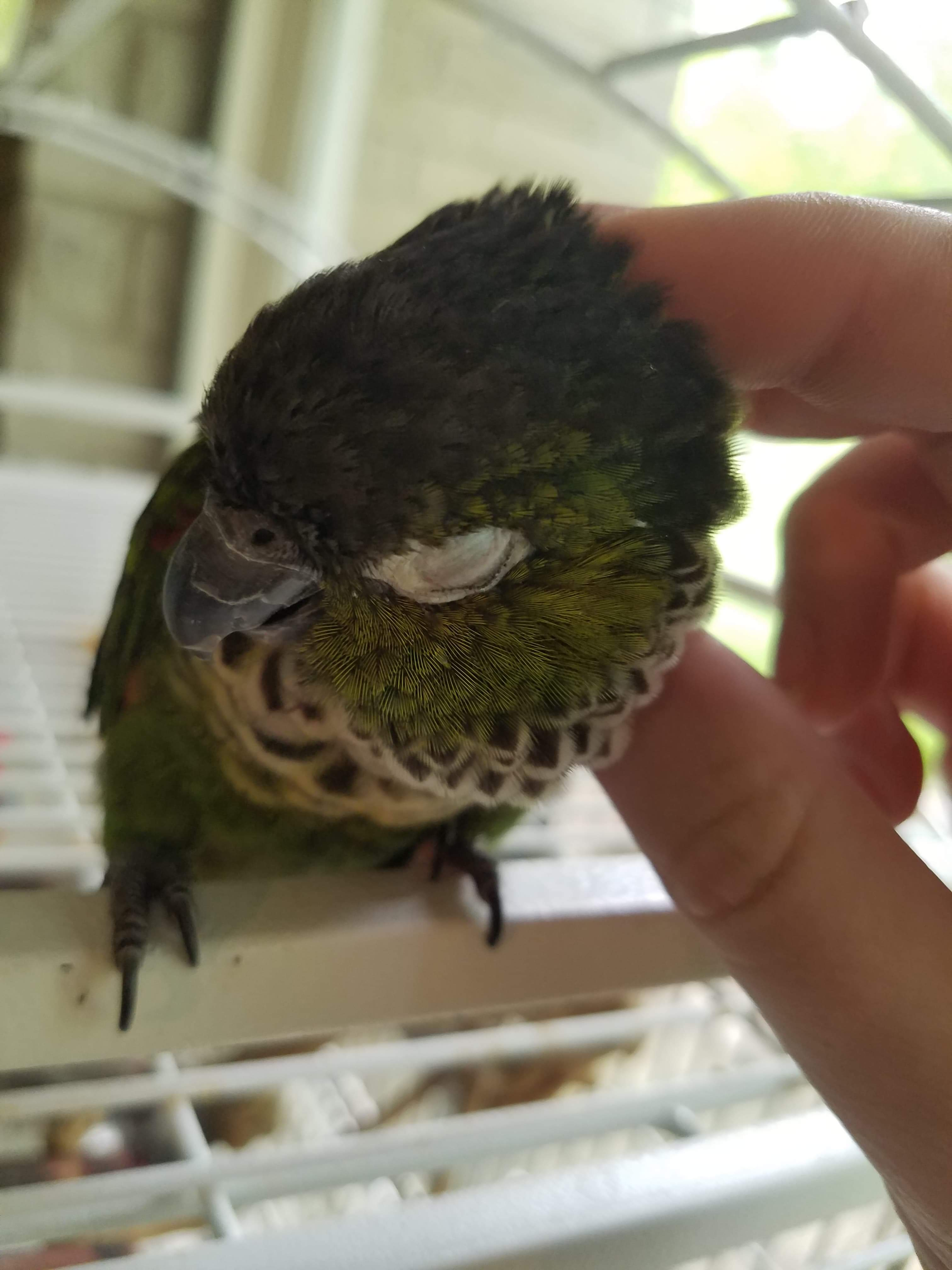
Some pet parrots, such as this black-capped conure, may solicit preening from humans.

Although preening is primarily an individual behaviour, some species indulge in allopreening, one individual preening another. It is not particularly common among birds, though species from at least 43 families are known to engage in the mutual activity. Most allopreening activity concentrates on the head and neck, a lesser amount being directed towards the breast and mantle and an even smaller percentage applied to the flanks. A few species are known to allopreen other areas, including the rump, tail, belly and underwing.

Several hypotheses have been advanced to explain the behaviour: that it assists in effective grooming, that it assists in recognition of individuals (mates or potential sexual partners), and that it assists in social communication, reducing or redirecting potential aggressive tendencies. These functions are not mutually exclusive. Evidence suggests that different species may participate for different reasons, and that those reasons may change depending on the season and the individuals involved. In most cases, allopreening involves members of the same species, although some cases of interspecific allopreening are known; the vast majority of these involve icterids, though at least one instance of mutual grooming between a wild black vulture and a wild crested caracara has been documented. Birds seeking allopreening adopt specific, ritualised postures to signal so; they may fluff their feathers out or put their heads down. Captive birds of social species that normally live in flocks, such as parrots, will regularly solicit preening from their human owners.

There is some evidence that allopreening may help to keep in good condition those feathers that a bird cannot easily reach by itself; allopreening activities tend to focus on the head and neck. It may also help to remove ectoparasites from those hard-to-reach areas. Allopreening is most common among species that are regularly in close physical contact due to flocking or social behaviours, where such contact allows for easier transfer of ectoparasites between individuals. In one study, Macaroni penguins that frequently allopreened had significantly fewer ticks on their heads and necks than those that did not. Green wood hoopoes, a flocking species with a complex hierarchy, show similar frequencies of initiating and reciprocating allopreening of the head and neck regardless of social status, time of year or group size, which suggests that such activity is primarily related to feather hygiene.

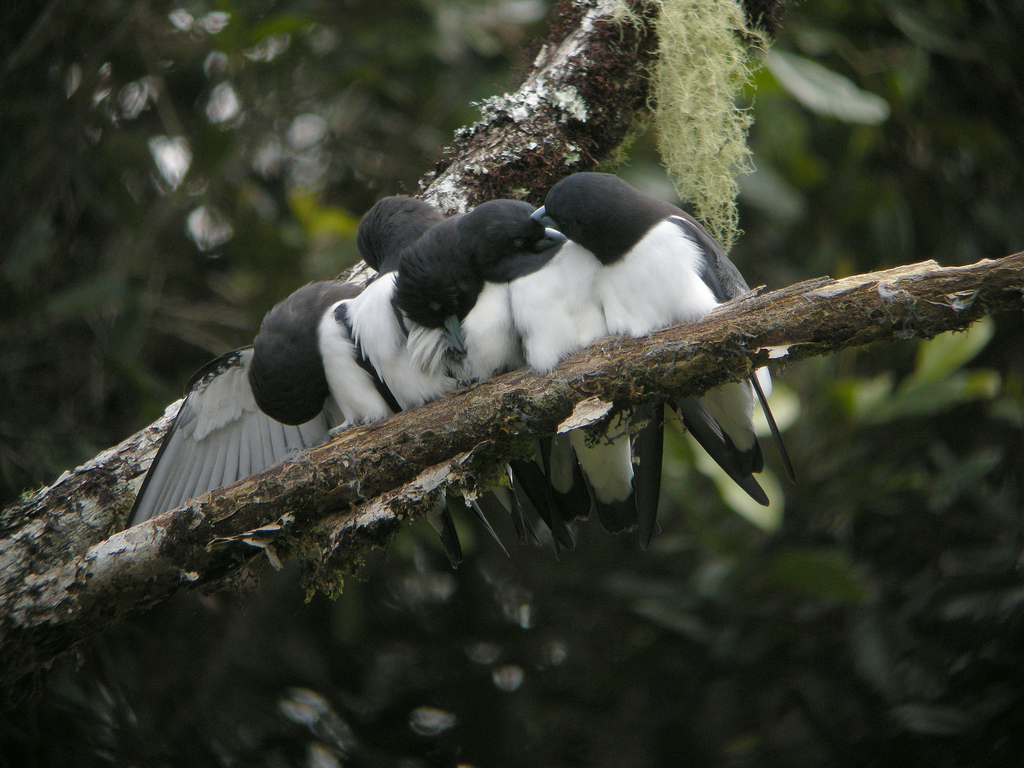
Allopreening can reduce or redirect aggression within a flock, as with these great woodswallows.

Most allopreening is done between the two members of a mated pair, and the activity appears to play an important role in strengthening and maintaining pair bonds. It is more common in species where both parents help to raise the offspring and correlates with an increased likelihood that partners will remain together for successive breeding seasons. Allopreening often features as part of the "greeting ceremony" between the members of a pair in species such as albatrosses and penguins, where partners may be separated for a relatively long period of time, and is far more common among sexually monomorphic species (that is, species where the sexes look outwardly similar). It appears to inhibit or redirect aggression, as it is typically the dominant bird that initiates the behaviour.

Allopreening appears to reduce the incidence of conflict between members of some colonially living or colonially nesting species. Neighbouring common guillemots that engaged in allopreening were much less likely to fight. Since fights often lead to eggs or chicks being knocked off breeding cliffs, fewer fights led to greater breeding success for allopreening neighbours. Among social flocks of green wood hoopoes, rates of body allopreening (that is, allopreening of another bird's body rather than head and neck) increase with group size. Evidence suggests this type of allopreening reduces social tension, and thus plays an important role in group cohesion. More dominant birds receive far more body allopreening services than do lower-ranked birds, and lower-ranked birds initiate far more body allopreening bouts than do their higher-ranked flock mates. Body allopreening is only reciprocal when done between members of a mated pair; otherwise, the dominant bird reciprocates in fewer than 10% of the instances.

=== Interspecific allopreening ===
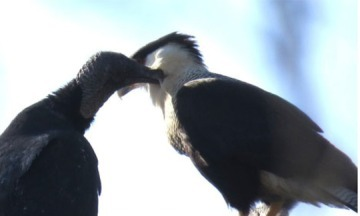
Black vulture preening a crested caracara, in Texas

While allopreening usually occurs between members of the same species in the wild, it is also known to occur between members of different species. For example, black vultures have on several occasions been recorded preening crested caracaras.

== Potential problems ==
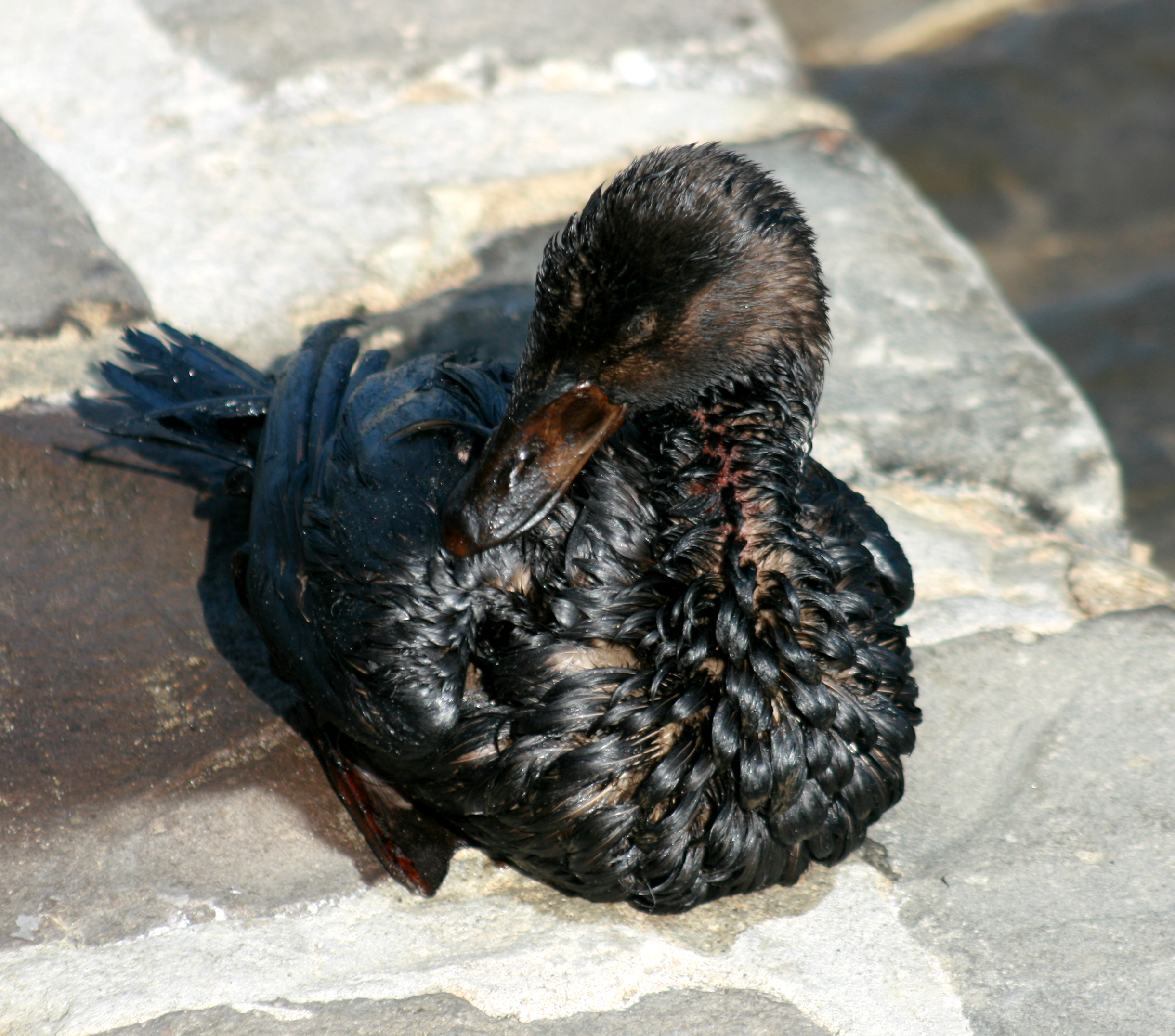
Oiled birds, like this surf scoter, can quickly ingest harmful or fatal amounts of oil during their attempts to preen.

If birds are exposed to some pollutants, such as leaking petroleum, they can quickly lose the preen oil from their feathers. This causes a loss of heat regulation and waterproofing, and rapidly leads to the bird becoming chilled. If waterbirds are exposed, they can lose both buoyancy and the ability to fly; this means they must swim constantly to stay warm and afloat (if they cannot reach land), and eventually die of exhaustion. While preening in an effort to clean themselves, they may ingest harmfully large amounts of the petroleum. Ingested oil can cause pneumonia, as well as liver and kidney damage. Studies done with black guillemots showed that even small amounts of ingested oil caused the birds physiological distress. It interfered with the foraging efficiency of adults and decreased the growth rates of young birds.

Allopreening may facilitate disease transmission between infected and non-infected individuals. West Nile virus has been found in the feather pulp of several species of corvid, for instance, meaning that birds that preen infected partners might become infected themselves. Even preening its own body may expose a bird to pathogens. There is evidence that water-borne avian influenza virus is "captured" by the preen oil on feathers, providing a possible route for infection. The ingestion of parasites during preening may result in infection; the tick-borne disease louping ill virus can be transmitted to red grouse if the bird consumes a tick carrying the disease.

Caged birds, particularly parrots, sometimes overpreen in response to being exposed to strong scents (such as nicotine or air fresheners) or as a result of neuropathy. Reducing exposure to the offending odour, or treating the underlying cause of the neuropathy (such as injury, infection, or heavy metal intoxication) can help to eliminate the behaviour. Confining a bird with an incompatible or very dominant cage mate can lead to excessive allopreening, which can result in feather plucking or injury.
