= Cortlandt =

Cortlandt may refer to:

== Places ==
- Cortlandt, New York, a town in Westchester County, New York
  - Cortlandt (Metro-North station)
  - Cortlandt Manor, New York, an area of the town
  - Cortlandt Town Center, a shopping center in the town
- Cortlandt Street (Manhattan), a street in New York City
- New York City Subway stations:
  - Cortlandt Street (BMT Broadway Line)
  - Cortlandt Street (IRT Broadway – Seventh Avenue Line), demolished in the September 11th attacks
  - Cortlandt Street (IRT Ninth Avenue Line)
  - Cortlandt Street (IRT Sixth Avenue Line)

== People ==
- Cortlandt F. Bishop (1870–1935), American pioneer aviator, autoist, book collector, and traveler
- Cortlandt V.R. Schuyler (1900–1993), United States Army four-star general
- Cortlandt Skinner (1727–1799), Royal Attorney General of New Jersey and American Revolutionary general
- Cortlandt Starnes (1864–1934), seventh commissioner of the Royal Canadian Mounted Police
- Jacobus Van Cortlandt (1658–1739), wealthy merchant and mayor of New York City
- Philip Van Cortlandt (1749–1831), American surveyor, landowner, and politician from New York
- Pierre Van Cortlandt (1721–1814), first Lieutenant Governor of the State of New York
- Stephanus Van Cortlandt (1643–1700), first native-born mayor of New York City
- Cortlandt Van Rensselaer (1808–1860), US Presbyterian clergyman

== Arts, entertainment, and media ==
=== Fictional characters ===
- Members of a fictional family on the soap opera All My Children:
  - Nina Cortlandt
  - Opal Cortlandt
  - Palmer Cortlandt
  - Pete Cortlandt
  - Pierre Cortlandt

=== Music ===
- Cortlandt (album), a 1996 album by Sean Malone

== See also ==
- Cortland (disambiguation)
- Courtland (disambiguation)
- Van Cortlandt (disambiguation)
