= Displacement activity =

Behaviour due to cognitive conflict

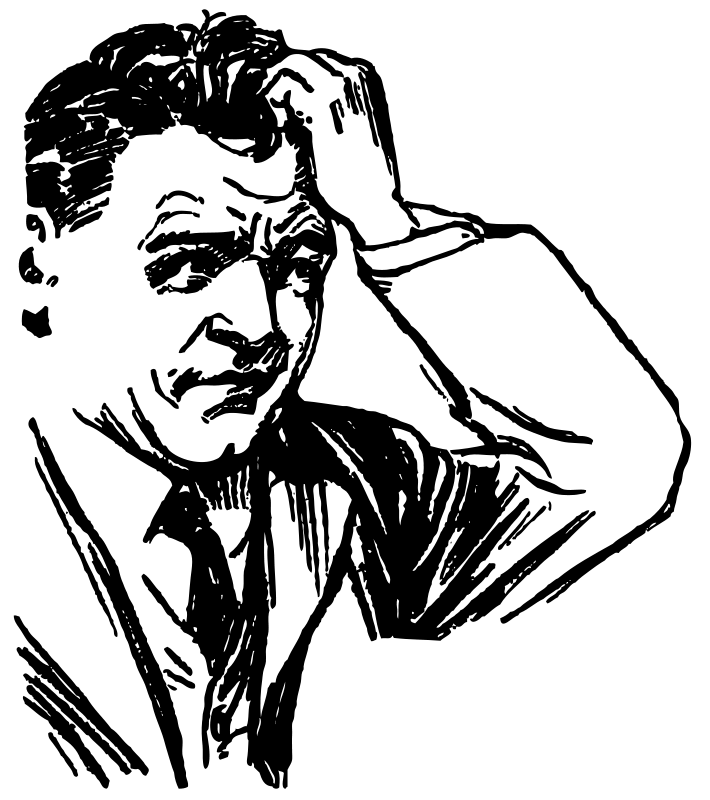
Head-scratching, an example of a displacement activity in humans, can occur when a person does not know which of two options to choose

Displacement activities occur when an animal or human experiences high motivation for two or more conflicting behaviours: the resulting displacement activity is usually unrelated to the competing motivations. Birds, for example, may peck at grass when uncertain whether to attack or flee from an opponent; similarly, a human may scratch their head when they do not know which of two options to choose. Displacement activities may also occur when animals are prevented from performing a single behaviour for which they are highly motivated. Displacement activities often involve actions which bring comfort to the animal such as scratching, preening, drinking or feeding.

In the assessment of animal welfare, displacement activities are sometimes used as evidence that an animal is highly motivated to perform a behaviour that the environment prevents. One example is that when hungry hens are trained to eat from a particular food dispenser and then find the dispenser blocked, they often begin to pace and preen themselves vigorously. These actions have been interpreted as displacement activities, and similar pacing and preening can be used as evidence of frustration in other situations.

Psychiatrist and primatologist Alfonso Troisi proposed that displacement activities can be used as non-invasive measures of stress in primates. He noted that various non-human primates perform self-directed activities such as grooming and scratching in situations likely to involve anxiety and uncertainty, and that these behaviours are increased by anxiogenic (anxiety-producing) drugs and reduced by anxiolytic (anxiety-reducing) drugs. In humans, he noted that similar self-directed behaviour, together with aimless manipulation of objects (chewing pens, twisting rings), can be used as indicators of "stressful stimuli and may reflect an emotional condition of negative affect".

More recently the term 'displacement activity' has been widely adopted to describe a form of procrastination. It is commonly used in the context of what someone does intentionally to keep themselves busy whilst, at the same time, avoiding doing something else that would be a better use of their time.

== History of the concept ==
In 1940, two Dutch researchers Kortlandt and Tinbergen independently identified what was to become known as displacement activities. The subsequent development of research on displacement activities arose from Konrad Lorenz's works on instincts.

Tinbergen in 1952 noted, for example, that "two skylarks engaged in furious combat [may] suddenly peck at the ground as if they were feeding", or birds on the point of mating may suddenly begin to preen themselves. Tinbergen adopted the term "displacement activities" because the behaviour appeared to be displaced from one behavioural system into another.

In 1902, in The Little White Bird, J. M. Barrie refers to sheep in Kensington Gardens nibbling the grass in nervous agitation immediately after being shorn, and to Solomon, the wise crow, drinking water when he was frustrated and outwitted in an argument with other birds. Another bird encourages him to drink in order to compose himself. These references to displacement activities in a work of literature indicate that the phenomenon was well recognized at the turn of the twentieth century. A further early description of a displacement activity (though not the use of the term) is by Julian Huxley in 1914.

== See also ==
- Displacement (psychology)
- Ethogram
- Procrastination
- Vacuum activity
