= Cortlandt Town Center =

- Location: Mohegan Lake, New York
- Coordinates: 41.31034°N 73.870057°W
- Opened: 1997
- Num. of anchor tenants: 15 (12 open, 1 closing, 3 vacant)
- Floor area: 772,000 sq ft (71,700 m^{2})
- Floors: 1

The Cortlandt Town Center (formerly known as the Westchester Mall) is a large retail power center located in Cortlandt, New York. The New York Times called it "the main shopping area of the town of Cortlandt Manor" in 2003. The current incarnation (and name) was founded in 1997 from buildings that made up the mostly enclosed Westchester Mall built in 1975. Many new buildings were added as well, and it is currently a predominantly outdoor shopping center, eventually growing to approximately 772,000 sq ft (71,700 m^{2}). Anchor stores include Walmart, The Home Depot, Best Buy, Acme Markets, Barnes & Noble, PetSmart, Michaels, Old Navy, Marshalls, DSW, and Home Goods. It also contains a 12-screen United Artists Theater, GameStop, Five Below, Mattress Firm, the Mohegan Lake post office and several restaurants including Wingstop, McDonald's, Applebee's, Panera Bread, Subway, Five Guys, Emperor's Garden, and Mia's Pizza. There are 3 vacant spaces last left by Modell's Sporting Goods, Pier 1 Imports, and Dress Barn.

On March 11, 2020, it was announced that Modell's Sporting Goods would close as part of a plan to close all stores nationwide after filing for Chapter 11 bankruptcy.

On May 19, 2020, it was announced that Pier 1 Imports would be closing as part of a plan to close all locations nationwide.

On January 19, 2023, it was announced that Regal Cinemas would close as part of a plan to close 39 theaters nationwide. A year later, it has yet to close, as of January 2024.
