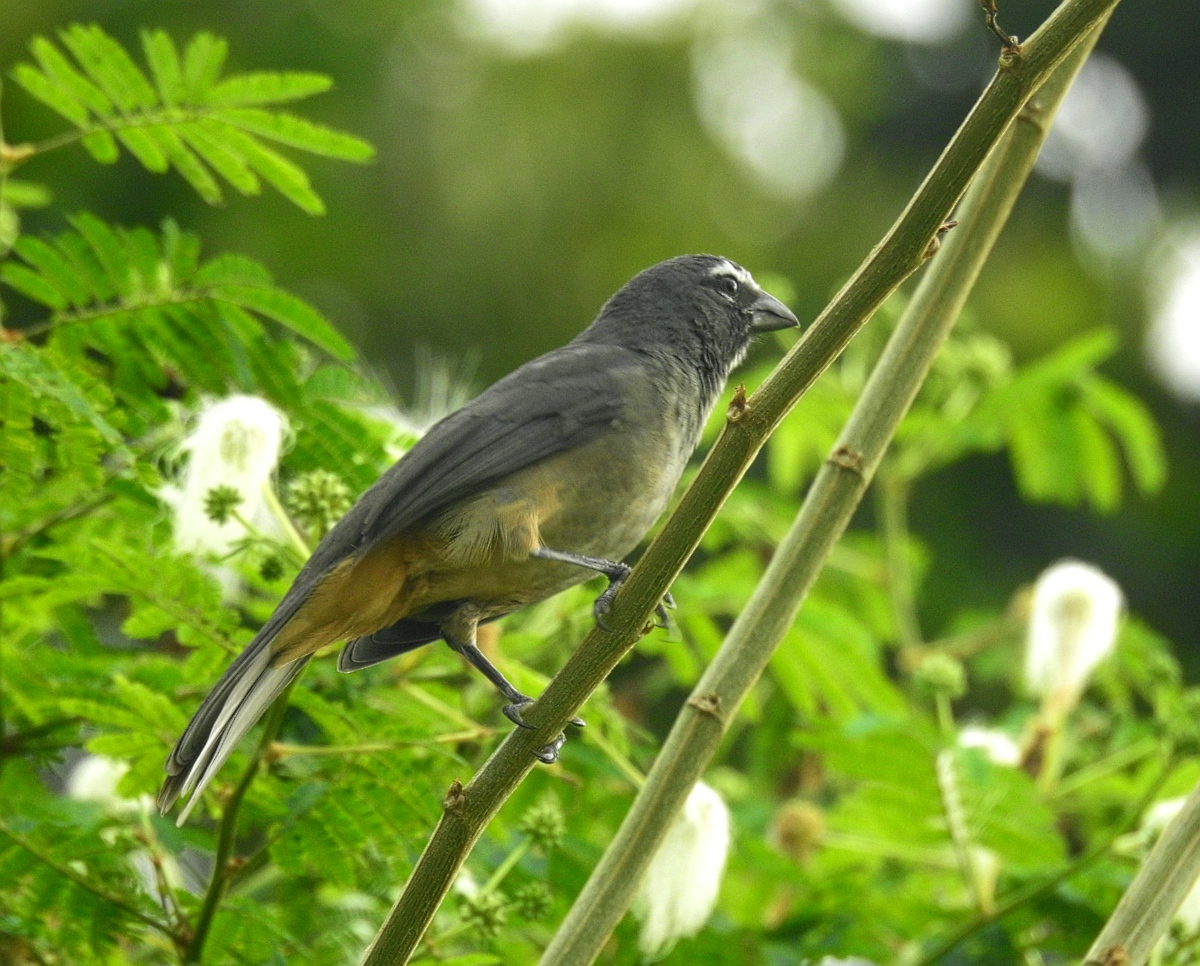
- In Costa Rica

Conservation status
- Least Concern (IUCN 3.1)

Scientific classification
- Kingdom: Animalia
- Phylum: Chordata
- Class: Aves
- Order: Passeriformes
- Family: Thraupidae
- Genus: Saltator
- Species: S. grandis

Binomial name
- Saltator grandis (Deppe, 1830)
- Range in green

= Cinnamon-bellied saltator =

Species of bird

The cinnamon-bellied saltator (Saltator grandis) is a passerine bird in the family Thraupidae, the tanagers and allies. It is found from Mexico to Panama.

== Taxonomy and systematics ==
The cinnamon-bellied saltator has a complicated taxonomic history. It was formally described in 1830 with the binomial Tanagra grandis. By 1938 it had been reassigned to its present genus Saltator. In that year Carl Eduard Hellmayr merged what are now the cinnamon-bellied saltator and many other species and subspecies into S. coerulescens under the English name grey saltator. At the time the genus Saltator was in the subfamily Richmondeninae, the cardinals, within the very large family Fringillidae. By the late twentieth century the cardinals, with Saltator, had been split as the family Cardinalidae. In the mid-2010s taxonomic systems began to move Saltator to its present tanager family Thraupidae. And in the early 2020s systems began splitting S. coerulescens into the cinnamon-bellied, olive-grey (S. olivascens), and bluish-grey (S. coerulescens sensu stricto) saltators.

The cinnamon-bellied saltator has these six subspecies:

- S. g. vigorsii Gray, GR, 1844
- S. g. plumbiceps Baird, SF, 1867
- S. g. grandis (Deppe, 1830)
- S. g. yucatanensis Berlepsch, 1912
- S. g. hesperis Griscom, 1930
- S. g. brevicaudus Van Rossem, 1931

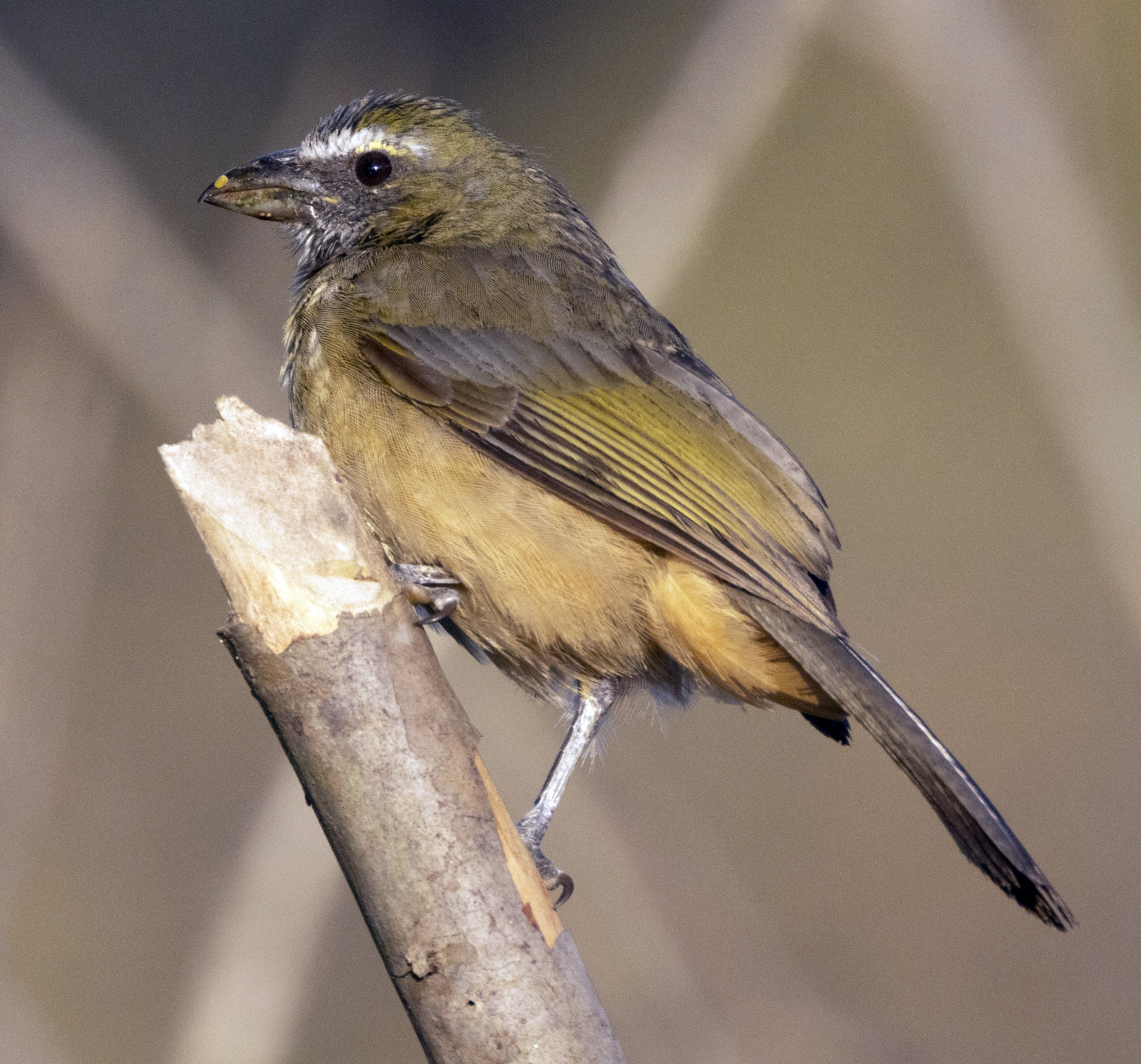
S. g. vigorsii, Cabo Corrientes area, Jalisco, Mexico

== Description ==
The cinnamon-bellied saltator is 22 to 24 cm (8.7 to 9.4 in) long and weighs about 50 to 60 g (1.8 to 2.1 oz). The sexes have the same plumage. Adults of the nominate subspecies S. g. grandis have a mostly deep brownish gray head with a wide white supercilium to beyond the eye. Their crown, nape, upperparts, and wings are deep brownish gray with an olive tinge on the rump and uppertail coverts. Their tail is brown. Their chin and throat are white or pale buffy with a grayish black or dusky stripe on the side. Their breast, sides, and flanks are grayish or grayish olive with a strong buffy tinge on the flanks. Their belly, vent, and undertail coverts are deep buff or cinnamon buff.

The other subspecies of the cinnamon-bellied saltator differ from the nominate and each other thus:

- S. g. vigorsii: somewhat grayer underparts than nominate
- S. g. plumbiceps: ashy gray head, more olive on upperparts than nominate
- S. g. yucatanensis: little different from nominate
- S. g. hesperis: larger than nominate with thinner and shorter supercilium, darker and more slaty upperparts, and much darker and more slaty underparts
- S. g. brevicaudus: smaller than nominate with a shorter tail, shorter supercilium, darker and more plumbeous upperparts with less olive, and darker and grayer underparts

All subspecies have a brown to gray brown iris, a blackish bill, and blackish to leaden gray legs and feet.

== Distribution and habitat ==
The subspecies of the cinnamon-bellied saltator are found thus:

- S. g. vigorsii: northwestern Mexico from southern Sonora south to northern Jalisco
- S. g. plumbiceps western Mexico from central Jalisco south to western Oaxaca
- S. g. grandis: from southern Tamaulipas and eastern San Luis Potosí in northeastern Mexico south on the Gulf/Caribbean slope through Belize, eastern Guatemala, eastern Honduras, and eastern Nicaragua into central Costa Rica (but see below) It bypasses the Yucatán Peninsula.
- S. g. yucatanensis: Yucatán Peninsula and slightly into adjoining eastern Tabasco and northeastern Chiapas
- S. g. hesperis: from Chiapas and eastern Oaxaca in southern Mexico south on the Pacific slope through western Guatemala, El Salvador, and western Honduras into western Nicaragua
- S. g. brevicaudus: around the Gulf of Nicoya in northwestern Costa Rica

Though AviList includes Panama in its description of the species' range, it does not include the country in any of the subspecies' ranges. The Sociedad Audubon de Panamá's list of the country's birds includes it.

The cinnamon-bellied saltator inhabits a wide variety of landscapes "that range from drier, semideciduous or deciduous vegetation (51,35,37,53) to humid evergreen habitats". It is usually found along the forest edges, along watercourses, and in other somewhat open habitats such as plantations, gardens, and urban parks. Overall it generally ranges in elevation from sea level to 1,500 m (4,900 ft). However, it reaches 1,500 m (4,900 ft) in northern Central America between Mexico and Nicaragua and in Costa Rica.

== Behavior ==
=== Movement ===
The cinnamon-bellied saltator is a year-round resident.

=== Feeding ===
The cinnamon-bellied saltator feeds on fruits, other plant material such as flowers and nectar, and insects. It forages singly or in small groups and sometimes joins mixed-species feeding flocks. It forages at all levels of its habitat.

=== Breeding ===
As best as is known, the cinnamon-bellied saltator breeds between April and August throughout its range. Its nest is a large cup made from twigs and leaves and lined with rootlets and plant fibers. It is typically placed between 1.5 and 4 m (5 and 13 ft) above the ground, well-concealed in a shrub or tree. The clutch is two to five eggs; in Mexico and Costa Rica they are bright blue with black markings. The incubation period is not known. One nest fledged its brood 15 days after hatch.

=== Vocalization ===
One description of the cinnamon-bellied saltator's song is "a 3- or 4-part series ending in a long clear upslurring whistle, teeut-peeur-weeeeeeeet!" Another is "a pleasant whistled phrase that ends on a rising note".

== Status ==
The IUCN has assessed the cinnamon-bellied saltator as being of Least Concern. It has a very large range; its population size is not known but is believed to be stable. No immediate threats have been identified. It is considered common in northern Central America. In Costa Rica it is "fairly common in the Central Valley and in sections of [the] Caribbean lowlands; less common on [the] Pacific slope [and] rare around the Gulf of Nicoya". It occurs in protected areas in most of the countries in its range.
