= Electrification of the New York, New Haven and Hartford Railroad =

First single-phase AC railroad electrification

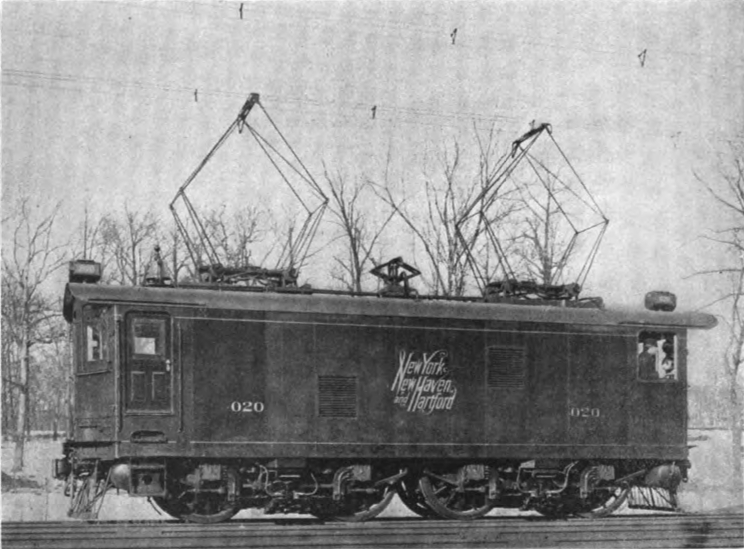
A New Haven EP-1 electric locomotive, circa 1907. Note the small DC pantograph between the two larger AC pantographs.

The New York, New Haven and Hartford Railroad pioneered electrification of main line railroads using high-voltage, alternating current, single-phase overhead catenary. It electrified its mainline between Stamford, Connecticut, and Woodlawn, New York, in 1907 and extended the electrification to New Haven, Connecticut, in 1914. While single-phase AC railroad electrification has become commonplace, the New Haven's system was unprecedented at the time of construction. The significance of this electrification was recognized in 1982 by its designation as a Historic Mechanical Engineering Landmark by the American Society of Mechanical Engineers (ASME).

== Initial experiments ==
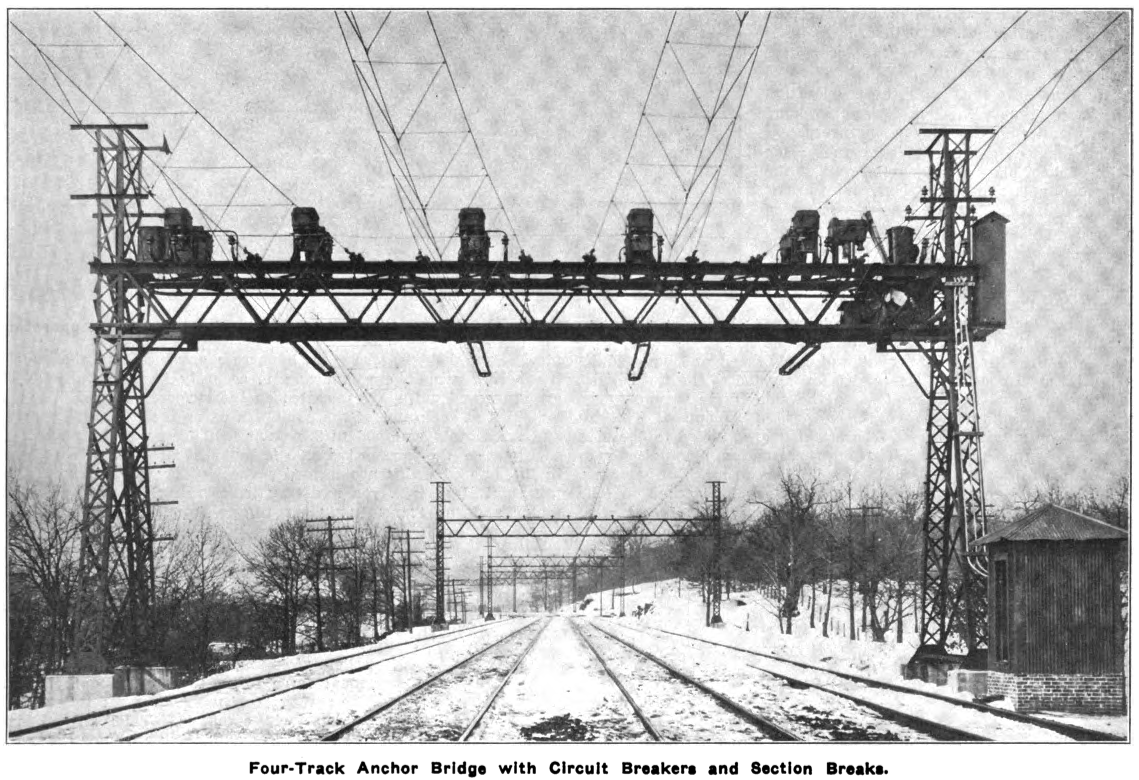

The New Haven tried several experiments with low-voltage DC electrification in the decade preceding their main line overhead electrification. These included:

- 1895 electrification of 6.8 mi (11 km) of line between Nantasket Junction and Pemberton, Massachusetts using overhead copper contact wire at 600-700 Vdc.
- This line was extended an additional 3.4 mi (5.5 km) to East Weymouth around 1896.
- Third-rail electrification between Hartford, New Britain, and Berlin, a total of 12 mi (20 km) in 1896. This third-rail system was unique; it consisted of an inverted V (angle) cross-section rail, mounted on the cross ties between the running rails, and was totally exposed.
- In 1898, the New Canaan Branch was electrified with 500V DC catenary. This was replaced in 1908 with 11kV AC catenary.

The third rail system resulted, not surprisingly, in a number of accidents. It also resulted in a decree from the Connecticut Supreme Court on June 13, 1906 forbidding the use of third rail electrification within the state. The New Haven was forced by this decision to design their main line electrification system using overhead catenary.

Several different systems combinations of voltage and frequency were considered in the initial design. Due to the relatively large distances involved, transmission at high voltages using alternate current was recognized as being unavoidable. An architecture similar to commercial DC utilities and urban railroads was considered using high voltage transmission lines, rotary converters, and overhead DC catenary. The studies of the time assumed an electrical efficiency of only 75 percent for this architecture.

The highest voltage for which generators could be reliably designed at this time was about 22 kV. An intermediate design was considered using 22 kV transmission lines, substations to reduce catenary voltage to between 3 and 6 kV, and transformers on the engines to the 560 V required by the traction motors. The railroad realized that it could save significant capital cost if the intermediate substitution were omitted and locomotives received line voltage at around 11 kV.

== Original 1907 direct-feed architecture ==
Direct-feed architecture implemented in 1907, and schematic of catenary bridge circuit breakers in the 1907 design.

The New Haven's electrification was the first of its kind; no previous railroad had practical experience operating a high voltage distribution system above a steam railroad. Many of the system's ultimate specifications were the result of educated design decisions based on the state of the electrical technology in 1907.

Proposals were obtained from General Electric (GE) and Westinghouse. Both companies submitted a variety of AC and DC schemes, though GE favored DC electrification. But New Haven chose single-phase AC at 11 kV, 25 Hz as proposed by Westinghouse, who had been researching AC electrification of railroads since 1895 and in association with Baldwin supplied Baldwin-Westinghouse locomotives. Later GE also supplied some locomotives.

=== Voltage ===
The designers considered several voltages for the transmission segment of the system including 3–6 kV, 11 kV, and 22 kV. Ultimately, the transmission and catenary systems were combined into a transformerless system, that utilized the same voltage from output of generator to catenary to locomotive pantograph. As 11 kV was the highest voltage that could be obtained directly from the output of the generators of 1907, 11 kV was selected as the transmission and catenary voltage of the system.

=== Frequency ===
The New Haven had considered two different operating frequencies for use in their electrification: 15 Hz, and 25 Hz. Although 15 Hz was desirable from an engineering perspective, as it would afford a reduced motor size, lower inductive losses, and a higher motor power factor, choosing that frequency was viewed by the railroad as akin to a "break in gauge", thus limiting the commercial prospects of their system. 25 Hz had by 1907 already become a commercial standard, and the railroad already operated a number of trolley power houses at 25 Hz and had equipped many of its shops with 25 Hz motors; thus, the railroad selected the 25 Hz standard.

=== Catenary ===
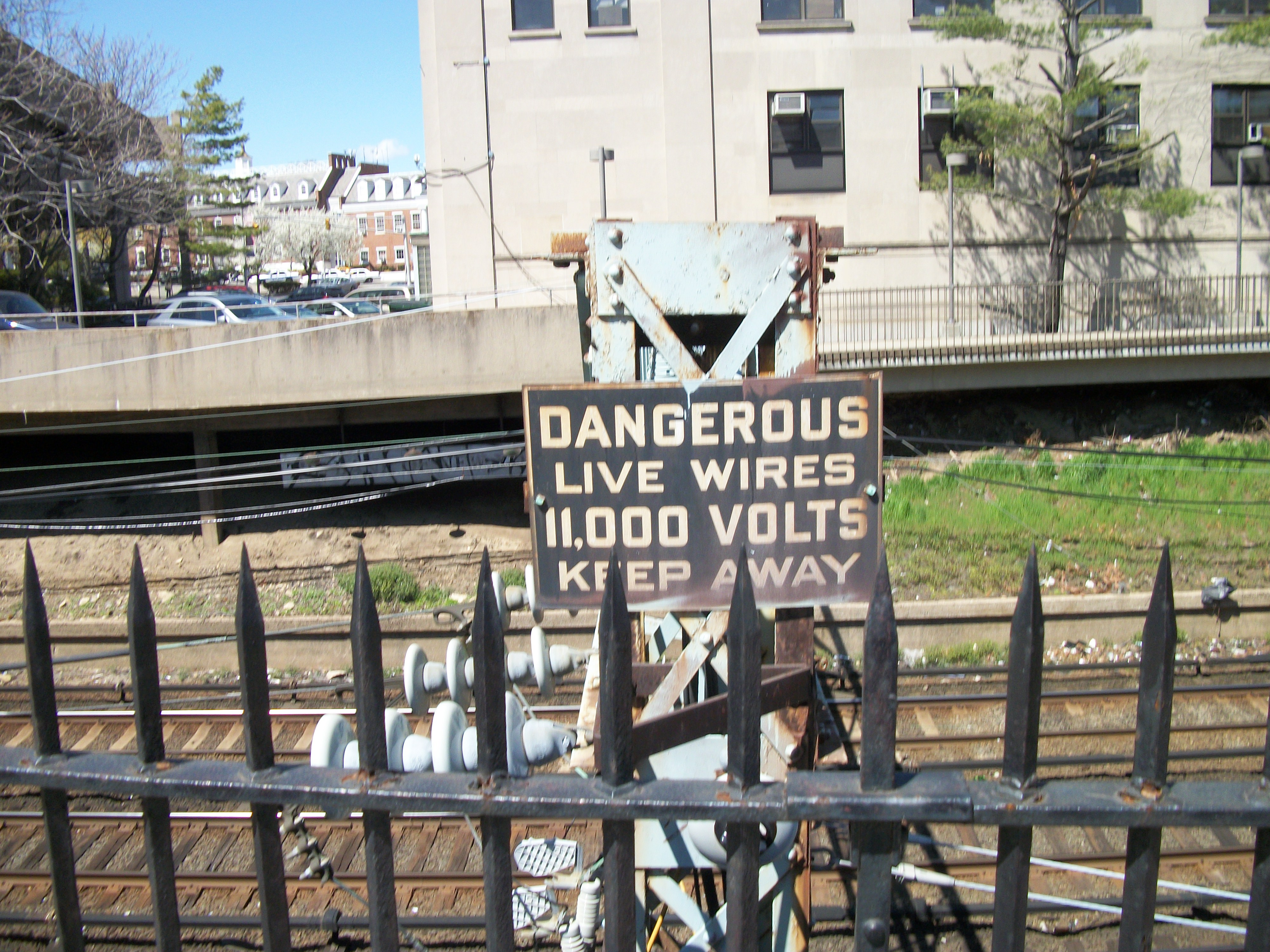
Derelict catenary along the New Haven Railroad main line in Mount Vernon, New York. The segment south of Pelham now uses a third rail.

The New Haven had no precedent to follow when designing its catenary system. Overhead catenary had previously been the domain of trolleys, except for a few three-phase railways in Europe. No prior experience existed with operating high-speed railways with an overhead contact system. The catenary designed by the New Haven was a unique, relatively rigid triangular cross-section.

The triangular cross-section of catenary used in the original electrification was only repeated by one other railway. The London, Brighton and South Coast Railway used a similar triangular catenary from 1909 until 1929. The New Haven's 1914 extensions dispensed with the triangular catenary design.

Catenary support spacing was set at 300 feet (91 m). This was based on keeping the straight line deviation from center of track to within 8.5 inches (220 mm) with a curve radius of 3 degree, which was the tightest curve between the original system's termini at Woodlawn and Stamford.

=== Generators ===
The generators at the Cos Cob Power Station were designed to supply single-phase power directly to the catenary. They were also required to supply three-phase power both to the New Haven itself for use along the lines, and to the New York Central's (NYC) Port Morris generating station to compensate the NYC for the power consumed by New Haven trains on the NYC's third-rail supplied line to Grand Central Terminal. The Cos Cob generators were three-phase machines, but wired to supply both three phase and single phase power simultaneously.

== Revised 1914 autotransformer architecture ==
Diagram of New Haven system following 1914 implementation of autotransformer substations.

Although the railroad considered the 1907 electrification highly successful, two problems required an ultimate redesign of the transmission system. The first was electromagnetic interference in adjacent, parallel telegraph and telephone wires caused by the high currents in the traction power system.

The second was that the system's geographic growth and the evolving state of electrical technology created a need for higher transmission voltages. The railroad could have simply raised the operating voltage of the entire system, however this would have required all the catenary insulators to be upgraded to withstand a higher potential, and replacement of all the locomotive high voltage equipment. And while higher transmission voltages had become common in the seven years since the initial electrification, generators were still limited by economics to a maximum output voltage of around 11 kV.

The solution decided upon by the railroad, after several years of study, was a balanced autotransformer system.

Remarkably, the railroad changed transmission system architectures within four hours, although preliminary work had taken the preceding 18 months. On Sunday, January 25, 1914, the railroad shut down the entire power system at 2 am. Gangs of workers throughout the system reconfigured the transmission lines over the next 70 minutes. System startup was commenced and by 5:30 am, electric trains were running over the new, autotransformer supplied system.

== Substations ==
Schematic of catenary bridge circuit breakers and autotransformer after 1914 upgrade.

New York, New Haven, and Hartford Electrification System Substations
Substation No.	Catenary Bridge No.	Name	Built	Coordinates	Comments
New Haven Line
	1114	Cedar Hill			
	1104	Mill River (Section Break)			
	1060	Cedar St.		41.2937°N 72.9305°W	
	962	Woodmont			
	863	Devon			
	814	Bishop Ave			
	736	Burr Road			
	633	Green's Farms			
	524	South Norwalk			
	465	Darien		41.0773°N 73.4686°W	
	374	Stamford			
	296	Greenwich			
	245	Port Chester		41.0053°N 73.6559°W	
	193	Rye			
	126	Mamaroneck		40.9467°N 73.7446°W	
SS22	72	New Rochelle	1914	40.9127°N 73.7826°W	Converted to 60 Hz c. 1986
	0	Woodlawn			
Hell Gate Line
ATK 47	211H	Amtrak New Rochelle	1987	40.9069°N 73.7900°W	
SS14	149H	Baychester/Pelham Bridge	1914–1987		
SS12	139H	Westchester/Pelham Parallel	1914–1987	40.8167°N 73.8933°W	
ATK 46		Amtrak Van Nest	1987	40.8420°N 73.8633°W	
SS8	84H	West Farms Junction	1914-1987.	40.8347°N 73.8794°W	Supplied from Sherman Creek; later from Con Ed Hell Gate GS. The substation and adjacent passenger station have been demolished; an impound lot occupies the site.
SS4	58H	Oak Point	1914–1987	40.8075°N 73.9049°W	
SS3	42H	Bungay St	1914?-1987		NH 3ph power supplied to NYC's Port Morris GS to compensate for NH's consumption on NYC DC lines.
SS1	2H	Harlem River	1914-19??		
New York, Westchester and Boston Railway
		Columbus Ave Mt Vernon			
		White Plains			
New York Connecting Railroad
ATK 45	C68	Bowery Bay	1918	40.7643°N 73.9054°W	
Long Island Rail Road Bay Ridge Branch
55		Fresh Pond	1927-19??		
		2 East New York (FC)	1927-19??		Connects the single phase to/from PT&T/LIRR's 3 phase 25 Hz.
54		East New York Swg.	1927-19??		
53		New Lots Ave	1927-19??		
52		Manhattan Beach	1927-19??		
51		4th Ave Bay Ridge	1927-19??		

== Hell Gate Line ==
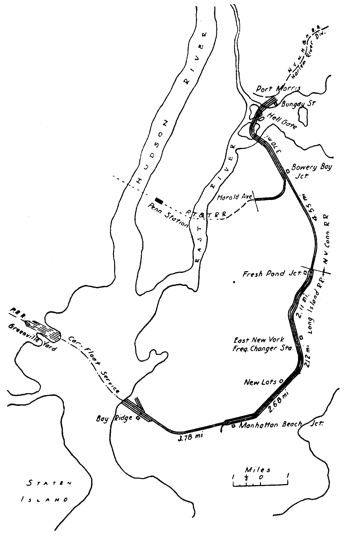
Map showing substation locations along the New York Connecting Railroad.

Schematic of the New Lots Substation along the New York Connecting Railroad.

The New Haven's system was extended across the Hell Gate Bridge to the New York Connecting Railroad upon the construction of the Hell Gate Line. The system of electrification was an extension of the New Haven's revised 11/22 kV autotransformer architecture. The original electrification extended from the New Haven's main line, across the Hell Gate Bridge, to the Bay Ridge yard. The line south of Bowery Bay Junction was de-electrified in the 1950s. The line between New Rochelle and the Harold Interlocking was transferred to Amtrak in 1976 upon dissolution of Penn Central. The electrification system continued to be controlled as a portion of the ex-New Haven system until the 1987 conversion to 60 Hz operation.

When the New Haven main line was converted by Metro-North to 60 Hz operation, the Amtrak section of the Hell Gate Line was also converted, but as an isolated system powered from the Van Nest substation. Control of the catenary system was transferred from Cos Cob to the Load Dispatcher at New York Penn Station. Although conversion occurred subsequent to the PRR-era electrification, Amtrak substation numbers 45–47 were assigned for consistency with the rest of the PRR numbering scheme.

== Electrification extension to Boston ==
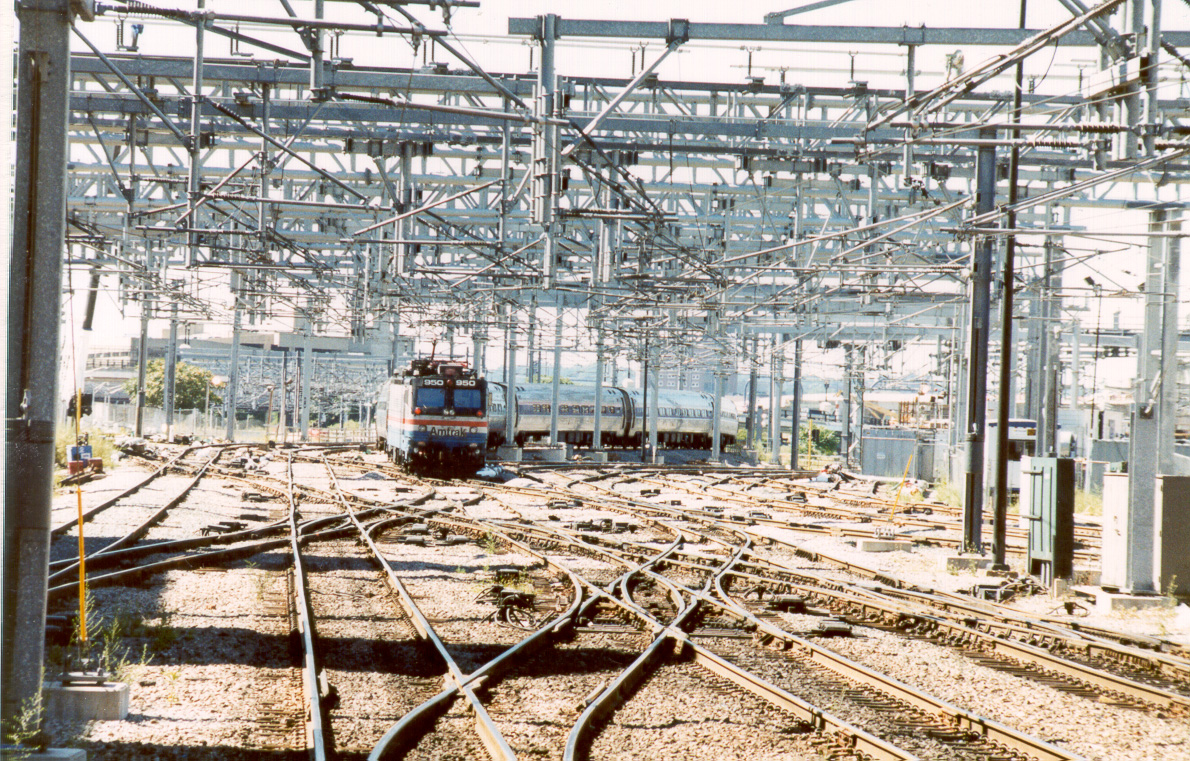
An AEM-7 electric locomotive brings an Amtrak train into South Station, Boston, in 2001

Since 2000, Amtrak’s 60 Hz traction power system extends electrification along the Northeast Corridor between New Haven (Note: Specifically, Amtrak's 25 kV system begins at the Mill River Interlocking about two miles north of New Haven Union Station 41.311281°N 72.911775°W) and Boston, Massachusetts. This system was built by Amtrak in the late 1990s and supplies locomotives with power from an overhead catenary system at 25 kV alternating current at 60 Hz, the standard frequency in North America. Its construction allowed all-electric passenger trains to operate the entire way between Washington, D.C. and Boston, completing the project begun in 1907 and eliminated a lengthy stop at New Haven station for locomotive changes.

== See also ==
- Amtrak's 25 Hz Traction Power System Built by PRR about two decades after New Haven's
- Amtrak's 60 Hz Traction Power System Amtrak's system east of New Haven.
- Baldwin-Westinghouse electric locomotives
- Metro-North Railroad Inherited the system in 1983 from Conrail, which in turn had received it in 1976 from the bankrupt Penn Central.
- Railroad electrification in the United States
- SEPTA's 25 Hz Traction Power System Another 1930s era electrification
