= Amtrak's 25 Hz traction power system =

Railroad power system

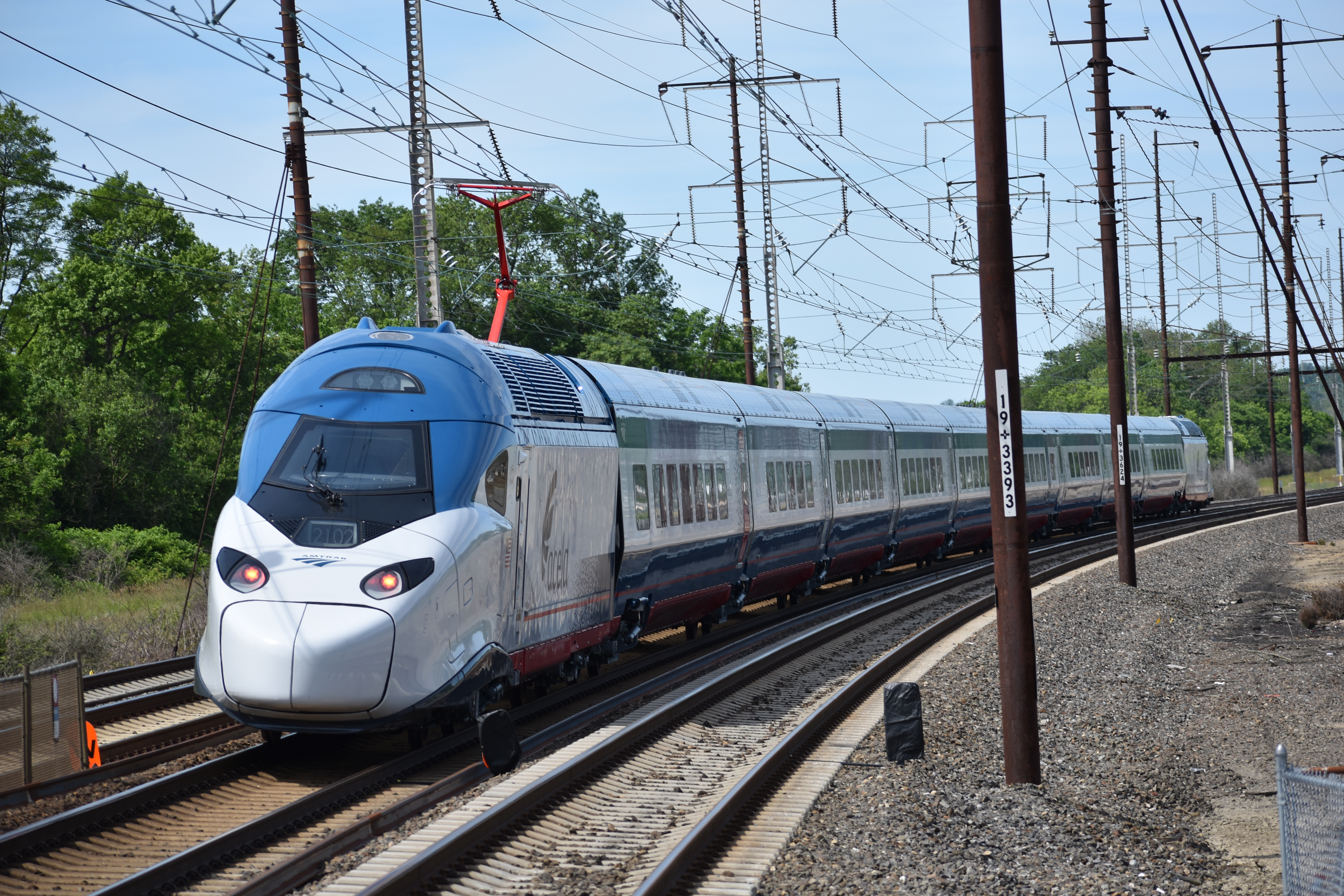
Amtrak Avelia Liberty trainset operating under the 25 Hz traction power system near Claymont, Delaware

The traction power network of Amtrak uses 25 Hz for the southern portion of the Northeast Corridor (NEC), the Keystone Corridor, and several branch lines between New York City and Washington D.C. The system was constructed by the Pennsylvania Railroad between 1915 and 1938 before the North American power transmission grid was fully established, which is why the system's frequency is 25 Hz, as opposed to 60 Hz, which became the standard for power transmission in North America. The system is also known as the Southend Electrification, in contrast to Amtrak's 60 Hz traction power system that runs between Boston and New Haven, which is known as the Northend Electrification system.

In 1976, Amtrak inherited the system from Penn Central, the successor to the Pennsylvania Railroad, along with the rest of the NEC infrastructure.

Only about half of the system's electrical capacity is used by Amtrak; the remainder is sold to the regional railroads that operate their trains along the corridor, including NJ Transit, SEPTA and MARC.

The system powers 226.6 miles (364.7 km) of the NEC between New York City (Note: The 25 Hz system continues through New York Penn Station and Sunnyside Yard. The system ends at a dead section in Queens, 0.4 miles (0.64 km) north of GATE interlocking at Bowery Bay substation, between catenary poles C-66 and C-70. Amtrak operates a short section of 60 Hz catenary between there and just south of New Rochelle (Metro-North's SHELL Interlocking) 40.7641°N 73.9054°W.) and Washington, D.C., (Note: The south end of the electrification is sufficiently far into Washington's 1st Street tunnel to allow electrics arriving with a southbound train to cut off and return north.) the entire 104-mile (167 km) Keystone Corridor, a portion of NJ Transit's North Jersey Coast Line (between the NEC and Matawan), along with the entirety of SEPTA's Airport, Chestnut Hill West, Cynwyd, and Media/Wawa lines.

== History ==
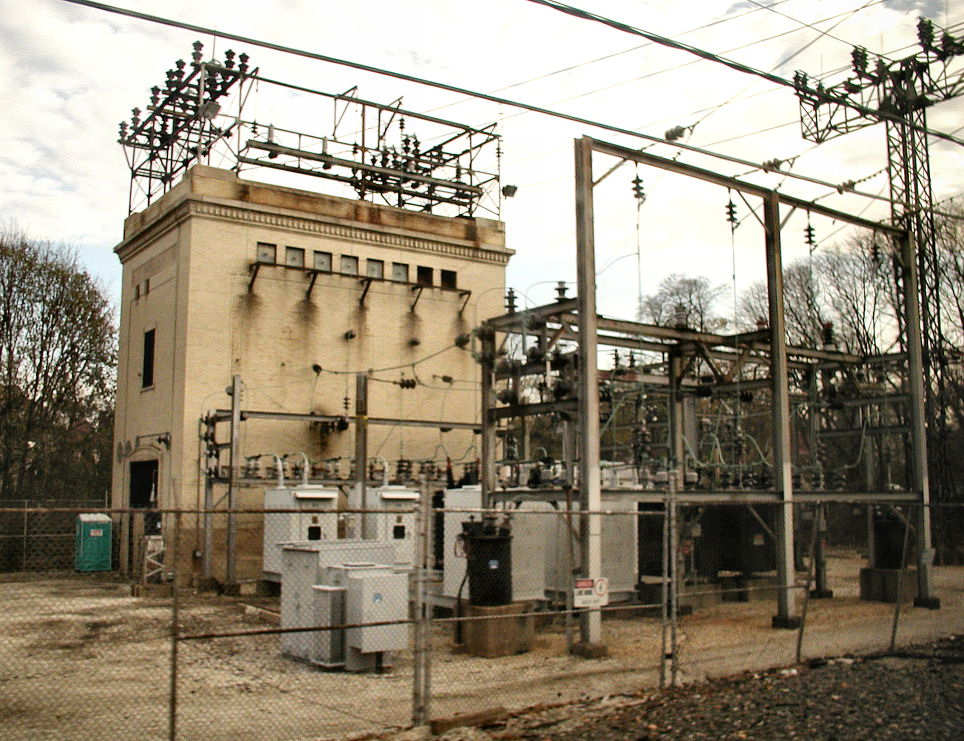
Old substation built for the 1915 electrification project at Bryn Mawr, Pennsylvania. Outdoor yard is an addition.

The Pennsylvania Railroad (PRR) began experimenting with electric traction in 1910, coincident with their completion of the trans-Hudson tunnels and New York Penn Station. These initial systems were low-voltage direct current (DC) third rail systems. While they performed adequately for tunnel service, the PRR ultimately found it inadequate for long-distance, high-speed electrification.

Other railroads had, by this time, experimented with low frequency (less than 60 Hz) alternating current (AC) systems. These low-frequency systems had the AC advantage of higher transmission voltages, reducing resistive losses over long distances, as well as the typically DC advantage of easy motor control as universal motors could be employed with transformer tap changer control gear. Pantograph contact with trolley wire is also more tolerant of high speeds and variations in track geometry. The New York, New Haven and Hartford Railroad had already electrified a portion of its Main Line in 1908 at 11 kV 25 Hz AC and this served as a template for the PRR, which installed its own trial main line electrification between Philadelphia and Paoli, Pennsylvania in 1915. Power was transmitted along the tops of the catenary supports using four single phase, two wire 44 kV distribution circuits. Tests on the line using experimental electric locomotives such as the PRR FF1 revealed that the 44 kV distribution lines would be insufficient for heavier loads over longer distances.

In the 1920s, the PRR decided to electrify major portions of its eastern rail network and, because a commercial electric grid did not exist at the time, the railroad constructed its own distribution system to transmit power from generating sites to trains, possibly hundreds of miles distant. To accomplish this, the PRR implemented a pioneering system of single-phase high voltage transmission lines at 132 kV, stepped down to the 11 kV at regularly spaced substations along the tracks.

The first line to be electrified using this new system was between Philadelphia and Wilmington, Delaware in the late 1920s. By 1930, catenary extended from Philadelphia to Trenton, New Jersey, by 1933 to New York City, and by 1935 south to Washington, D.C. Finally, in 1939, the main line from Paoli west to Harrisburg was completed along with several freight-only lines. Also included were the Trenton Cutoff and the Port Road Branch. Superimposed on these electrified lines was an independent power grid delivering 25 Hz current from the point of generation to electric locomotives anywhere on nearly 500 route miles (800 km) of track, all under the control of electric power dispatchers in Harrisburg, Baltimore, Philadelphia and New York City.

Northeast railroads atrophied in the years following World War II; the PRR was no exception. The infrastructure of the Northeast Corridor remained essentially unchanged through the series of mergers and bankruptcies, which ended in Amtrak's creation and acquisition of the former PRR lines, which came to be known as the Northeast Corridor. The circa 1976 Northeast Corridor Improvement Project had originally planned to convert the PRR's system to the utility grid standard of 60 Hz. Ultimately, this plan was shelved as economically unfeasible, and the electrical traction infrastructure was left largely unchanged with the exception of a general traction power voltage increase to 12 kV and a corresponding transmission voltage increase to 138 kV.

During the 1970s, several of the original converter or power stations that originally supplied power to the system were shut down. Also, the end of electrified through-freight service on the Main Line to Paoli allowed the original 1915 substations and their 44 kV distribution lines to be decommissioned with that 20-mile (32 km) section of track being fed from 1930s-era substations on either end. Between 1992 and 2002, several static converter stations were commissioned to replace stations that had or were being shut down. Jericho Park, Richmond, and Sunnyside Yard converters were all installed during this period. This replaced much of the electrical frequency conversion equipment, but the lineside transmission and distribution equipment were unchanged.

In 2003, Amtrak commenced a capital improvement plan that involved planned replacement of much of the lineside network, including 138/12 kV transformers, circuit breakers, and catenary wire. Statistically, this capital improvement has resulted in significantly fewer delays, although dramatic system shutdowns have still occurred.

== Specifications and statistics ==
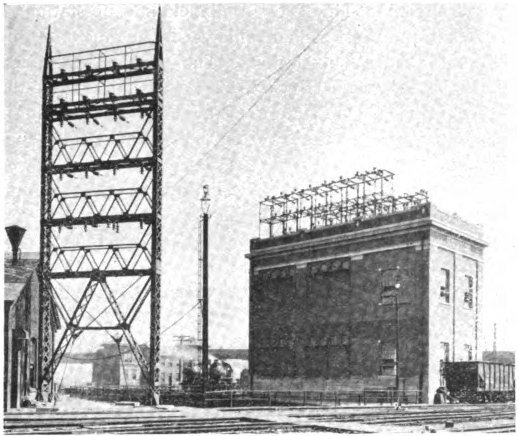
West Philadelphia substation 1915

The 25 Hz system was built by the Pennsylvania Railroad with a nominal voltage of 11 kV. The nominal operating voltages were raised in 1948 and are now:

- Catenary (Traction) Voltage: 12 kV
- Transmission Voltage: 138 kV
- Signal Power:
  - 2.2 kV 91 2/3 Hz – NY Penn Area. 60 Hz used 1910–1931. 100 Hz installed but quickly changed to avoid interference caused by simultaneous AC and DC electrification
  - 3.3 kV 100 Hz – Paoli/Chestnut Hill. 60 Hz used 1915/18–1930
  - 6.9 kV 91 2/3 Hz – all electrification work from 1930 onward

As of 1997, the system included 951 miles (1,530 km) of 138 kV transmission lines, 55 substations, 147 transformers, and 1,104 miles (1,777 km) of 12 kV catenary.

Over 550 GWh of energy is consumed annually by locomotives on the system. If this were consumed at a constant rate over the entire year (although it is not in practice), the average system load would be approximately 63 MW.

The system power factor varies between 0.75 and around 0.85.

== Power sources ==
Electrical power originates at seven generation facilities or traction current converter plants. The nameplate capacity of all the power sources in the system is about 354 MW. The instantaneous peak loading on the system is 210–220 MW (as of c. 2009) during the morning rush hour and up to 225 MW during the afternoon. Peak load has risen significantly over time. In 1997, the peak load was 148 MW.

Regardless of the source, all converter and generator plants supply power to the transmission system at 138 kV, 25 Hz, single-phase, using two wires. Typically, at least two separate 138 kV circuits follow each right of way to supply the line-side substations.

Currently, the following converter and generating plants are operable, although all are rarely in operation simultaneously due to maintenance shutdowns and overhauls:

| Location | Capacity (MW) | In service | Comments |
|---|---|---|---|
| Sunnyside Yard | 30 | 1996 | Static inverter |
| Metuchen | 25 | 1933 | Motor–generator |
| Metuchen | 60 | 2017 | Static inverter |
| Richmond | 180 | 2002 | Static inverter |
| Lamokin | 48 | 1928 | 3 motor–generators |
| Safe Harbor Dam | 81 | 1938 | 2 water turbines; 1 motor–generator |
| Jericho Park | 20 | 1992 | Static cycloconverter |
| System total capacity | 354 | | |

Several types of equipment are currently in operation: static inverters, motor–generators (sometimes called rotary frequency converters), water turbines (hydroelectric generators) and a static cycloconverter.

=== Hydroelectric generators ===
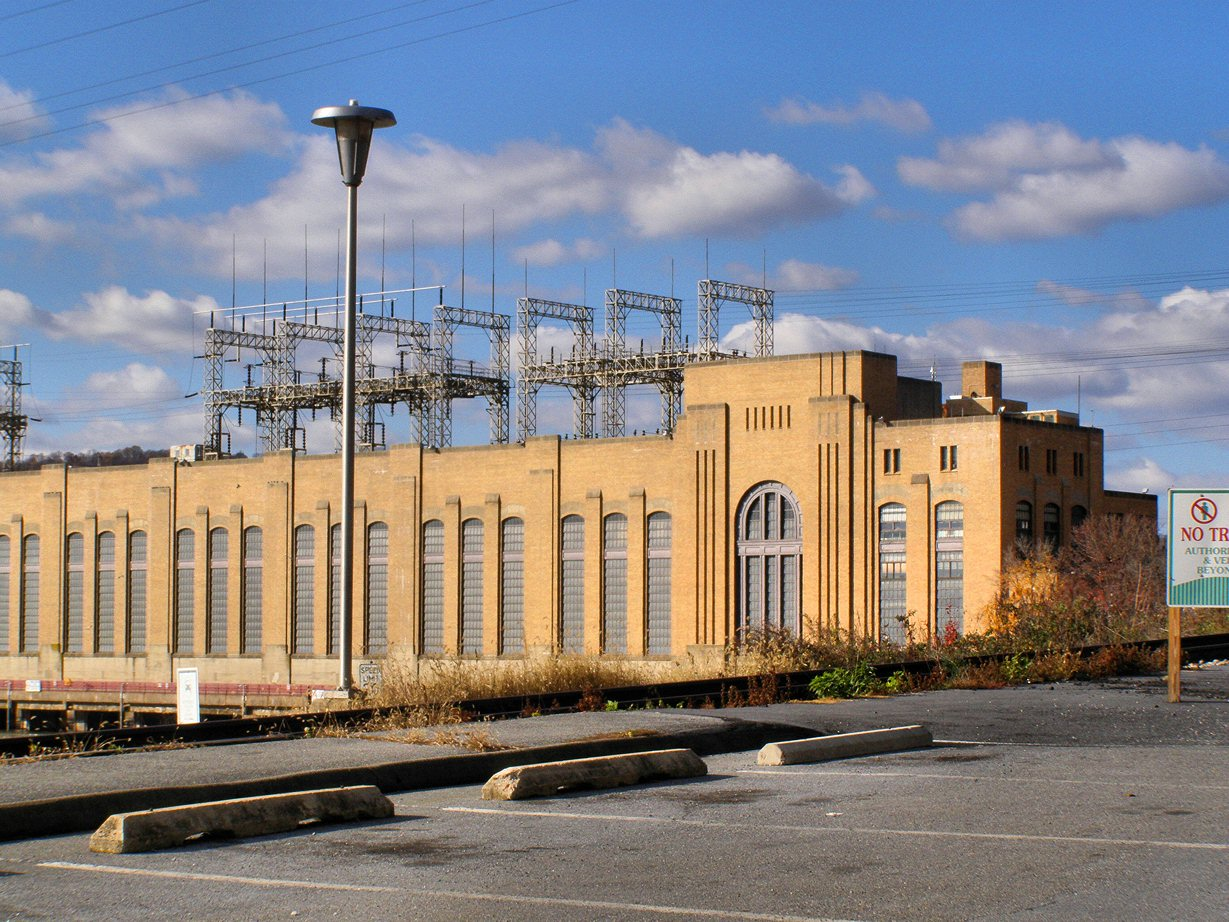
The Safe Harbor Dam generates 25 Hz railroad power via two turbines in the east end of the turbine hall and an M-G set outside against the Dam face.

- Safe Harbor Dam, PA – The Safe Harbor Dam has two 28 MW single-phase turbines dedicated to 25 Hz power generation. A 25 MW bi-directional motor–generator-type frequency converter is also installed. The total 25 Hz capacity of the dam is 81 MW. Power from Safe Harbor is transmitted via the Conestoga substation to Royalton, Pennsylvania, Parkesburg, Pennsylvania (two circuits), and Perryville, Maryland (four circuits), where it is fed into the lineside 138 kV network.

The 25 Hz turbines at the dam are scheduled by Amtrak but operated by Safe Harbor Water Power Company. Like other hydroelectric plants, it has excellent black start capability which was most recently demonstrated during a 2006 blackout. After a cascade shutdown of converters had left the network de-energized, it was recovered using Safe Harbor's generators, and the other converters were subsequently brought back online.

During the twelve-month period ending August 2009, Safe Harbor supplied about 133 GWh of energy to the Amtrak substation at Perryville. Typically, two-thirds of the Safe Harbor output is routed through Perryville, the remainder being sent through Harrisburg or Parkesburg. This suggests that Safe Harbor supplies around 200 GWh of energy annually into the 25 Hz network.

=== Motor–generators (rotary frequency converters) ===
Motor–generators and steam turbine generators were the original power sources on the PRR traction power network. The last steam turbine shut down in 1954, but some of the original motor–generators remain. Although the converting machines are frequently called 'rotary converters' or 'rotary frequency converters', they are not the rotary converter used frequently by subways to convert low-frequency alternating current to DC power. The converters used are more precisely described as motor–generators and consist of two synchronous AC machines on a common shaft with different ratios of poles; they are not electrically connected as in a true rotary converter.

Principal advantages of motor–generators include very high fault current ratings and clean output current. Solid-state electronics can be damaged very quickly, so the microprocessor control systems react very quickly to over-correct conditions to place the converter in a safe, idle mode or to trip the output circuit breaker. Motor–generators, being of 1930s design, are heavily overbuilt. These rugged machines can absorb large load transients and demanding fault conditions while continuing to remain online. Their output waveform is also perfectly sinusoidal without noise or higher harmonic output. They can actually absorb harmonic noise produced by solid-state devices, effectively serving as a filter. These attributes, combined with their high fault-current capability, make them desirable in a stabilizing role within the power system. Amtrak has retained two of the original converter plants and plans to overhaul them and continue their operation indefinitely.

Disadvantages of motor–generators include lower efficiency, generally between 83% (lightly loaded machine) and 92% (fully loaded machine). In comparison, cycloconverter efficiency can exceed 95%. Also, motor–generators require more routine maintenance due to their nature as rotating machines, given the bearings and slip rings. Today, the outright replacement of motor–generators would also be difficult due to the high manufacturing cost and limited demand for these large 25 Hz machines.

- Metuchen, NJ – 25 MW Motor–generator. Upgrades to transmission lines and circuit breakers are planned for 2010. 40.530743°N 74.347281°W
- Lamokin (Chester), Pennsylvania – The Lamokin plant was built in the 1920s and has a net capacity of 48 MW and consists of three 16 MW motor–generators. All three units will be overhauled, including re-winding of rotors and stators, and replacement of slip ring assemblies. Associated breakers and cables are also planned for replacement. 39.843241°N 75.377225°W

=== Static inverters and cycloconverter ===
The static converters in the system were commissioned during the decade between 1992 and around 2002. Static converters use high-power solid-state electronics with few moving parts. Chief advantages of static converters over motor–generators include lower capital cost, lower operating costs, and higher conversion efficiency. The Jericho Park converter exceeds its efficiency design criteria of 95%. Major disadvantages of solid-state converters include harmonic frequency generation on both the 25 Hz and 60 Hz sides, and lower overload capability.

- Sunnyside Yard (Long Island City), NY – Static Inverter rated at 30 MW ordered from ABB in 1993 for $27 million. This converter is operated by Amtrak and generally runs at low continuous loading to provide peaking and reactive power support to the New York area. 40.750499°N 73.921753°W
- Richmond (Philadelphia), PA – The Richmond Static Converter plant consists of five 36 MW modules and has a net capacity of 180 MW. It was ordered from Siemens in 1999 for $60 million, and installation was completed around 2002. The plant receives 69 kV, three-phase, 60 Hz power from the PECO Energy Company. Although the exact electrical architecture of the converter modules is unknown, they are presumably of the DC link variety (Rectifier, filtering capacity, and inverter placed back to back) based on other Siemens traction power converters. The 2006 traction network shutdown originated in one of the converter modules at this plant. Richmond output power is scheduled with PECO, although the units themselves are operated by Amtrak remotely from Philadelphia. Generally, the three PECO-supplied converters (Richmond, Metuchen, and Lamokin) are scheduled as a block with PECO. 39°59′1″N 75°4′41″W
- Jericho Park, MD – 20 MW Static Converter. Jericho Park was constructed to replace the capacity lost when BG&E declined to renew the Benning rotary converter contract. BG&E proposed a static converter to replace Benning, and Jericho Park came into service six years later. It consists of two 10 MW cycloconverter modules supplied by GE. 39°0′56″N 76°46′09″W
  Jericho Park was the first solid-state power supply introduced on the Amtrak network. It suffered from some filtering network problems caused by the highly distorted voltage present on the catenary and was ultimately downgraded from its original design capacity of 25 MW to 22 MVA. Amtrak has requested funding to rehabilitate portions of the converter in an ARRA request. During the twelve-month period that ended in August 2009, the Jericho Park converter used about 70 GWh of energy. SEPTA's static converter plant at Wayne Junction is also based on this technology, although it was supplied by a different company; see SEPTA's 25 Hz Traction Power System. 39°0′56″N 76°46′9″W
- Metuchen – In October 2014, Amtrak placed a contract with Siemens for two 30 MW converters to supplement the existing 25 MW motor–generator from 1933. The project was completed in 2017 and forms part of the New Jersey High Speed Rail Improvement Program (NJHSRIP).

== Former converter and power stations ==
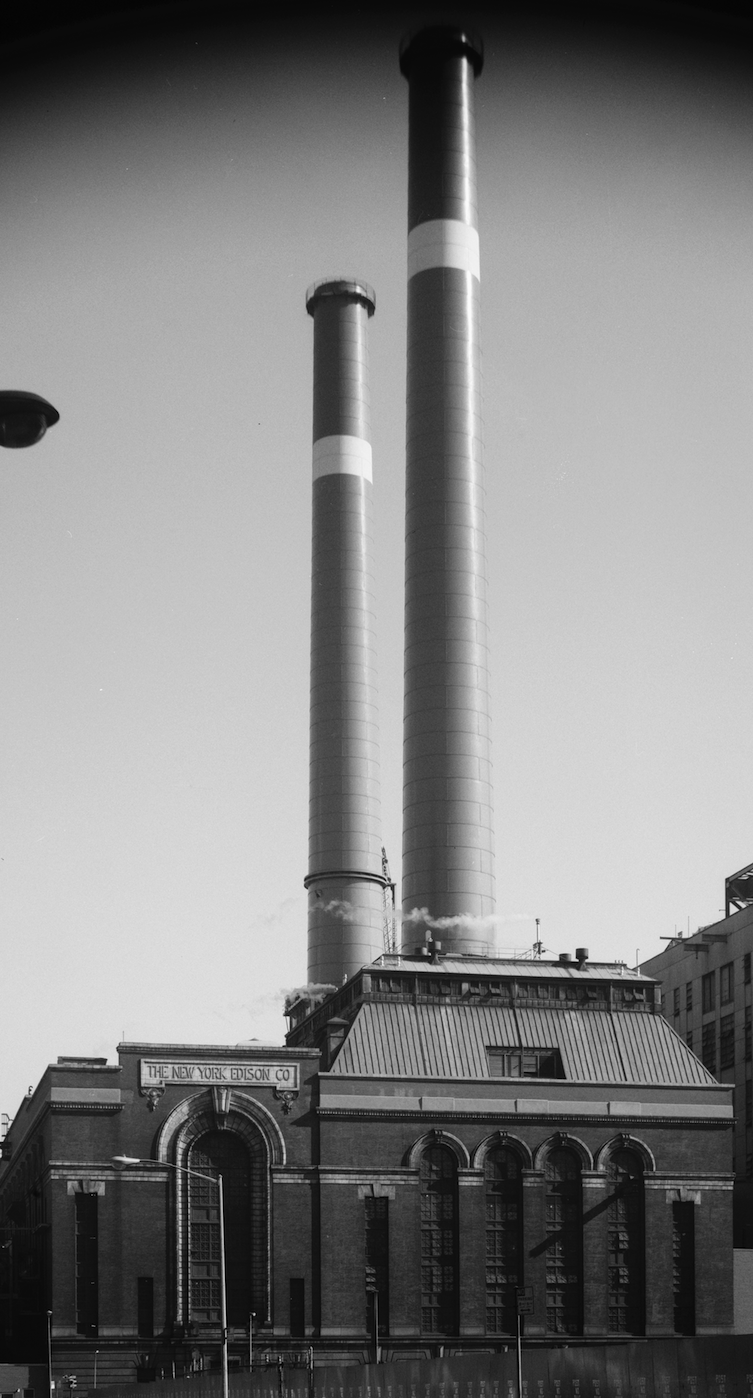
Waterside Power station in Manhattan, New York

The majority of power sources in the original Pennsylvania Railroad electrification were built prior to 1940. Some have been retired outright, others have been replaced with co-located static frequency converters, and others remain in service and will be refurbished and operated indefinitely.

The following tables lists sources which are no longer in service:

| Location | Type (Number) | Capacity (MW) | Dates in Service | Comments |
|---|---|---|---|---|
| Long Island City | Steam turbines (5) | 18 / 32 | 1910–1954 | Three turbines originally, five from c. 1910. 32.5 MW total capacity. |
| Waterside | Steam turbines (3) | 24 | c. 1910–1978 | |
| Richmond | Motor–generators (2) | 60 | 1932–1996 | Replaced with co-located 180 MW Static Frequency Converter |
| Schuylkill | Motor–generator | 18 | 1914–1971 | |
| Somerset | Motor–generator | 18 | c. 1933–c. 1990s | Demolished circa 2011. Power at 13 kV, single phase, 25 Hz, ran from four switches at NE corner of building NE along Trenton Ave and connecting rail line to Frankford Junction, where they ran along Delair Branch to Richmond Sub 31. Also supplied Reading Railroad system via Wayne Junction. Transmission lines have also been removed. 39°59′11″N 75°07′04″W |
| Benning | Frequency changer | 25 | 1934–1986 | Operating contract expired. |
| Radnor | Synchronous condensers | N/A | 1917–c. 1930 | Power factor correction and voltage regulation |

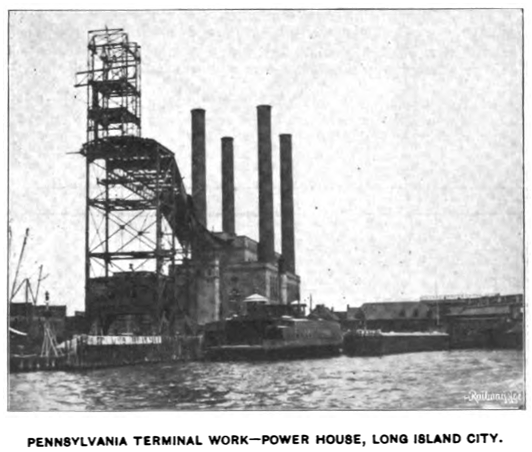
Long Island City Power Plant under construction in New York in 1905

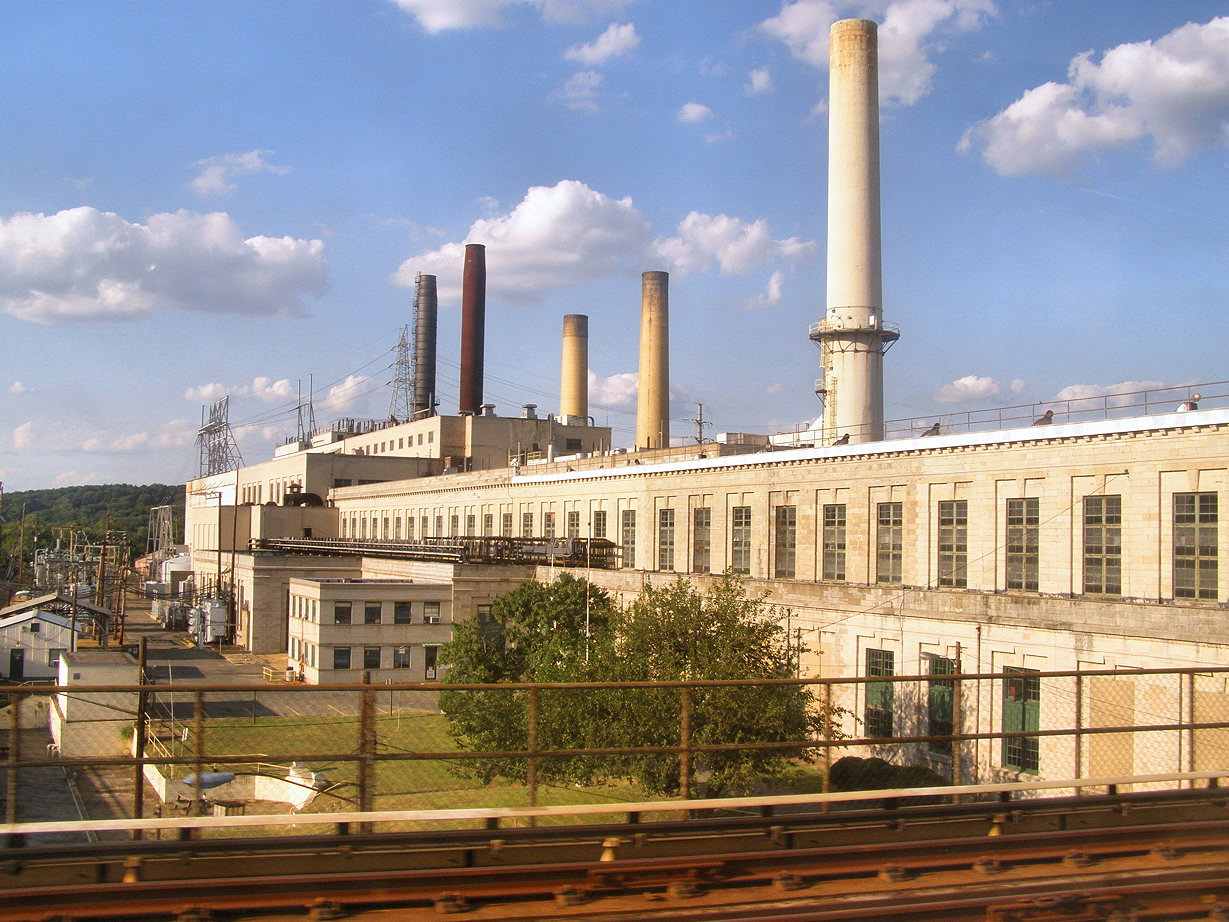
The Pepco Benning Road power station in Washington, D.C., supplied 25 MVA of 25 Hz power via a rotary frequency changer in the hall nearest the Metro tracks from 1935 until 1986.

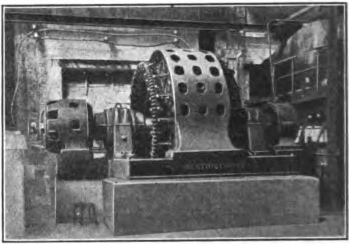
A picture of one of the 1916 Radnor Synchronous Condensers from Electrical World

=== Declining need for 25 Hz power ===
During the beginning of the 20th century, 25 Hz power was much more readily available from commercial electrical utilities. The vast majority of urban subway systems used 25 Hz power to supply their lineside rotary converters used to generate the DC voltage supplied to the trains. Since rotary converters work more efficiently with lower-frequency supplies, 25 Hz was a common supply frequency for these machines. Rotary converters have been steadily replaced over the past 70 years with, at first, mercury arc rectifiers and, more recently, solid-state rectifiers. Thus, the need for special frequency power for urban traction has disappeared, along with the financial motivation for utilities to operate generators at these frequencies.

=== Long Island City Generating Station ===
Long Island City Power Station in Hunter's Point, NY, was built by the Pennsylvania Railroad in 1906 in preparation for the North River Tunnels and the opening of Pennsylvania Station in Manhattan. The station consisted of 64 coal-fired boilers and three steam turbine generators with a total capacity of 16 MW. In 1910, the station was expanded with two additional turbine generators for a total capacity of 32.5 MW. Power was transmitted to rotary converters (AC to DC machines) for use in the PRR's original third rail electrification scheme. Like most DC electric distribution systems of the time (Thomas Edison's being the most famous), 25 Hz power was used to drive rotary converters at substations along the line. Some sources state that the station was largely dormant by the 1920s. When AC overhead electrification was extended in the 1930s, Long Island City connected to the 11 kV catenary distribution system. Operation of the station was transferred to Consolidated Edison in 1938, although ConEd began supplying power from the adjacent Waterside Generating Station, most likely due to declining overall demand for 25 Hz power. The station was disused and sold in the mid-1950s. 40.7430°N 73.9581°W

=== Waterside Generating Station ===
Originally constructed by Consolidated Edison to supply power to their DC distribution system in Manhattan, Waterside began supplying power to the PRR's AC system around 1938 when ConEd assumed operation of the Long Island City Station. The single-phase turbine generators were retired in the mid-1970s due to safety concerns. Two transformers were installed to supply catenary power from the remaining (three-phase) portions of ConEd's still relatively extensive 25 Hz system. Power flow management problems prevented usage of this source under other than emergency conditions. 40.7464°N 73.9707°W

=== Benning frequency changer ===
In 1986, Baltimore Gas and Electric elected not to renew the contract under which it had operated the Benning Power Station frequency changer on behalf of Amtrak. They proposed a static frequency changer, which was built at Jericho Park (Bowie, Maryland) and placed on service in the spring of 1992. 38.897534°N 76.959298°W

=== Radnor synchronous condenser ===
Although reactive power has primarily been supplied along with real power by the steam turbines and motor–generators of the system, the PRR briefly used two synchronous condensers. Shortly after commissioning the 1915 electrification, the railroad discovered that the 44 kV feeders and large inductive loads on the system were causing significant voltage sag. The supplying electric utility (Philadelphia Electric) also discovered that power factor correction was needed. In 1917, the PRR installed two 11 kV, 4.5 MVA synchronous converters at Radnor, the approximate center point of the system load. This substation was located at the site of water tanks used to supply water to track pans, which supplied water to conventional steam locomotives. At some later time, the converters were shut down and removed. Dedicated machines for reactive power support have not been used subsequently by either the PRR or Amtrak. 40.044725°N 75.359463°W

== Substations ==
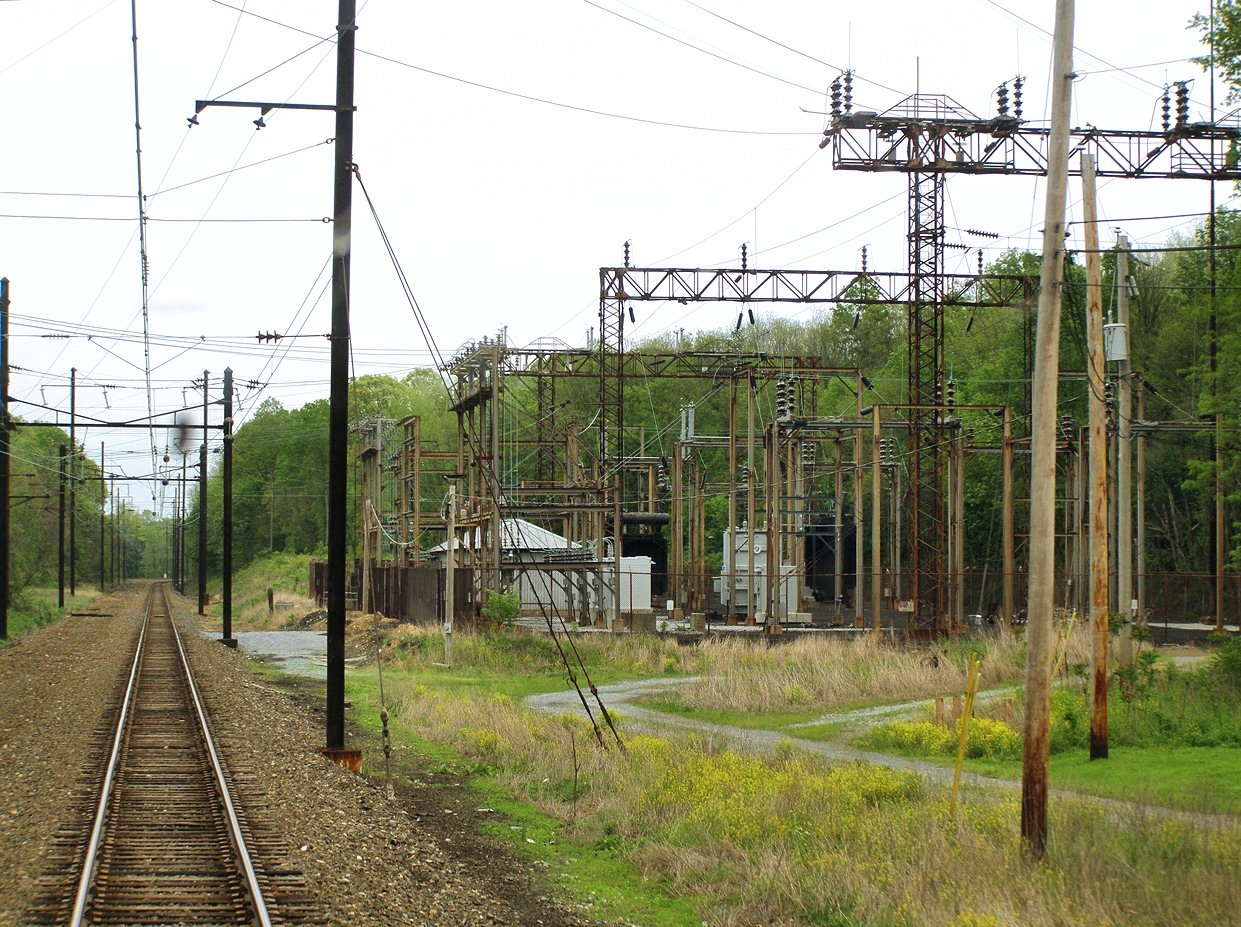
Frazer substation on the Philadelphia to Harrisburg Main Line

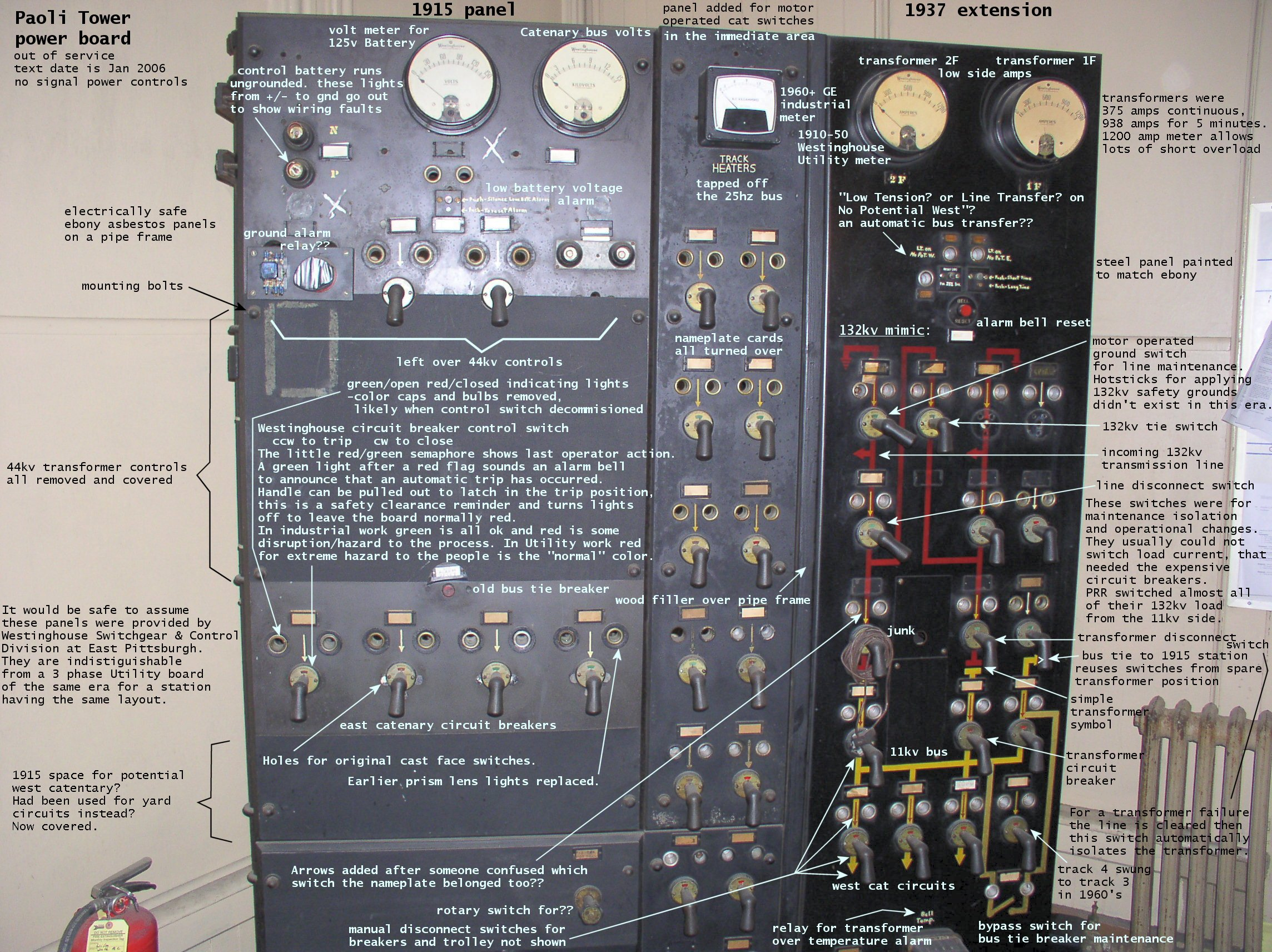
Old substation remote control panel at Paoli interlocking tower

A one-line diagram of the 1930 era substation at Bowie, MD

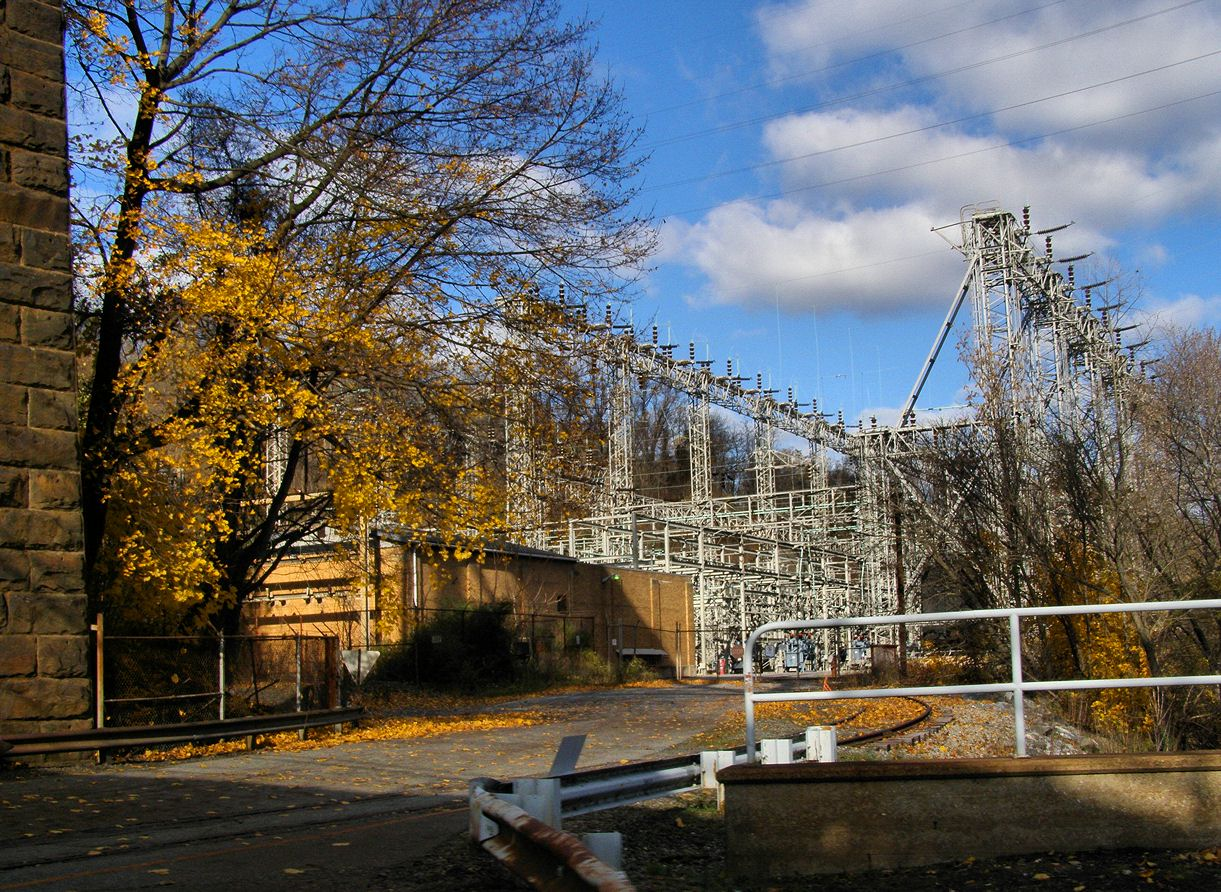
The large substation at the Safe Harbor dam is one of the minority that steps-up 25 Hz power to 138 kV for long distance transmission.

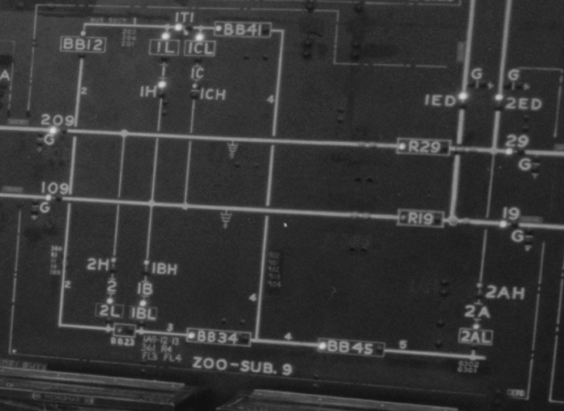
One-line diagram of Zoo Sub 9, circa 1997, on the Load Dispatcher mimic board in Philadelphia

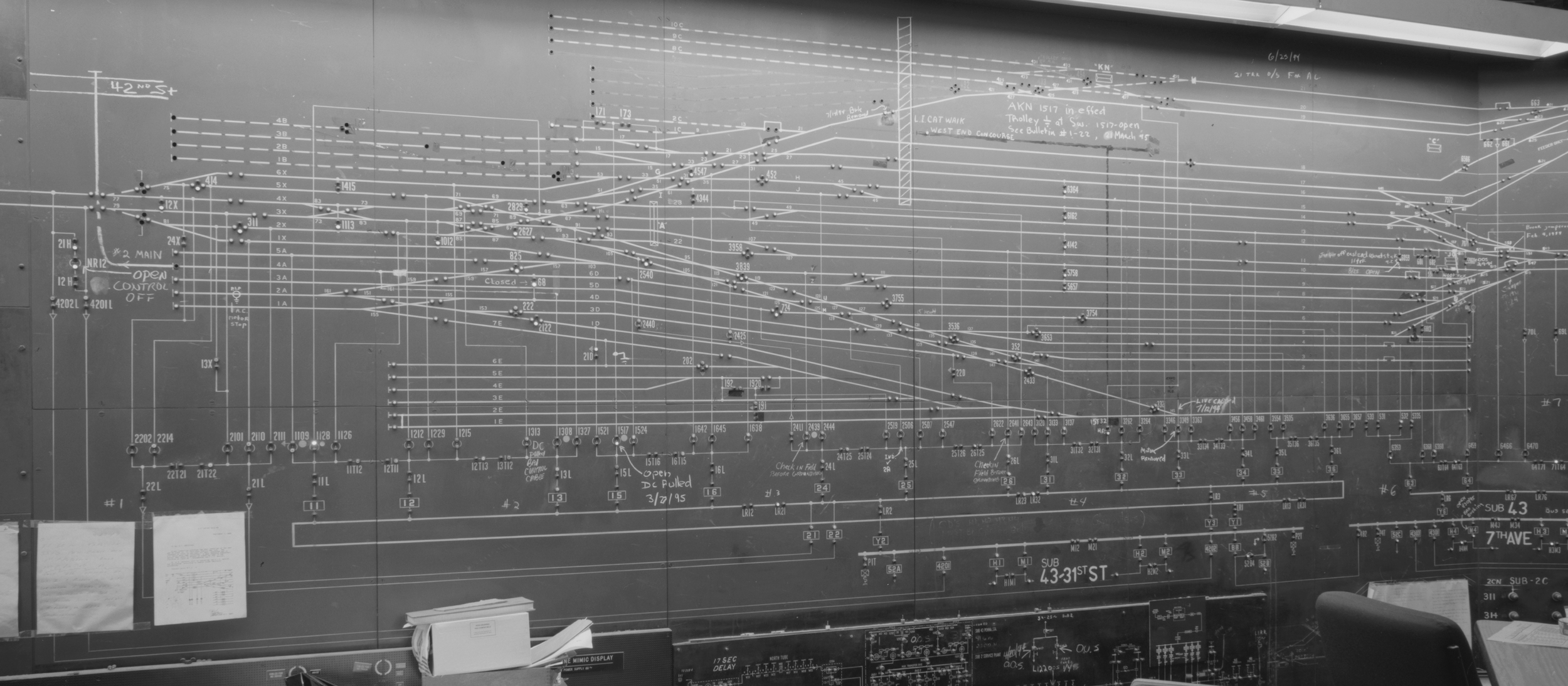
The Power Dispatcher's view of substation 43 (New York City Penn Station)

The PRR's original 1915 electrification made use of four substations at Arsenal Bridge, West Philadelphia, Bryn Mawr, and Paoli. The Arsenal Bridge substation stepped-up 13.2 kV, 25 Hz power supplied from PECO's Schuylkill power station on Christian Street to 44 kV for distribution. The remaining three substations reduced the 44 kV distribution voltage to 11 kV catenary voltage. The substations were operated from adjacent signal towers. They used typical period concrete buildings to house the transformers and switchgear while the line terminals were on the roof. From 1918 onward, outdoor stations were used, and when the main line electrification began in 1928, the stations became large open-air structures using lattice steel frameworks to mount the 132 kV terminations and switchgear. By 1935, new stations were connected to remote supervision systems, allowing power directors to open and close switches and breakers from central offices without having to go through the tower operators.

Today, about 55 substations are part of Amtrak's network. Substations are spaced on average 8 miles (13 km) apart and feed 12 kV catenary circuits in both directions along the line. Thus, the catenary is segmented (via section breaks, also called 'sectionalizations' by the PRR) at each substation, and each substation feeds both sides of a catenary's section break. A train traveling between two substations draws power through both transformers.

A typical substation includes two to four 138/12 kV transformers, 138 kV air switches that permit isolation of individual transformers, shutdown of one of the two 138 kV feeders, or cross-connection from one feeder to another. The output of the transformers is routed to the catenary via 12 kV circuit breakers and air disconnect switches. Cross-connect switches allow one transformer to feed all catenary lines.

The PRR substation architecture was based on a long-distance, high-speed railway. The substation spacing ensures that any train is never more than 4–5 miles (6.4–8.0 km) from the nearest substation, which minimizes voltage drop. One disadvantage to the substation design as originally built by the PRR concerns its lack of 138 kV circuit breakers. Essentially, all segmentation of the 138 kV system must be manually accomplished, making rapid isolation of a fault on the 138 kV line difficult.

Faults in one part of the line also affect the entire distribution system since it is impossible for the 138 kV transmission system to protect or reconfigure itself during a fault condition. High voltage faults generally are cleared by opening converter output breakers, which causes a concurrent loss of the converter. The system does not degrade gracefully under high-voltage faults. Rather than isolating, for example, the south 138 kV feeder between Washington and Perryville, the system would require opening converter output breakers at Jericho Park and Safe Harbor. This results in the loss of much more of the network than is required to simply isolate the fault.

Former Pennsylvania Railroad Substations
| Station Name | Coordinates | Sta. No. | Year Built | Comments |
Early Philadelphia Lines
| West Philadelphia (44 kV) | 39°57′24″N 75°11′08″W | 1 | 1915 | Removed c. 1930 |
| Arsenal (44 kV) | 39°56′46″N 75°11′30″W | 2 | 1915 | 44 kV portions abandoned c. 1930 |
| Bryn Mawr | 40°01′17″N 75°18′51″W | 3 | 1915 | Switching Station only since c. 1960 |
| Radnor SC | 40°02′37″N 75°22′07″W | 5 | 1916 | Two 4.5 MVA Synchronous Condensers. Removed c. 1960 |
| Paoli | 40°02′36″N 75°29′22″W | 4 | 1915 | Station expanded 1938. 44 kV disconnected c. 1960 |
| Greentree Switching | 40°02′27″N 75°30′04″W | -- | 1938 | Removed in 2012. |
| North Philadelphia | 39°59′49″N 75°09′27″W | 6 | 1918 | |
| Allen Lane | 40.062643°N 75.198652°W | 7 | 1918 | Switching Station only since c. 1960. Components replaced 2013 |
| Arsenal (138 kV) Step-Up | 39°56′45″N 75°11′31″W | 2A | 1928 | Step-up capability removed c. 1971 |
| Morton | 39.9073°N 75.3321°W | 01 | 1928 | |
| Lenni | 39°53′38″N 75°26′33″W | 02 | 1928 | |
| Cheyney | 39.92915°N 75.5225°W | 03 | 1928 | Removed between 1965 and 1968 |
| West Chester | 39°57′26″N 75°35′37″W | 04 | 1928 | Removed between 1965 and 1968 |
New York – Philadelphia Main Line
| New Rochelle | 40.9069°N 73.7900°W | 47 | 1907/1987 | Originally 25 Hz; switched to 60 Hz coincident with Metro-North in 1987. No longer supplies Amtrak power. |
| Van Nest | 40.8420°N 73.8633°W | 46 | 1907/1987 | Originally 25 Hz; switched to 60 Hz coincident with Metro North in 1987. Now the supply substation for Amtrak's 60 Hz system between Gate Interlocking and New Rochelle. |
| Bowery Bay | 40.7643°N 73.9054°W | 45 | 1917/1987 | Originally 25 Hz; switched to 60 Hz coincident with Metro North in 1987. Switching only. Section break between 25 Hz and 60 Hz systems. |
| Sunnyside | 40.747341°N 73.931370°W | 44 | 1931 | Switching only |
| Penn Station | 40.7518°N 73.9979°W | 43A, 43B | 1931 | Switching only; two sections: 31st St., and 7th Ave. |
| Hackensack (Union City) | 40°46′18″N 74°2′38″W | 42 | 1931/32 | |
| Kearney | 40°44′41″N 74°07′06″W | 41 | 1931/32 | Temporarily knocked out October 29, 2012, by storm surge from Hurricane Sandy; elevation above surge crest planned |
| Waverly | 40°41′24″N 74°11′54″W | 40 | 1932-33 | |
| Rahway | 40°36′01″N 74°16′58″W | 39 | 1932-33 | |
| Metuchen | 40°32′21″N 74°21′49″W | 38 | 1932-33 | |
| Millstone | 40°28′45″N 74°27′56″W | 37 | 1932-33 | |
| Monmouth | 40°22′36″N 74°32′54″W | 36 | 1933 | |
| Princeton | 40.317459°N 74.62145°W | 35 | 1933 | |
| Hamilton | 40.2467292°N 74.7179233°W | 34A | 2014 | New substation was commissioned into service in early 2015. |
| Morrisville | 40°12′04″N 74°46′38″W | 34 | 1930 | |
| Edgely | 40°07′07″N 74°50′23″W | 33 | 1930 | |
| Cornwells (Cornwells Heights, PA) | 40°04′19″N 74°57′02″W | 32 | 1930 | |
| Richmond Step-Up | 39.986241°N 75.073939°W | 31 | 1933 | 138kV step-up only, fed from adjacent PECO Richmond Power Station and rotary converter. Abandoned. |
| Frankford | 40°00′07″N 75°5′52″W | 30 | 1930 | Also supplied 44 kV to Allen Lane c. 1930 to c. 19??. |
| Zoo (138 kV) | 39°58′14″N 75°11′57″W | 9 | 1930 | Contains 138 kV circuit breakers. |
| Zoo (44 kV) | 39°58′13″N 75°12′00″W | 8 | 1930 | Removed c. 1960 |
| West Philadelphia Switching | 39°57′27″N 75°11′06″W | 1A | 1930 | Supplied from Arsenal & Zoo |
New Jersey Branches
| Journal Square | 40.733284°N 74.064806°W | 50 | 1932-33 | Catenary disused c. 1980. Remained for a while to supply signal power for PATH and freight on Jersey City Branch. Abandoned. |
| South Amboy | 40°29′25″N 74°17′15″W | 48 | 1932-33 | |
| Helmetta (Outcalt) | 40.3848°N 74.4044°W | 47 | 1938 | Disused c. 1980, abandoned. |
| Greenville Switching | 40°41′12″N 74°05′46″W | 49 | 1935 | Supplied from Waverly. Removed c. 1980 |
Philadelphia – Washington Main Line
| Arsenal | 39°56′44″N 75°11′32″W | 2A | 1928 | 138 kV step-down |
| Brill | 39°55′45″N 75°13′26″W | 10A | 1981 | Added for SEPTA Airport Line |
| Glenolden | 39.899444°N 75.281603°W | 10 | 1928 | |
| Lamokin (Chester, PA) | 39.8429°N 75.3759°W | 11 | 1928 | Adjacent to Rotary Converter |
| Bellevue | 39°46′03″N 75°29′02″W | 12 | 1928 | |
| West Yard (Wilmington, DE) | 39°43′43″N 75°34′13″W | 13 | 1928 | |
| Davis (Newark, DE) | 39°40′21″N 75°44′36″W | 14 | 1935 | |
| Bacon Hill (North East, MD) | 39.6035°N 75.8937°W | 15 | 1935 | |
| Perryville, MD | 39°33′23″N 76°04′36″W | 16 | 1935 | Phase Break Indicator. 138 kV circuit breakers segment transmission lines North from West. |
| Perryman, MD | 39.462501°N 76.203256°W | 17 | 1935 | |
| Gunpow (Chase, MD) | 39.377844°N 76.355243°W | 18 | 1935 | |
| North Point | 39°18′10″N 76°31′02″W | 19 | 1935 | |
| Baltimore | 39.30916°N 76.618955°W | 20 | 1935 | |
| Loudon Park | 39.273084°N 76.67689°W | 21 | 1935 | |
| Severn | 39°08′20″N 76°41′49″W | 22 | 1935 | |
| Bowie | 39°00′21″N 76°46′52″W | 23 | 1935 | |
| Landover | 38°55′44″N 76°53′51″W | 24 | 1935 | |
| Ivy City | 38°55′6″N 76°58′57″W | 2nd 25 | 2010 | |
| Union Switching | 38.9021°N 77.0038°W | 25A | 1935 | 12 kV switching station supplied from Capitol 1935, then Landover c. 1990, then Ivy City 2010. |
| Capitol | 38°52′50″N 77°0′30″W | Formerly 25 | 1935 | Demolished; concrete footings still visible |
| Potomac Switching | 38°50′24″N 77°03′03″W | 26 | 1935 | Supplied from Capitol. Disused c. 1980 and demolished c. 2000, New Utility Sub built. |
Trenton Cutoff Freight Route
| Langhorne | 40°10′30″N 74°58′08″W | 61 | 1938 | Demolished; concrete footings still visible. |
| Horsham | 40°08′55″N 75°08′53″W | 62 | 1938 | Demolished; concrete footings still visible. |
| Earnest | 40°06′24″N 75°19′34″W | 63 | 1930 | Supplied PRR Schuylkill Branch and Trenton Cutoff. Removed. |
Philadelphia – Harrisburg Main Line
| Frazer, PA | 40°01′52″N 75°34′27″W | 64 | 1938 | |
| Thorndale, PA | 39°59′48″N 75°44′3″W | 65 | 1938 | Phase Break Indicators Holds one of the three sets of 138 kV circuit breakers in the system. |
| Parkesburg, PA | 39°57′37″N 75°54′58″W | 66 | 1938 | |
| Kinzer | 39°59′55″N 76°4′8″W | 67 | 1938 | |
| Witmer (Smoketown, PA ) | 40°2′35″N 76°12′51″W | 68 | 1938 | |
| Dillersville Switching | 40°3′25″N 76°19′16″W | -- | 1938 | Supplied Columbia Branch from Mainline catenary (12 kV). Disused c. 1980? |
| Landisville, PA | 40°5′23″N 76°23′0″W | 69 | 1938 | |
| Rheems, PA | 40.130704°N 76.566996°W | 70 | 1938 | |
| Royalton, PA | 40°11′02″N 76°43′33″W | 71 | 1938 | |
| Harrisburg, PA | 40°15′17″N 76°52′25″W | 72 | 1938 | |
Low-grade Freight Routes (now only used for transmission lines)
| Bart | 39°55′03″N 76°04′40″W | 51 | 1938 | Removed |
| Providence | 39°55′42″N 76°13′51″W | 52 | 1938 | Removed |
| Conowingo | 39°40′7″N 76°10′15″W | 53 | 1938 | Demolished; concrete footings still visible. Separate from Conowingo generating station, never connected. |
| Fishing Creek | 39°47′23″N 76°15′46″W | 54 | 1938 | Removed. Separate from Holtwood generating station, never connected. |
| Safe Harbor (PRR) Conestoga Sub (SHWP) | 39°55′36″N 76°23′6″W | 55 | 1934 | Step-up station for Safe Harbor supply. Catenary facilities added 1938 then disused c. 1980. |
| Columbia | 40°01′58″N 76°30′31″W | 56 | 1938 | Removed – site partially paved over. |
| Rowenna (Marietta, PA) | 40°03′43″N 76°36′43″W | 57 | 1938 | Abandoned; concrete footings visible. Single transmission line between Safe Harbor Sub 55 and Royalton Sub 71 runs past site, but no longer terminates. |
| Goldsboro | 40.1217°N 76.7317°W | 58 | 1938 | Removed |
| Enola, PA | 40°16′40″N 76°55′13″W | 59, 73 | 1938 | Demolished; concrete footings still visible. |

== Transmission lines ==
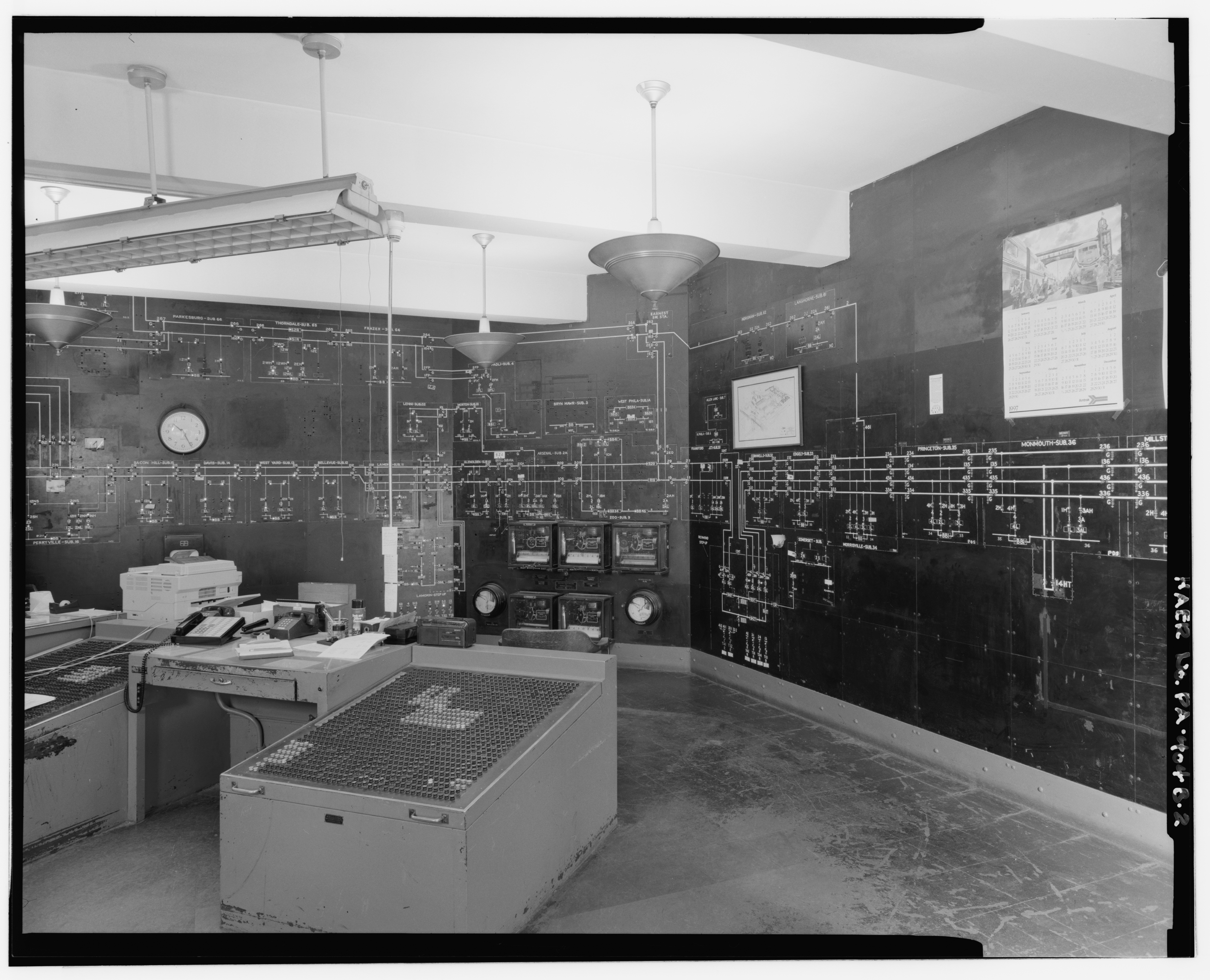
The Load Dispatcher's Mimic Board at 30th Street Station in Philadelphia, Pennsylvania, circa 1996. The entire 138 kV transmission system is represented on this panel.

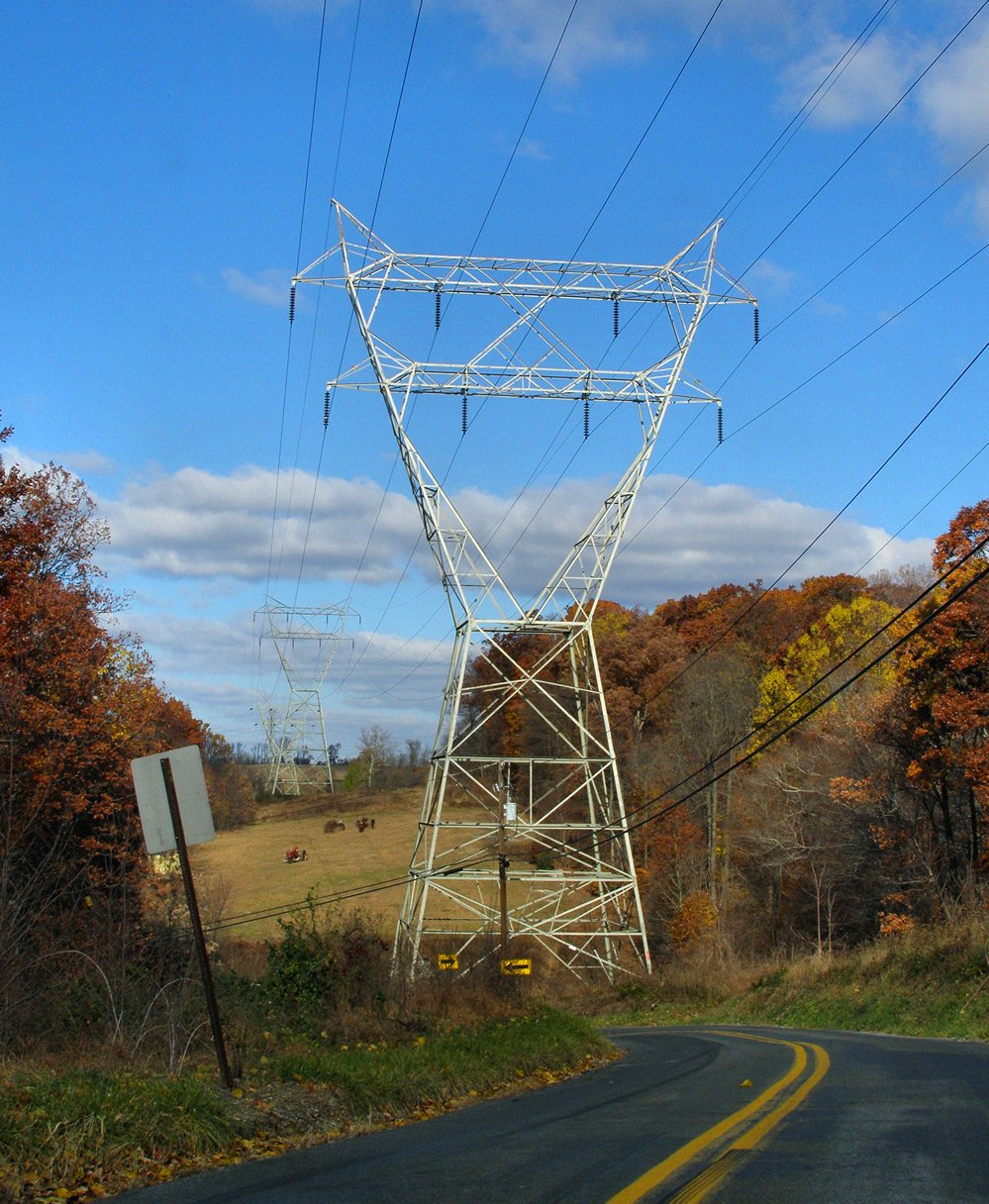
The four utility-owned 138 kV circuits from Safe Harbor (Pennsylvania) to Perryville (Maryland).

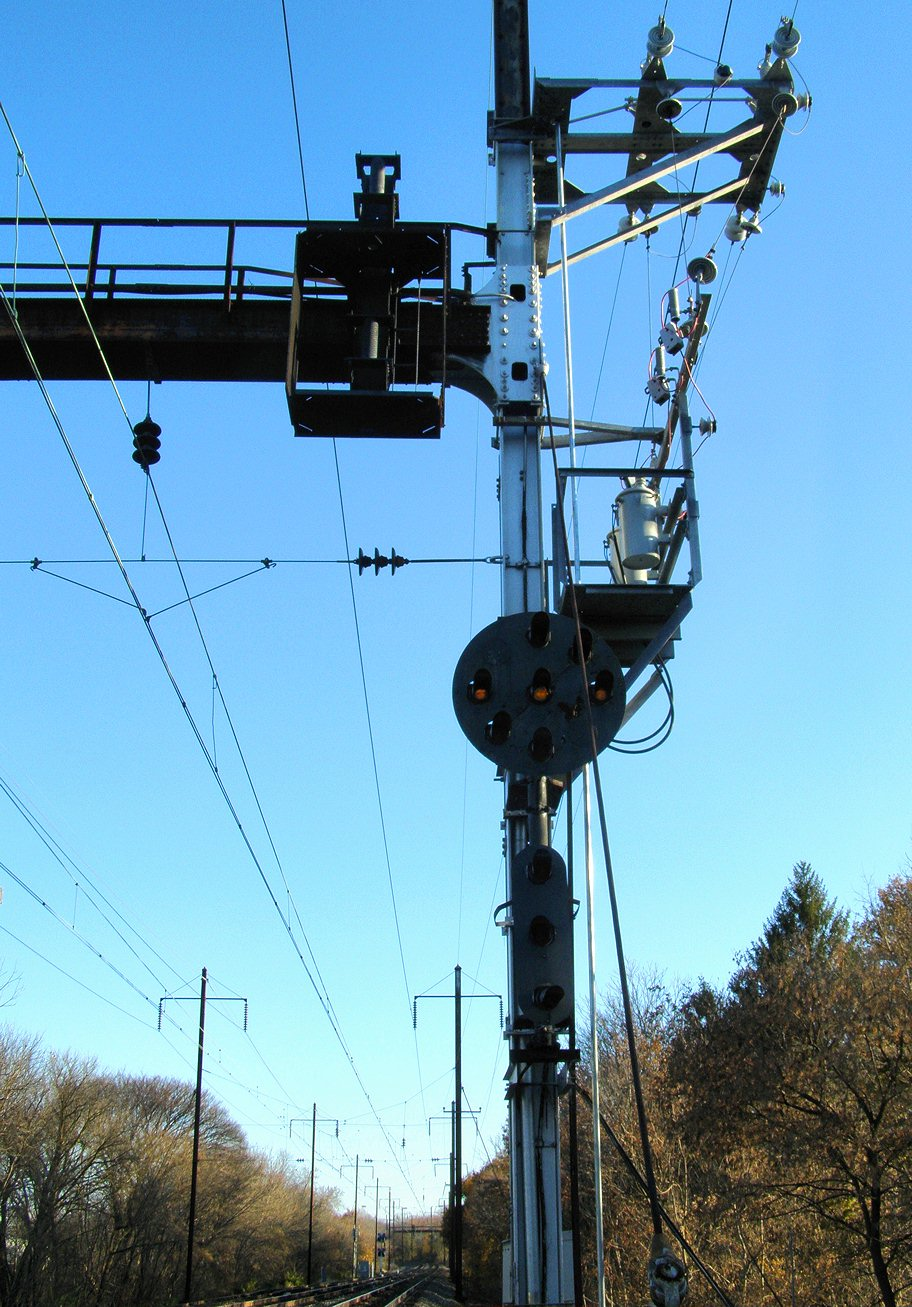
Catenary support with 6.9 kV, 100 Hz transformer for signal power

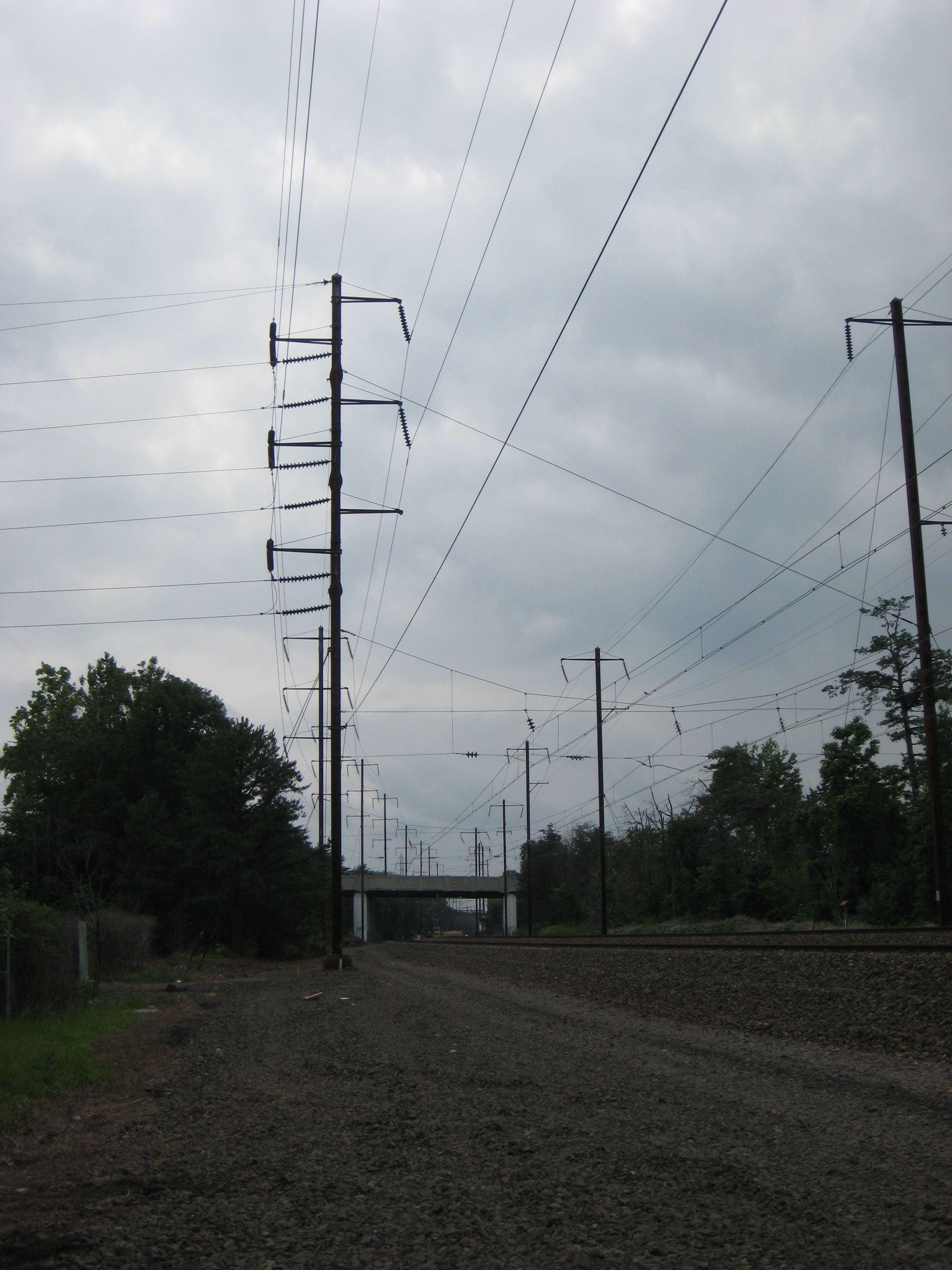
Catenary supports near Odenton, Maryland. Three-conductor 60 Hz utility lines enter from the left and are carried in either direction along the line. The remainder of the high voltage lines are 25 Hz.

All transmission lines within the 25 Hz system are two-wire, single-phase, 138 kV. The center tap of each 138 kV/12 kV transformer is connected to ground; thus the two transmission lines are tied to ±69 kV with respect to ground and 138 kV relative to each other.

Generally, two separate two-wire circuits travel along the rail line between substations. One circuit is mounted at the top of the catenary poles on one side of the track; the second circuit runs along the other side.

The arrangement of catenary supports and transmission wires gives the overhead structure along former Pennsylvania Railroad lines its characteristic 80-foot (24 m)-tall H-shaped structure. They are much taller than the overhead electrification structures on other electrified American railroads due to the 138 kV transmission lines. Catenary towers and transmission lines along former New York, New Haven and Hartford Railroad lines and Amtrak's New England division are much shorter and are recognizable due to different design and construction.

While a majority of the transmission infrastructure is located directly above the rail lines on the same structure that supports the catenary system, some lines are either located above lines that have been de-electrified or abandoned or, in a few cases, on completely independent rights of way.

The following is a list of all major segments of the 25 Hz 138 kV transmission infrastructure listing substations (SS or Sub) or high-tension switching stations (HT Sw'g) as termini. For clarity, the positions of substations are not repeated in this table. A listing of the high-tension switching stations follows.

| Terminus | Terminus | # 138 kV circuits | Right of way | Notes |
|---|---|---|---|---|
| Union City Sub 42 | Cornwell Heights Sub 32 | 4 | Main Line Philadelphia to New York | |
| Kearney Sub 41 | Journal Square Sub 50 | 2 | Jersey City Branch | Out of service, line used by PATH. |
| Rahway Sub 39 | South Amboy 48 | 2 | Perth Amboy & Woodbridge Branch | Used for NJTRO NJCL power |
| Monmouth Jct 36 | South Amboy 48 | 1 | Jamesburg Branch | Via Helmetta Sub 47; Out of service, lines removed. |
| Morrisville Sub 34 | Earnest HT Sw'g | 1 | Trenton Cutoff | Out of service and almost completely removed. Some portions east of the Earnest Junction HT Switching Station and west of the Morrisville Substation (within the confines of the Morrisville yard) remain. |
| Cornwells Heights Sub 32 | Richmond Sub 31 | 2 | Industrial RoW | Splits from Main Line south of Holmesburg and follows alignment along Delaware River. |
| Cornwells Heights Sub 32 | Richmond Sub 31 | 2 | Along Main Line to Frankford Junction, then Delair Branch | |
| Frankford Sub 30 | Richmond Sub 31 | 2 | Delair Branch | 12kV catenary removed. |
| Cornwell Heights Sub 32 | Frankford Sub 30 | 1 | Along Main Line RoW Phil to NY | |
| Frankford Sub 30 | Ivy City Sub 25 | 2 | Main Line from north of Phil to Washington | |
| Zoo Sub 9 | Earnest HT Sw'g | 2 | Schuylkill Branch | Tracks removed past Cynwyd Station. |
| Arsenal Sub 2A | Lenni Sub 02 | 1 | West Chester Branch | Power for SEPTA Media/Wawa Line. |
| Lamokin Sub 11 | Lenni Sub 02 | 1 (2) | Private RoW | Feeds west end of SEPTA Media/Wawa Line. Utility-style transmission towers roughly paralleling former Chester Creek Branch. Built 1928 with two circuits, as indicated on PRR ET-1 of 1935; one circuit later removed, probably in 1960s. |
| Lenni Sub 02 | West Chester Sub 04 | 2 | Private RoW | Westward continuation of Lamokin-Lenni 138 kV circuits via Cheyney Sub 03. Utility-style transmission towers on RoW directly parallel to West Chester Branch. De-energized and removed between 1965 and 1968. |
| Earnest HT Sw'g | Frazer Sub 64 | 2 | Runs along Trenton Cutoff | Powers Main Line via Frazer Sub |
| Paoli Sub 4 | Landisville Sub 69 | 2 | Main Line Philadelphia to Harrisburg | Frazer SS to Paoli SS dead end line. |
| Parkesburg Sub 66 | Safe Harbor Sub 55 | 2 | Atglen and Susquehanna | Rails removed. Catenary poles removed and transmission lines replaced in 2010/2011. See section below. |
| Landisville Sub 69 | Royalton Sub 71 | 1 | Main Line Philadelphia to Harrisburg | |
| Safe Harbor Sub 55 | Rowenna Sub 57 | 2 | Enola Branch | After Rowenna Sub decommissioned, one circuit logically split to run direct to Royalton Sub. |
| Rowenna Sub 57 | Royalton Sub 71 | 1 | Royalton Branch | Line now continuous from Safe Harbor to Royalton. |
| Rowenna Sub 57 | Lemo HT Sw'g | 1 | Enola Branch | Out of service, then removed 2011. |
| Lemo HT Sw'g | Enola Sub 59 | 2 | Enola Branch | Served at Enola Yard, then removed 2011. |
| Royalton Sub 71 | Harrisburg Sub 72 | 2 | Main Line Philadelphia to Harrisburg | |
| Lemo HT Sw'g | Harrisburg Sub 72 | 2 | Runs across Susquehanna River on Cumberland Valley RR Bridge | Out of service |
| Safe Harbor Sub 55 | Perryville Sub 16 | 4 | Private RoW | Utility-style transmission towers. P5 and P6 lines were tapped south to serve Fishing Creek Sub 54 and Conowingo Sub 53. These taps were removed concurrently with their associated substations. |
| Landover Sub 24 | Ivy City Sub 25 | 2 | Main Line Philadelphia to Washington | Portion from Landover (24) to Ivy City (25) constructed in 2010. |
| Landover Sub 24 | Capitol (Former Sub 25) | 2 | Landover Line | Former route to Capitol Sub 25. Out of service and partially removed. |

High-tension switching stations – located outside substations, i.e. in the field
| Name | Location | Designation | Comments |
|---|---|---|---|
| Metuchen HT Sw'g | 40.548998°N 74.346318°W | 138M through 438M | Disconnects each of main line circuits (4) from two spurs that runs via private ROW to Metuchen Frequency Changer. |
| Lemo HT Sw'g | 40.248454°N 76.888483°W | | West of Susquehanna River near Harrisburg; disconnects circuits running between Enola, Harrisburg, and Rowenna substations |
| Earnest HT Sw'g | 40°6′15″N 75°19′15″W | 163, 263 (Trenton Cutoff E); 164, 264 (Trenton Cutoff W); 1ED, 2ED (to Zoo) | Located at junction between Trenton Cutoff and Schuylkill Branch. Manually operated disconnect switches, now redundant with the abandonment of Trenton Cutoff transmission line and removal of Earnest Sub 63. |
| Frankford HT Sw'g | 40.0013°N 75.0943°W | 22 | Disconnects the feeder (42H) from Richmond from transmission line running between Frankford (22HT) and Cornwells (230E) in event of damage to catenary supports on Delair Branch. Allow limited feeding between Cornwells and Frankford to bypass Richmond. Damaged following the 2015 Philadelphia train derailment. |

== Recent developments ==
Ivy City Substation 25 under construction in Washington, D.C., in 2010

Amtrak's capital improvement program which began in 2003 has continued to the present day and has since 2009 received added support from economic stimulus funding sources (American Recovery and Reinvestment Act of 2009 or ARRA).

Major improvements in 2010 included:

- Completion of the Ivy City substation and 138 kV transmission line.
- Replace five traction power transformers.
- Renew 40 miles (64 km) of catenary in Maryland.
- Renew 18 miles (29 km) of catenary in Pennsylvania.
- Continue catenary renewal along Hell Gate Line in New York.
- Replace the 138 kV transmission line between Safe Harbor (Conestoga Substation) and Atglen, PA (just west of Parkesburg, PA).

Major improvements planned for the future include:

- Upgrade the Metuchen frequency converter.
- Construction of a new substation, called Hamilton (Sub 34A), between Morrisville and Princeton.
- Upgrade of the catenary and power system for high-speed operation in New Jersey.

=== Ivy City substation project ===
The Ivy City substation project marked the first extension of 138 kV transmission line since the Safe Harbor Dam was constructed in 1938. In the original PRR electrification scheme, the 138 kV transmission lines went south from Landover to the Capital South substation rather than following the line through Ivy City to the northern approach to Union Station. The two tracks between Landover and Union Station had no high voltage transmission line above them; Union Station catenary was fed at 12 kV from the Landover and Capitol substations (the latter via the First Street Tunnels). When the Capitol South substation was abandoned, coincident with the de-electrification of the track between Landover and Potomac Yard, Union Station and its approaches became a single-end fed section of track. This, combined with rising traffic levels, resulted in low voltage conditions on the approaches to Union Station and decreased system reliability.

The Ivy City project resulted in the installation of two 4.5 MVA transformers in a 138/12 kV substation on the northeast edge of the Ivy City yard complex and 5.2 miles (8.4 km) of 138 kV transmission line to augment the overstretched facilities at Landover. Since the original catenary supports along this section of track were only high enough for the 12 kV catenary wire, the 138 kV lines were installed on new steel monopod poles installed along the right-of-way. Except for the fact that the new poles only carry four conductors rather than the typical six for a utility line, the new line appears as a typical medium voltage power line rather than the typical PRR-style H-shaped structure.

=== Conestoga to Atglen transmission line ===
In 2011, Amtrak replaced the transmission lines that tie the Conestoga Substation to Parkesburg via Atglen. These lines were originally installed over the Atglen and Susquehanna Branch. The line was subsequently abandoned by Conrail and the tracks removed, but Amtrak has retained an easement to operate its 138 kV transmission lines over the roadbed. Towers and conductors and wire over 24 miles (39 km) of the route were replaced; work was completed in September 2011. The scope of work included:

- Original portal and cantilever catenary support (~450 structures) removal.
- Installation of 257 new monopole structures.
- 96 miles (154 km) of ACSR transmission conductor installation (two circuits, two wires each).
- 24 miles (39 km) of fiberoptic ground line.

Funding for this project was included under the ARRA program. The specified number of poles spaced approximately 500 feet (150 m) per tower is approximately twice as far apart as the span length between the 1930s structures, which averaged 270 feet (82 m).

=== Zoo to Paoli transmission line ===
In late 2010, Amtrak solicited design services for new transmission lines between Paoli and Zoo substations. Primary objectives of this expansion include improving the reliability of transmission between Safe Harbor and Philadelphia and reducing maintenance costs. This project complements the Safe Harbor to Atglen transmission line replacement, which has already been completed.

The Zoo to Paoli transmission line would replace the current supply scheme, which uses 138 kV lines that run circuitously along the SEPTA Cynwyd Line, the Schuylkill Branch rail-trails and the Trenton Cut-off between the Zoo and Frazer substations. The new routing will reduce maintenance costs, as Amtrak must maintain transmission poles and control vegetation along the right-of-way, which it neither owns nor uses for revenue service. The conceptual line will run from the existing Paoli substation to the junction of the Harrisburg to Philadelphia main line and SEPTA's Cynwyd Line at 52nd Street in West Philadelphia. 39.9785°N 75.2280°W.

The new lines would connect to the existing 1ED and 2ED circuits, which would be abandoned between the junction and their current terminus at the Earnest Junction HT Switch. The plan also includes the construction of a 138/12 kV substation at Bryn Mawr to replace the existing switching station. The existing 1915 catenary structures are planned for replacement, and new transmission supports will be compatible with catenary replacement. However, none of this was done due to local opposition.

=== Hamilton substation project ===
A new substation (Number 34A) called Hamilton was constructed in Mercer County, NJ. Work on the site began in early 2013, and the substation sap put into service in early 2015.

=== Morton and Lenni ===
The Morton #01 and Lenni #02 substations are owned by SEPTA and supply the Media/Wawa Line; therefore, they are not covered by Amtrak capital funding programs. SEPTA's own capital improvement plan, formulated in late 2013 after passage of funding legislation in Pennsylvania, allowed for the renewal of all components at Morton and Lenni.

==== Lenni ====
In October 2014 SEPTA requested interested contractors to submit bids for the rehabilitation of Lenni substation. In December 2014 SEPTA awarded a $6.82 million contract to Vanalt Electrical for the work. The work was completed by the end of fall 2016.

==== Morton ====
In February 2014 SEPTA awarded a $6.62 million contract to Philips Brothers Electrical Contractors Inc. for the rehabilitation of Morton substation. The work was completed by the end of fall 2016.

== Recent problems ==
Despite the recent capital improvements throughout the system, several high-profile power failures have occurred along the NEC in recent years.

=== May 26, 2006, Blackout ===
On May 25, 2006, during restoration from maintenance on one of the Richmond inverter modules, a command to restore the module to full output capability was not executed. The system tolerated this reduced capacity for about 36 hours, during which time the problem went unnoticed. During rush hour the next morning (May 26), the overall capacity became overloaded:

- At 7:55 am, the two Jericho Park converter breakers tripped.
- Shortly after, the Sunnyside converter tripped.
- At 8:02 am, three of the Richmond converter modules breakers tripped. A fourth tripped shortly afterward. After the fourth Richmond breaker tripped, the system began to destabilize. Human operators recognized the impending system damage and manually tripped the remaining power supplies, shutting down the entire 25 Hz network.

By 8:03 am, the entire 25 Hz system, stretching from Washington, D.C. to Queens, New York, was shut down. About 52,000 people were stranded on trains or otherwise affected. Two New Jersey Transit trains stranded under the Hudson River were retrieved by diesel locomotives. The restoration was hampered by policies that allowed the converter stations to operate unattended during rush hour periods. The 25 Hz system was restored by a 'black start' using the Safe Harbor water turbines, and most services along the system returned to normal by mid-afternoon. Amtrak subsequently improved its system of maintaining 'rescue' diesel locomotives near the Hudson River tunnels.

=== December 23, 2009, Brownout ===
Low system voltage around New York City caused a halt of trains in and around the New York area at 8:45 am on Wednesday, December 23, 2009. Power was never fully lost, and full voltage was restored by 11:30 am. Amtrak stated that an electrical problem in North Bergen, New Jersey (near the western portal and the Union City substation) caused the problem but did not further elaborate on the nature of the malfunction.

=== August 24, 2010, Brownout ===
Low system voltages beginning at 7:45 am on Tuesday, August 24, 2010, caused Amtrak to order an essentially system-wide stoppage of trains within the 25 Hz traction network. Slow-speed service was gradually restored, and the power problem was corrected by 9:00 am, although delays persisted the remainder of the morning.

=== October–November 2012: Hurricane Sandy ===
On October 29, 2012, Hurricane Sandy struck the northeast coast of the U.S. Augmented by a nor'easter, the storm surge from Sandy raced through the Hackensack Meadows, severely damaging (among other railroad infrastructure) Kearney Substation #41 and knocking it offline. This loss of electrical capacity forced Amtrak and New Jersey Transit to operate fewer trains, using modified weekend schedules. With assistance from the U.S. Army Corps of Engineers, the substation was isolated from floodwaters and then dewatered. After testing the substation's components, the degree of damage was determined to be less than initially feared, and after further repairs, Kearney Substation came back on-line on Friday, November 16, allowing the immediate return of all Amtrak and gradual return of all NJ Transit electric trains into Penn Station through the dewatered North River Tunnels.

Amtrak has since requested federal funding to upgrade the Kearny substation so it is high enough not to be affected by flood water.

== See also ==
- 25 kV AC railway electrification
- Amtrak's 60 Hz traction power system operates along the northern portions of the Northeast Corridor from New Haven to Boston
- Electrification of the New York, New Haven, and Hartford Railroad, electrification between New York and New Haven.
- SEPTA's 25 Hz traction power system, also used by commuter trains in the Philadelphia area.
- List of railway electrification systems
- Railroad electrification in the United States
