= Amtrak's 60 Hz traction power system =

Northeast Corridor railroad power system

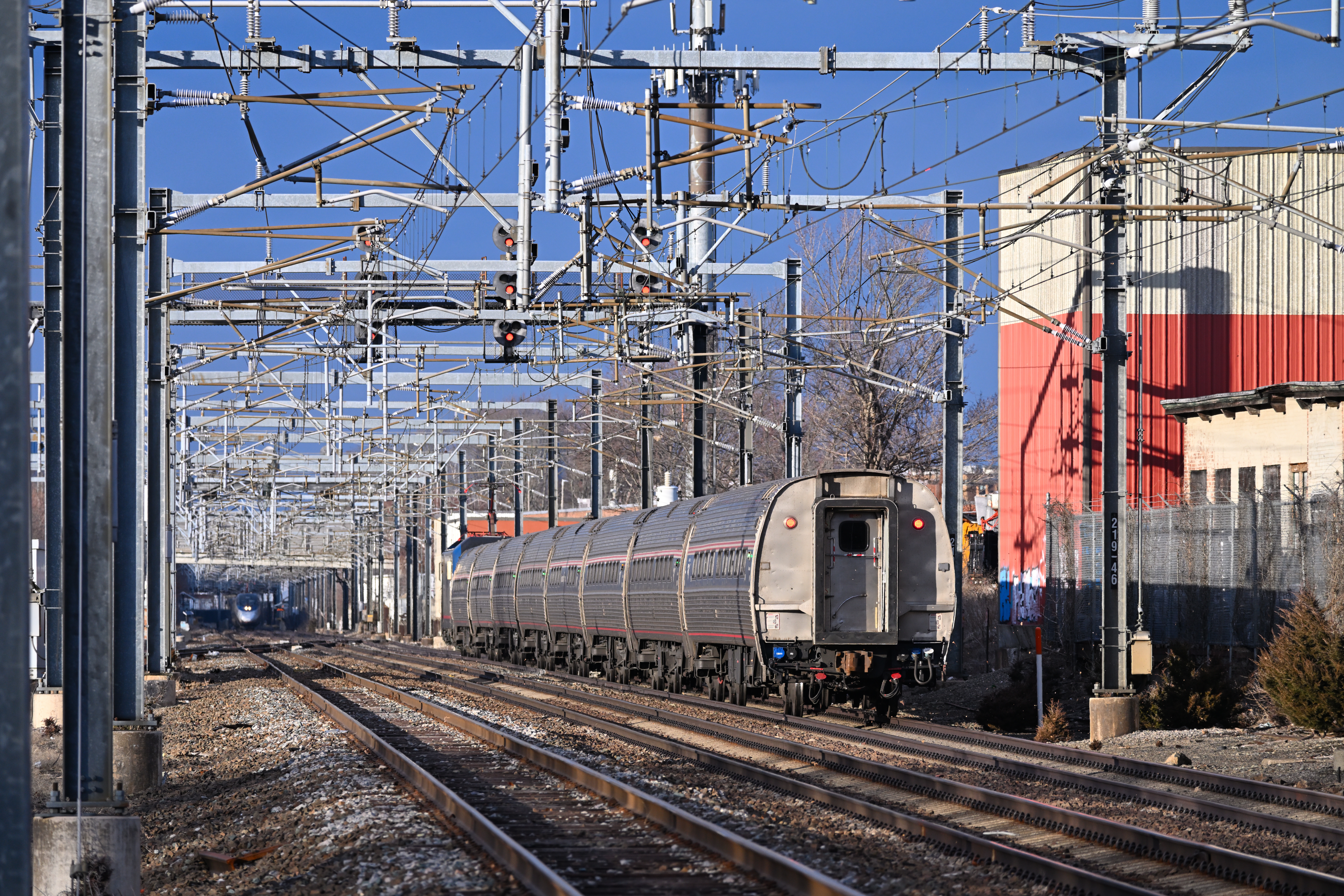
A Northeast Regional train passing Readville station with an approaching Acela in the distance

Amtrak’s 60 Hz traction power system operates along the Northeast Corridor between New Haven, Connecticut, (Note: Specifically, Amtrak's 25 kV system begins at the Mill River Interlocking about two miles north of New Haven Union Station 41.311281°N 72.911775°W) and Boston, Massachusetts. This system was built by Amtrak in the late 1990s and supplies locomotives with power from an overhead catenary system at 25 kV alternating current at 60 Hz, the standard frequency in North America. The system is also known as the Northend Electrification, in contrast to Amtrak's 25 Hz traction power system that runs between New York City and Washington, D.C., which is known as the Southend Electrification system.

== History ==
In 1992, Congress passed the Amtrak Authorization and Development Act, requiring Amtrak to establish high-speed rail passenger service between New York City and Boston. The goal was to reduce travel time in this corridor from 4.5 hours to less than 3 hours. Revenue from this service was expected to play a critical role in helping Amtrak achieve operating self-sufficiency by 2003. Before Amtrak could begin high-speed rail service, 155 miles (249 km) of rail line between New Haven and Boston had to be electrified. Previously, electrified Metroliner service was available between Washington, D.C., and New Haven, Connecticut. At New Haven, Amtrak had to switch to a diesel locomotive to complete the trip to Boston. In addition to the higher operating speeds possible with electrified service, Amtrak also saves the time it spent on switching locomotives. By the time the project was complete, Amtrak was expected to have spent over $600 million to electrify the line between New Haven and Boston. Including extensive track and infrastructure improvements besides the electrification, the project cost $1.6 billion.

In December 1995, Amtrak awarded a $321 million contract to Balfour Beatty Construction, Inc./Mass. Electric Construction (BBC/MEC) to verify and complete the Morrison–Knudsen design and build the electrification system. The system was to be completed by June 1999; electrification system ground-breaking ceremony took place the following July.

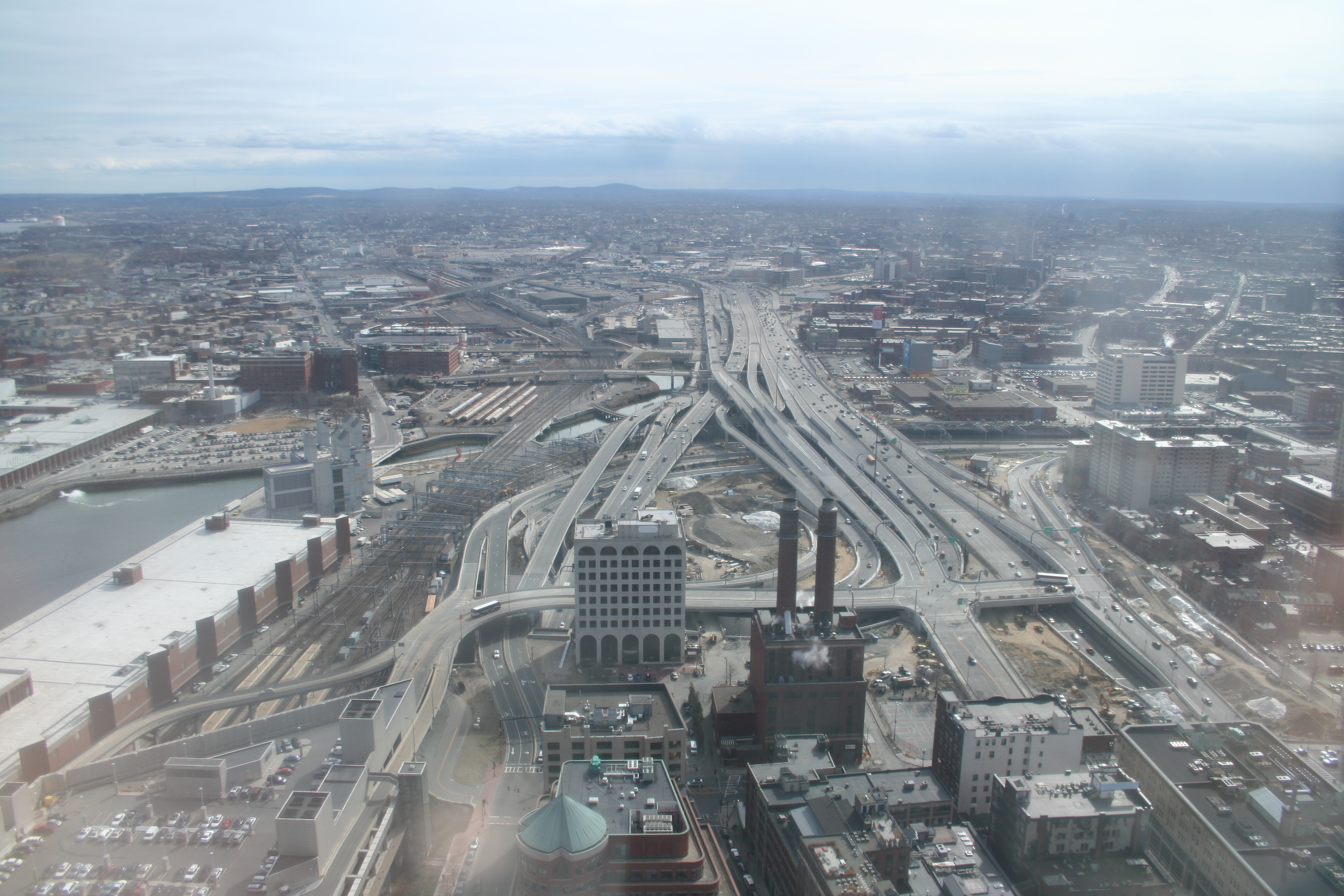
Approach to South Station, Boston, showing electrified track (left) and the massive complex of roads that were under construction at the same time as the electrification.

Amtrak's contractor faced a difficult working environment in the Boston Terminal Area because of the extensive work being undertaken for the Central Artery project, which involved over 500 employees in the South Boston Terminal area alone and entailed on-site storage of a large amount of heavy construction equipment and supplies. The Central Artery project was ongoing before the electrification project started. Another factor complicating electrification work in the Boston Terminal Area is the large volume of rail traffic. Over 250 Massachusetts Bay Transportation Authority (MBTA) commuter trains and 20 Amtrak trains operate through the area daily. As a result, taking track out of service to work on the electrification was sometimes difficult.

Electrification work on the five movable bridges between Old Saybrook and Mystic in Connecticut was also a challenge, as each one required a unique electrification design and construction solution. The bridges span busy waterways shared by pleasure craft, commercial carriers, and military traffic. Unlike most movable highway bridges, these bridges are usually open, and are closed only to accommodate approaching train traffic.

After several delays, service with electric locomotives between New Haven and Boston began on January 31, 2000. Amtrak began operating its higher-speed Acela Express service on December 11, 2000.

== Types of stations ==
=== System architecture ===
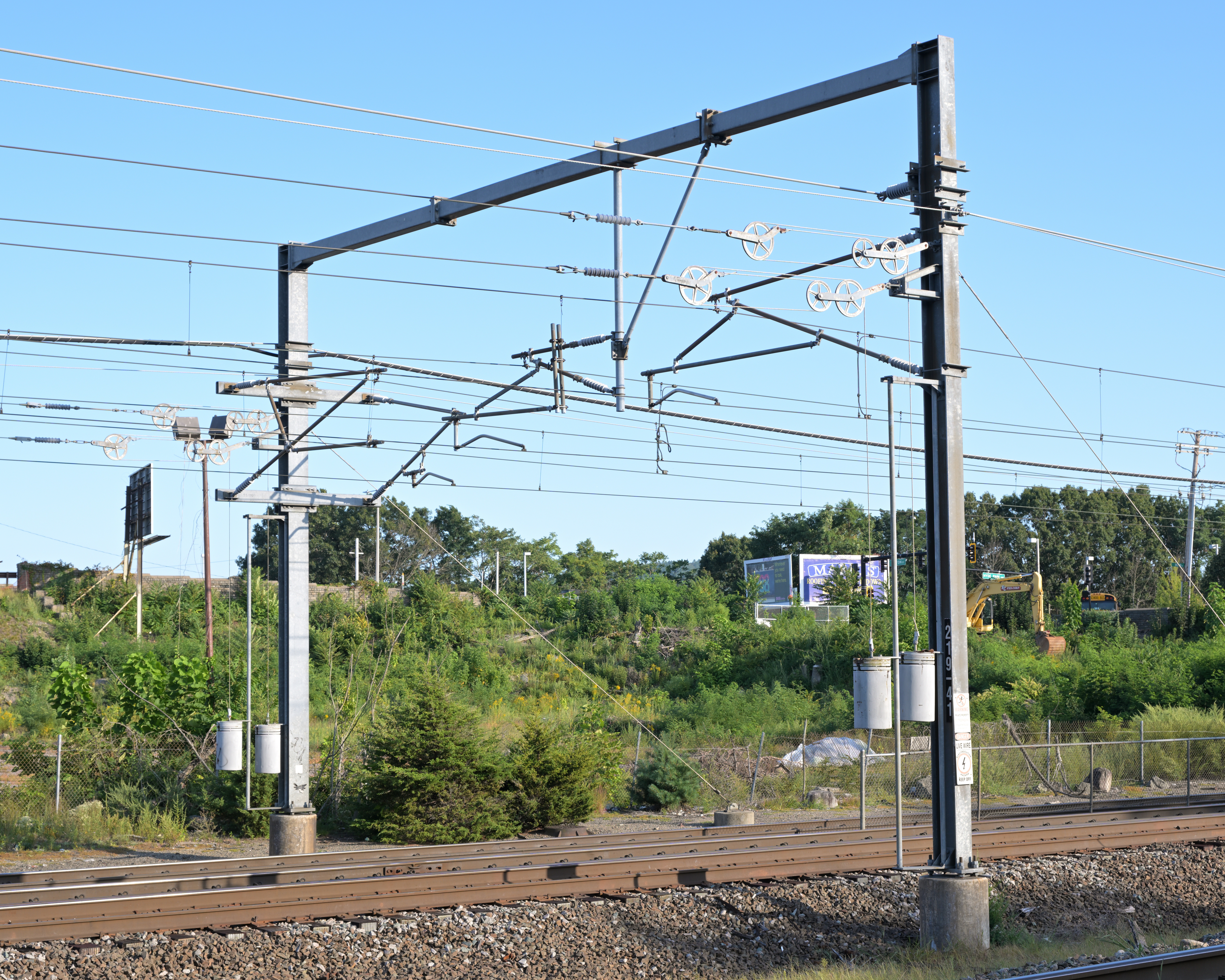
A catenary pole of the system. Catenary wires and contact wires are tensioned by individual tension balancers.

The basic system unit is an elementary electrical section consisting of a segment of one or more parallel tracks, each with a contiguous contact (or catenary or trolley) wire for the locomotive pantograph and an electrically separate feed wire. Elementary electrical sections are separated by section breaks where the contact and feeder wires can be interrupted with motor-operated air switches to isolate a section in the event of a fault or to permit maintenance.

An electrical section is a collection of elementary electrical sections, section breaks, air switches and paralleling stations between a substation and a switching station.

At each substation, utility-supplied single phase power is transformed and injected into the two electrical sections terminating at that substation. There are eight electrical sections in the system, two for each substation. The substations drive the contact and feed wires in a split phase arrangement so that each wire is at 25 kV with respect to the grounded running rails with 50 kV between them.

At periodically spaced paralleling stations within each electrical section the tracks' catenary wires are connected together to one side of an autotransformer and the feeder wires are connected together to the other side of the autotransformer. The autotransformer center tap is connected to the grounded running rails that return the current from the locomotives. The paralleling stations thus reduce voltage drops by feeding a locomotive from both directions along its contact wire and spreading the load across all the contact and feed wires of a multitrack system. The split-phase arrangement also gains the increased efficiency of operating at 50 kV while the highest voltage with respect to ground remains only 25 kV. (The same split-phase method is used in North American homes to supply high power loads such as air conditioners with the efficiency of a 240 V supply while retaining the safety advantages of a 120 V supply.)

=== Substations ===
There are four substations between New Haven and Boston:

- Branford, CT
- New London, CT
- Warwick, RI
- Sharon, MA

Each station contains two 115 kV (single phase) to 50 kV (single phase with center tap) transformers to convert the utility supplied transmission voltage to 50 kV traction voltage. Output circuit breakers, and a capacitor based filter network are installed. The filter banks suppress the high frequency (that is anything above 60 Hz) harmonics on the catenary lines generated by locomotives' solid-state traction motor inverters. The filters also provide reactive power support and correct for power factor. Amtrak's 60 Hz electrification distributes power using ±25 kV from ground via a center tap of the 115/50 kV transformers. This system is also known as 2 × 25 kV.

=== Switching stations ===
Three switching stations are the equivalent of distribution level substations, which transform higher voltage electricity to the 25 kV voltage, and are located along the line which separate the different electrical sections (power zones):

- Westbrook, CT
- Richmond, RI
- Norton, MA

The switching stations contain three autotransformers similar to the paralleling stations (which have one), and also have additional circuit breakers to allow segmentation of catenary and cross-connection between power zones.

Electrical sections encompass both tracks between a substation and the adjacent switching stations. Normally no power flows from one side of a switching station to the other side; it is like two adjacent paralleling stations which serve different electrical sections. In the event that a substation is taken out of service, switching stations have additional circuit breakers which allow feeding an electrical section from the adjacent section.

Since switching stations, like substations, normally separate electrical sections with different supply sources (and thus different phase or voltage), a neutral section (Note: The terms 'phase break', 'neutral section', and 'dead section' are colloquially interchanged. Agarwal refers to these as 'neutral sections'. In the ex-PRR portions of Amtrak's system, they would be known as 'dead sections'.) always occupies the track between the two electrical sections.

In the event of a fault in one elementary electrical section, the switching station can back-feed the far portion of the affected track from the non-affected track, which the supplying substation feeds the near end.

=== Paralleling stations ===
Stonington Paralleling Station

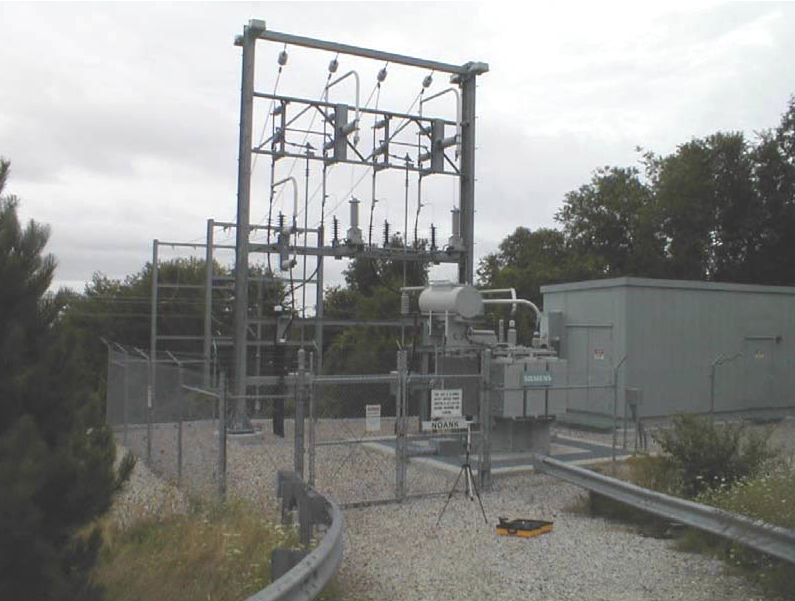
Noank Paralleling Station

Eighteen paralleling stations are located at approximately six mile intervals along the line. Each contains a single autotransformer (with the exception of Roxbury, which has two), automatic circuit breakers, motor-operated air switches, and a control shed. The autotransformers are rated at 10 MVA, 1.2% impedance, two winding, 27.5 kV.

Each paralleling station bus is connected to both north and south track catenary and feeder lines via automatic circuit breakers. The autotransformer is connected to the bus bars by an additional circuit breaker. The track breakers at the paralleling stations trip on sensing no-voltage. Thus when a line fault causes the supplying substation breakers to trip, the paralleling stations also trip. This action separates the two tracks from one another electrically and allows the substation to automatically restore one of the tracks (the non-faulted one). After a variable time delay (to reduce simultaneous inrush current), over-voltage relays will re-shut the track circuit breakers on the non-faulted track.

== List of stations ==
Schematic of substations along the Northend Electrification

Amtrak Northend Electrification Stations
MP	State	Municipality	Type	Coordinates	Comments
228.49	MA	Boston (South Station)	N/A		End of electrification
226.12	MA	Boston (Roxbury)	Paralleling station	42.3331°N 71.0937°W	
219.08	MA	Boston (Readville)	Paralleling station	42.2365°N 71.1343°W	
212.36	MA	Sharon	Substation	42.1442°N 71.1642°W	
204.98	MA	East Foxboro	Paralleling station	42.0456°N 71.2107°W	
198.68	MA	Norton	Switching station	41.969°N 71.2652°W	
193.41	MA	Attleboro	Paralleling station	41.903555°N 71.322914°W	
187.60	RI	Providence	Paralleling station	41.860604°N 71.406251°W	
181.89	RI	Elmwood	Paralleling station	41.798065°N 71.42868°W	
176.94	RI	Warwick	Substation	41.732459°N 71.440597°W	
169.82	RI	East Greenwich	Paralleling station	41.634505°N 71.463999°W	
161.81	RI	Exeter	Paralleling station	41.525942°N 71.518782°W	
157.15	RI	Kingston	Paralleling station	41.475541°N 71.57462°W	
150.15	RI	Richmond	Switching station	41.437637°N 71.689892°W	
145.19	RI	Bradford	Paralleling station	41.394712°N 71.760969°W	
139.97	CT	State Line	Paralleling station	41.3644°N 71.8403°W	
134.70	CT	Stonington	Paralleling station	41.3403°N 71.9254°W	
129.50	CT	Noank	Paralleling station	41.3234°N 71.9984°W	
123.56	CT	New London	Substation	41.3629°N 72.093°W	Transformers are grade separated from roadbed; catenary feeders run underground.
117.54	CT	Millstone	Paralleling station	41.3164°N 72.1644°W	
109.30	CT	Old Lyme	Paralleling station	41.2966°N 72.3044°W	
103.10	CT	Westbrook	Switching station	41.2900°N 72.4112°W	
98.87	CT	Grove Beach	Paralleling station	41.2768°N 72.4875°W	
92.19	CT	Madison	Paralleling station	41.2840°N 72.6112°W	
86.10	CT	Leetes Island	Paralleling station	41.2655°N 72.7250°W	
78.96	CT	Branford	Substation	41.2841°N 72.8537°W	Transformers located N. of I-95.
73.6	CT	Mill River Interlocking	N/A	41.311281°N 72.911775°W	End of 25 kV, 60 Hz system

== See also ==
- 25 kV AC railway electrification
- Amtrak 25 Hz traction power system, operating along the southern portions of the Northeast Corridor from New York to Washington
- Electrification of the New York, New Haven, and Hartford Railroad, from New York to New Haven.
- List of railway electrification systems
- North–South Rail Link
- SEPTA 25 Hz traction power system
