= Royalton, Pennsylvania =

Borough in Pennsylvania, US

- Borough
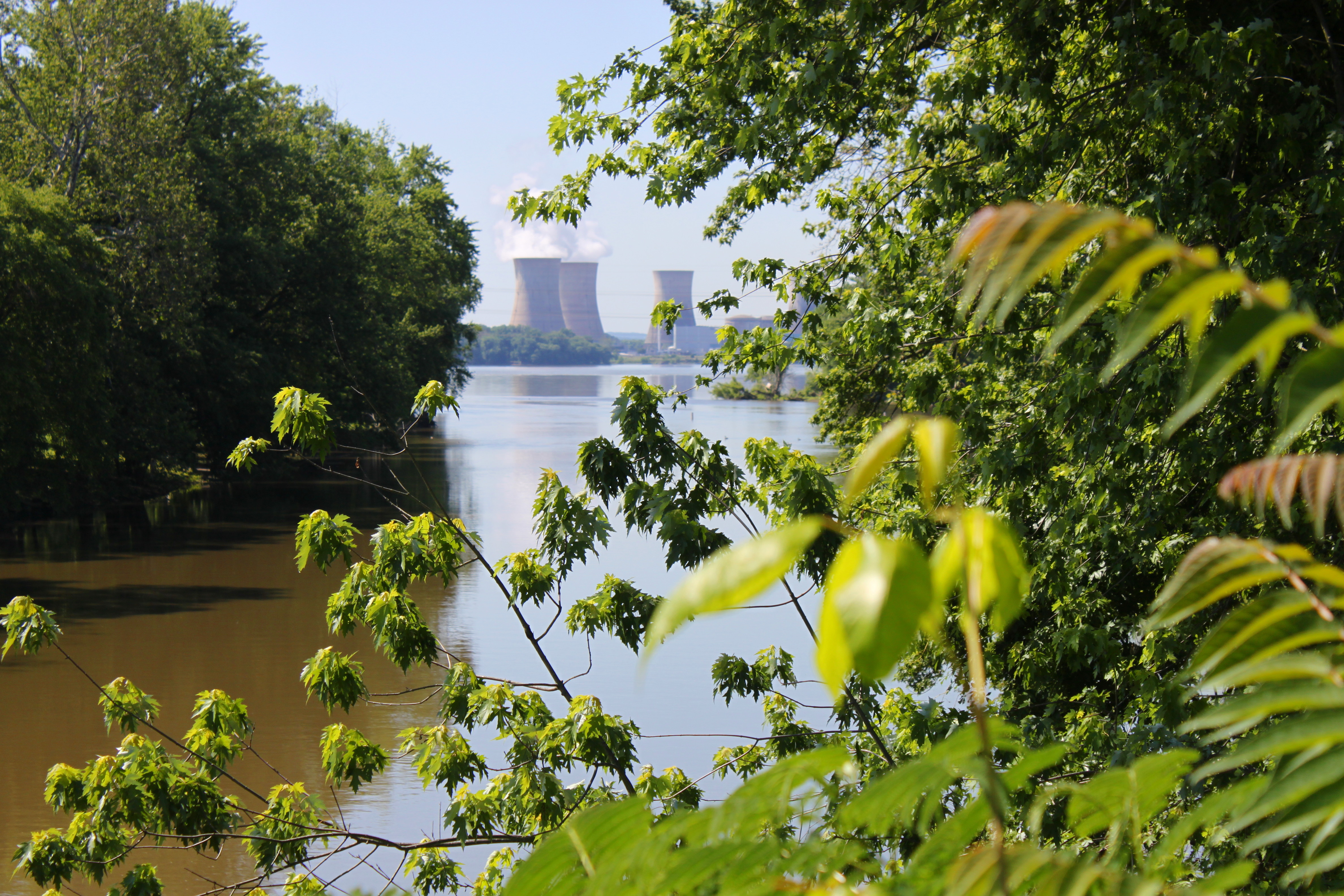

- Location in Dauphin County and the U.S. state of Pennsylvania.

- Location in Pennsylvania and the United States Royalton (the United States)
- Coordinates: 40°11′18″N 76°43′38″W
- Country: United States
- State: Pennsylvania
- County: Dauphin
- Incorporated: 1892

Government
  - Type: Borough Council
  - Mayor: James M. Fry

Area
  - Total: 0.35 sq mi (0.91 km^{2})
  - Land: 0.32 sq mi (0.82 km^{2})
  - Water: 0.031 sq mi (0.08 km^{2})
- Elevation: 305 ft (93 m)

Population (2020)
  - Total: 1,134 ▲
  - Estimate (2021): 1,132
  - Density: 3,209.9/sq mi (1,239.34/km^{2})
- Time zone: UTC-5 (Eastern (EST))
  - Summer (DST): UTC-4 (EDT)
- ZIP code: 17057
- Area code: 717
- FIPS code: 42-66560
- Website: royaltonpa.com

Royalton is a borough in Dauphin County, Pennsylvania, United States. As of the 2020 census the borough population was 1,134.

It is part of the Harrisburg metropolitan area. It shares its ZIP code with neighboring Middletown.

== History ==
Royalton was officially incorporated in September 1891. It was formed by combining the communities of Furnace Hill to the north and Port Royal to the south. Its first postmaster was Mary E. Snavely.

Early industries included a sixty-foot planing mill that was built by John McCreary in 1891 and the Middletown Shale Brick Works, which was built in the borough's southeast section circa 1900 and operated by H. O. Keener, Joseph Landis, Frank Nissley, Dr. J. C. Nissley, and S. C. Peters. Within four years, the latter business had increased its workforce to thirty and was producing roughly twenty-five thousand bricks per year.

== Geography ==
Royalton is located in southern Dauphin County at 40°11′18″N 76°43′38″W (40.188325, -76.727280). It is bordered to the southwest by the Susquehanna River, and to the west and north by Swatara Creek, across which is the borough of Middletown.

Pennsylvania Route 441 (Canal Street) passes through the center of the borough, leading north into Middletown and southeast (downriver) 18 miles (29 km) to Columbia.

Harrisburg, the state capital, is eleven miles to the northwest (upriver).

According to the United States Census Bureau, the borough of Royalton has a total area of 0.34 square miles (0.87 km^{2}), of which 0.30 square miles (0.78 km^{2}) is land and 0.03 square miles (0.08 km^{2}), or 9.48%, is water.

== Demographics ==
Historical population
Census	Pop.	Note	%±
1900	1,106		—
1910	1,033		−6.6%
1920	1,156		11.9%
1930	1,117		−3.4%
1940	1,201		7.5%
1950	1,175		−2.2%
1960	1,128		−4.0%
1970	1,040		−7.8%
1980	981		−5.7%
1990	1,120		14.2%
2000	963		−14.0%
2010	907		−5.8%
2020	1,138		25.5%
2021 (est.)	1,132	▼	−0.5%

As of the census of 2010, there were 1083 people, 395 households, and 270 families residing in the borough. The population density was 2,774.8 inhabitants per square mile (1,071.4/km^{2}).

There were 415 housing units at an average density of 1,195.8 per square mile (461.7/km^{2}).

The racial makeup of the borough was 95.43% White, 0.52% African American, 0.31% Native American, 1.35% Asian, 0.83% from other races, and 1.56% from two or more races. Hispanic or Latino of any race were 2.49% of the population.

There were 395 households, out of which 29.1% had children under the age of eighteen living with them, 50.6% were married couples living together, 13.9% had a female householder with no husband present, and 31.4% were non-families. 26.3% of all households were made up of individuals, and 7.1% had someone living alone who was sixty-five years of age or older. The average household size was 2.44 and the average family size was 2.90.

In the borough the population was spread out, with 22.9% under the age of eighteen, 7.3% from eighteen to twenty-four, 30.7% from twenty-five to forty-four, 27.2% from forty-five to sixty-four, and 11.8% who were sixty-five years of age or older. The median age was thirty-eight years. For every one hundred females, there were 85.9 males. For every one hundred females aged eighteen and over, there were 91.2 males.

The median income for a household in the borough was $41,917, and the median income for a family was $44,821. Males had a median income of $34,688 versus $26,513 for females. The per capita income for the borough was $18,029.

About 4.8% of families and 7.8% of the population were below the poverty line, including 15.6% of those under age 18 and 3.6% of those age 65 or over.
