= Sherman Creek Generating Station =

Coordinates: 40.8594°N 73.9198°W

The Sherman Creek Generating Station was a coal-fired power plant built by the United Electric Light and Power Company in New York City, on Manhattan Island at 201st Street and the Harlem River. The station supplied power to many customers, including the New York, New Haven and Hartford Railroad via the West Farms Substation.

The station site was bounded by 201st Street to the north, the Harlem River to the East, and Sherman Creek to the South. United Electric Light and Power was later absorbed into Consolidated Edison, and the station was demolished. The site is now occupied by an enclosed ConEd substation.

Aerial photo (says 1951)
