= Generator interlock kit =

Electrical power control device

A generator interlock kit (or just interlock kit) is a device designed to allow safe powering of a home by a portable generator during a power outage. It is a less-expensive alternative to purchasing and installing a dedicated transfer switch. The kit achieves the same function by adding an external interlock onto an existing breaker panel that allows the main breaker to be turned on or one designated load breaker to be turned on, but not both at the same time. The interlocked load breaker is repurposed as the "backfeed" breaker, and a generator is connected to it (wired directly or through a power inlet).

Under normal conditions, the main breaker is on, accepting power from the external mains into the panel, and the backfeed breaker is off, isolating the generator. The external mains feeds the panel, but the panel cannot backfeed the generator. Experts have warned not to backfeed a generator, because it serves no purpose and risks damaging the generator.

In generator mode, the backfeed breaker is on, accepting power from the generator into the panel, and the main breaker is off, isolating the external mains. The generator feeds the home by backfeeding the panel, but the panel cannot backfeed the external mains. Backfeeding the external mains is unsafe and illegal, because it can potentially electrocute lineworkers, start fires, and overload or damage the generator.

== Installation and Operation ==
Early generator interlock kits consisted of two sliding steel or plastic (depending on the brand) plates held together by three bolts and installed on the front cover of the home's breaker panel, however, some models made by Eaton (formerly Cutler-Hammer) and Siemens for panels manufactured by them install on the adjacent circuit breakers themselves and consist of a sliding arm for breakers installed back-to-back or a pivoting arm for breakers that are installed side-by-side or one above the other, these arrangements remain on the breakers even if the panel cover is removed as opposed to the mechanisms installed on the panel covers. When the main breaker is turned on, the plate or pivot arm blocks the generator backfeed circuit breaker and allows the main breaker to remain on. Conversely, when the generator backfeed circuit breaker is turned on, the main circuit breaker is blocked and will remain off. The generator backfeed circuit breaker is connected to a generator inlet installed (preferably) on the outside of the structure. A short cord connects the generator to the house inlet, usually through a twistlock plug and socket.

== Advantages ==
- A generator interlock kit (or a transfer switch), eliminates the need for extension cords to power appliances.
- Like a transfer switch, an interlock kit lets the generator energize the panel and all of its circuits (up to the load capacity of the generator); not just corded appliances.
- An interlock kit does not require a separate panel to operate; it is installed directly on the home's breaker panel (provided it has an unused 2-pole breaker slot available).

== Disadvantages ==
- Even though many are tested by an independent lab to a UL standard, they do not carry the UL Listing mark. Without a UL Listing, some electrical inspectors will not allow the use of these interlock kits.
- With kits installed on the electrical panel's cover, removing the cover could allow the generator backfeed breaker to be turned on while the main is on, potentially energizing power lines or overloading the generator, if the generator is connected.
- In some applications, installing an interlock kit requires drilling holes in the panel cover; once it is installed, it cannot be removed.
- Because the main breaker is shut off, homeowners have no way of knowing when utility power is restored, except by manually turning the generator's breaker off and the main breaker back on. However there is at least one product that will produce an audible alert indicating that utility power is restored.
- Installing an interlock kit uses two or three spaces in the existing breaker panel.

== See also ==
- Building Code
- Engine-generator
- Transfer switch
- UL (safety organization)
