= Diesel generator =

Combination of a diesel engine with an electrical generator

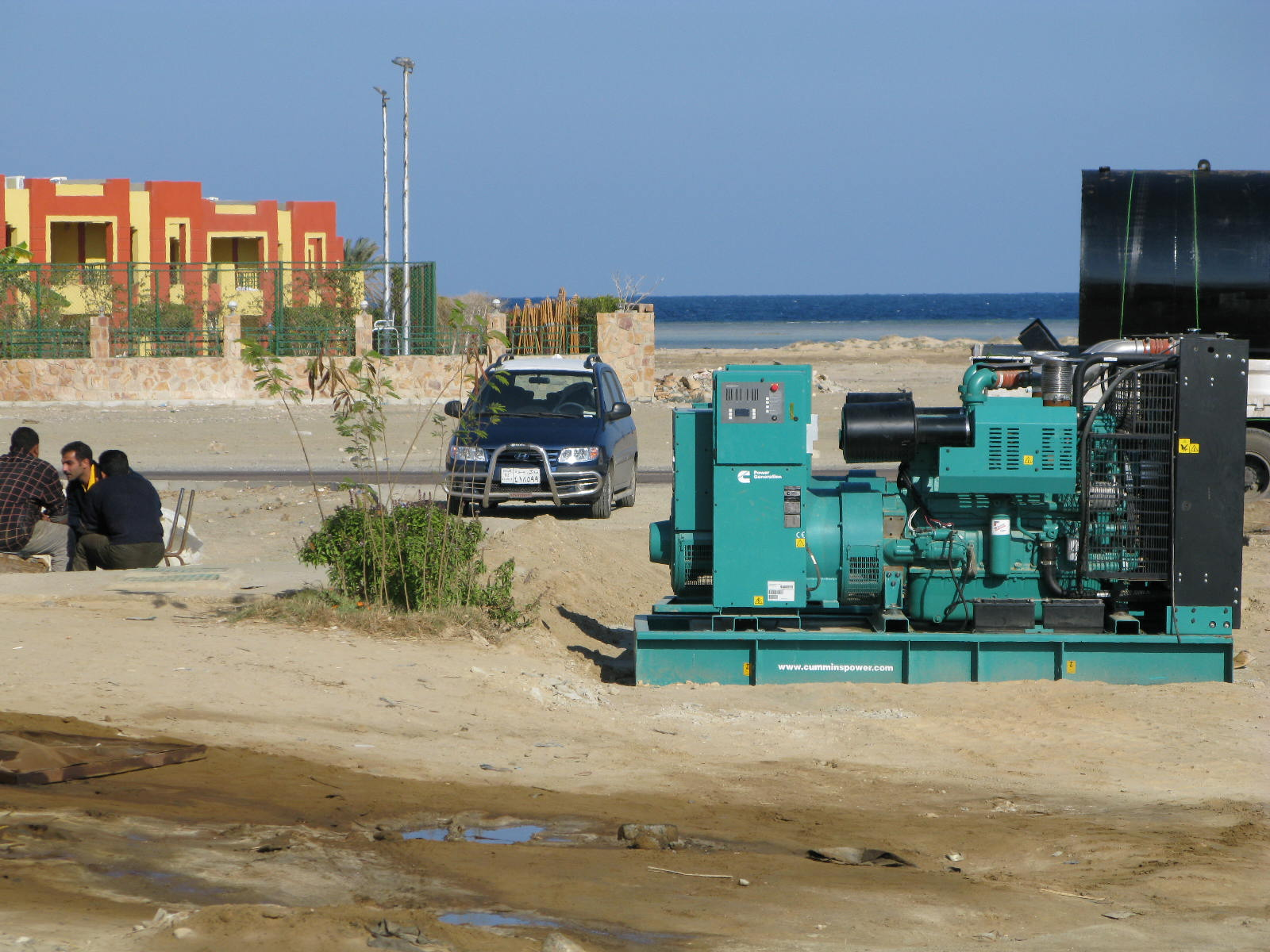
A diesel generator of 150 kVA temporarily parked in a tourist resort in Egypt

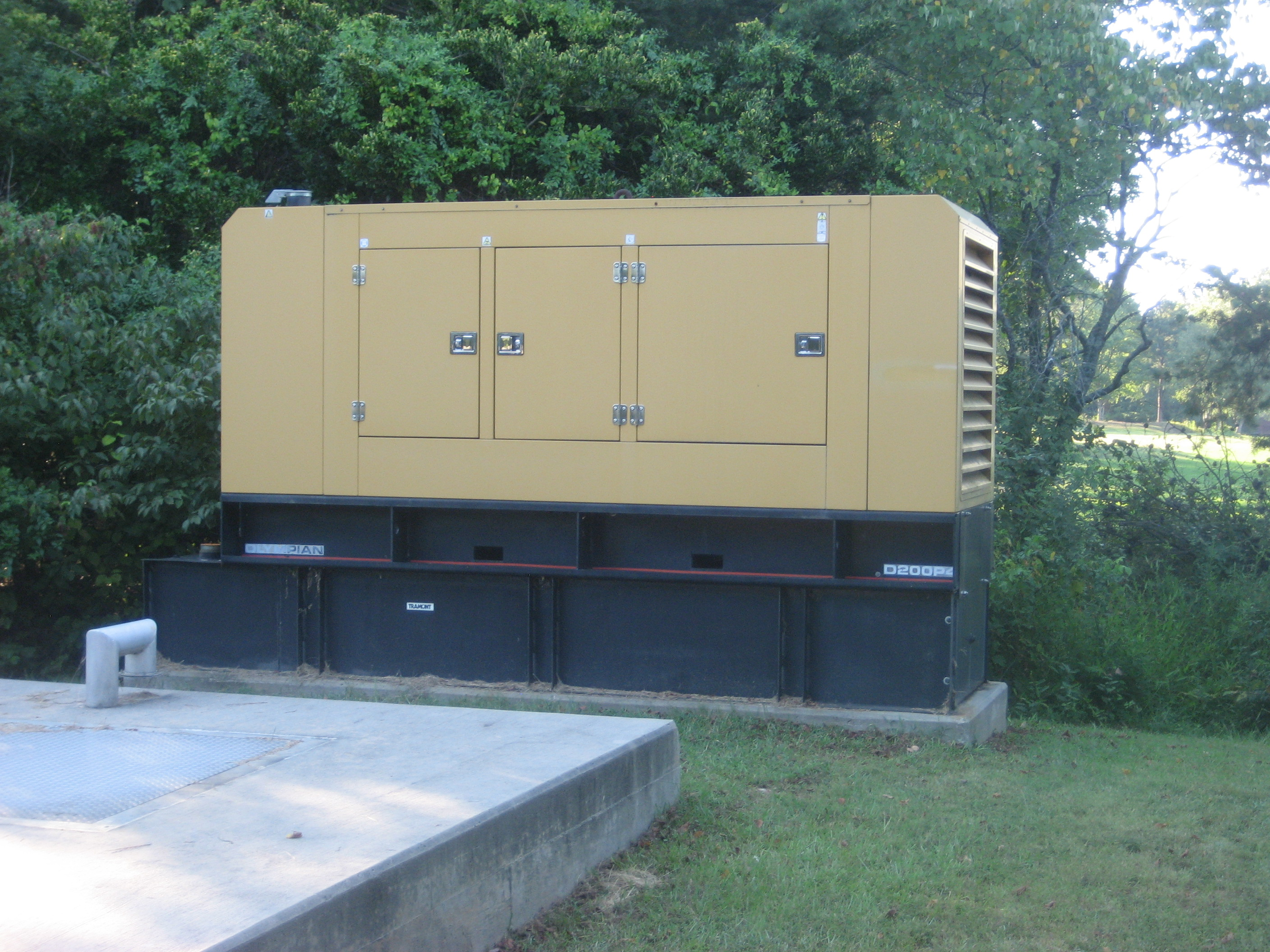
A 200 kW diesel generator set in a sound attenuated enclosure used as an emergency backup at a sewage treatment substation in Atlanta, United States

A diesel generator (DG) (also known as a diesel genset) is the combination of a diesel engine with an electric generator (often an alternator) to generate electrical energy. This is a specific case of an engine generator. A diesel compression-ignition engine is usually designed to run on diesel fuel, but some types are adapted for other liquid fuels or natural gas (CNG).

Diesel generating sets are used in places without connection to a power grid or as an emergency power supply if the grid fails, as well as for more complex applications such as peak-lopping, grid support, and export to the power grid.

Diesel generator size is crucial to minimize low load or power shortages. Sizing is complicated by the characteristics of modern electronics, specifically non-linear loads. Its size ranges around 50 MW and above, an open cycle gas turbine is more efficient at full load than an array of diesel engines, and far more compact, with comparable capital costs; but for regular part-loading, even at these power levels, diesel arrays are sometimes preferred to open cycle gas turbines, due to their superior efficiencies.

Diesel generators provide a semi-continuous flow of electricity through a power Outlet.

== Diesel generator set ==
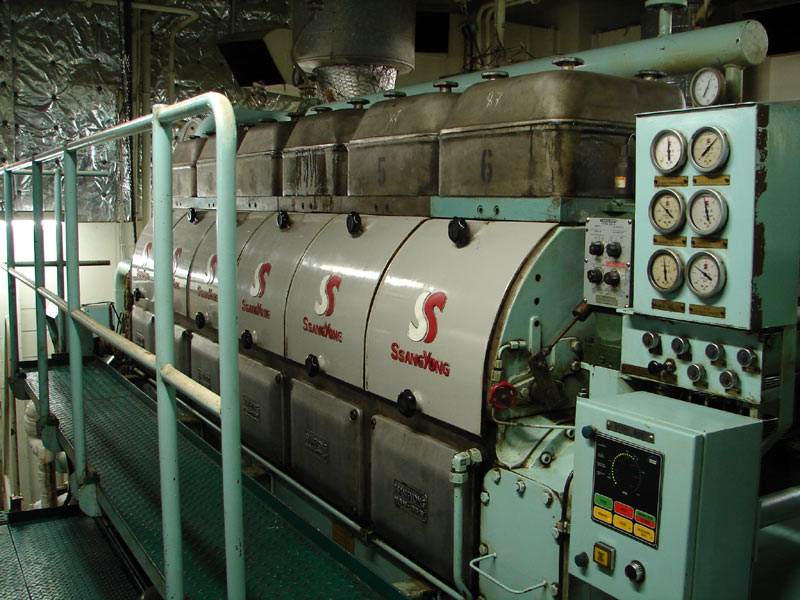
Diesel generator on an oil tanker

The packaged combination of a diesel engine, a generator, and various auxiliary devices (such as a base, canopy, sound attenuation, control systems, circuit breakers, jacket water heaters, and starting system) is referred to as a "generating set" or a "genset" for short.

Set sizes range from 8 to 30-kW (also 8 to 30-kVA single phase) for homes, small shops, and offices, with the larger industrial generators from 8-kW (11 kVA) up to 2,000-kW (2,500-kVA three phase) used for office complexes, factories, and other industrial facilities. A 2,000-kW set can be housed in a 40 ft (12 m) ISO container with a fuel tank, controls, power distribution equipment, and all other equipment needed to operate as a standalone power station or as a standby backup to grid power. These units, referred to as power modules, are gensets on large triple axle trailers weighing 85,000 pounds (38,555 kg) or more.

A combination of these modules is used for small power stations, and these may use from one to 20 units per power section, these sections can be combined to involve hundreds of power modules. In these larger sizes, the power modules (engine and generator) are brought to the site on trailers separately and are connected with large cables and a control cable to form a complete synchronized power plant. Several options also exist to tailor specific needs, including control panels for AutoStart and mains paralleling, acoustic canopies for fixed or mobile applications, ventilation equipment, fuel supply systems, exhaust systems, etc.

Diesel generators are not only for emergency power but may also have a secondary function of feeding power to utility grids either during peak periods or periods when there is a shortage of large power generators. In the UK, this program is run by the national grid and is called STOR.

Ships often also employ diesel generators, sometimes not only to provide auxiliary power for lights, fans, etc. but also indirectly for main propulsion. With electric propulsion, the generators can be placed in a convenient position, to allow more cargo to be carried. Electric drives for ships were developed before World War I. Electric drives were specified in many warships built during World War II because manufacturing capacity for large reduction gears was in short supply, compared to the capacity for the manufacture of electrical equipment. Such a diesel-electric arrangement is also used in some very large land vehicles, such as railroad locomotives.

== Generator size ==
Generating sets are selected based on the electrical load they are intended to supply, the electrical load's characteristics, such as kW, kVA, var, harmonic content, surge currents (e.g., motor starting current), and non-linear loads. The expected duty (such as emergency, prime, or continuous power), as well as environmental conditions (such as altitude, temperature, and exhaust emissions regulations), must also be considered.

Most of the larger generator set manufacturers offer software that will perform the complicated sizing calculations by simply inputting site conditions and connected electrical load characteristics.

== Power plants – electrical "island" mode ==
One or more diesel generators operating without a connection to an electrical grid are referred to as operating in island mode. Operating generators in parallel provides the advantage of redundancy and can provide better efficiency at partial loads. The plant brings generator sets online and takes them offline depending on the demands of the system at a given time. An islanded power plant intended for a primary power source of an isolated community will often have at least three diesel generators, any two of which are rated to carry the required load. Groups of up to 20 are not uncommon.

Generators can be electrically connected through the process of synchronization. Synchronization involves matching voltage, frequency, and phase before connecting the generator to the system. Failure to synchronize before a connection could cause a high short circuit current or wear and tear on the generator or its switchgear. The synchronization process can be done automatically by an auto-synchronizer module, or manually by the instructed operator. The auto-synchronizer will read the voltage, frequency, and phase parameters from the generator and busbar voltages, while regulating the speed through the engine governor or ECM (Engine Control Module).

The load can be shared among parallel-running generators through load sharing. Load sharing can be achieved by using droop speed control controlled by the frequency at the generator, while it constantly adjusts the engine fuel control to shift load to and from the remaining power sources. A diesel generator will take more load when the fuel supply to its combustion system is increased, while the load is released if the fuel supply is decreased.

== Supporting main utility grids ==
In addition to their well-known role as power supplies during power failures, diesel generator sets also routinely support main power grids worldwide in two distinct ways:

=== Grid support ===
Emergency standby diesel generators, such as those used in hospitals and water plants, are, as a secondary function, widely used in the US and, in the recent past, in Great Britain to support the respective national grids at times for a variety of reasons. In the UK, the tenders known as the Short Term Operating Reserve have exhibited quite variable prices, and from 2012 on, the volume of demand-side participation, which mainly entails the use of on-site diesel, has dropped as the tendered prices fell. Some 0.5-GW of diesel have at times been used to support the National Grid, whose peak load is about 60 GW. These are sets in the size range of 200-kW to 2 MW. This usually occurs during, for example, the sudden loss of a large conventional 660-MW plant, or a sudden unexpected rise in power demand eroding the normal spinning reserve available.

This is beneficial for both parties - the diesels have already been purchased for other reasons, but to be reliable need to be fully load tested. Grid paralleling is a convenient way of doing this. This method of operation is normally undertaken by a third-party aggregator who manages the operation of the generators and the interaction with the system operator.

These diesels can in some cases be up and running in parallel as quickly as two minutes, with no impact on the site (the office or factory need not shut down). This is far quicker than a base load power station which can take 12 hours from cold, and faster than a gas turbine, which can take several minutes. Whilst diesel is very expensive in fuel terms, they are only used a few hundred hours per year in this duty, and its availability can prevent the need for a base load station running inefficiently at partial load continuously. The diesel fuel used is the fuel that would have been used in testing anyway.

In Great Britain, National Grid can generally rely upon about 2 GW of customer demand reduction via backup diesel being self-dispatched for about 10 to 40 hours a year at times of expected peak national demand. National Grid does not control these diesels - they are run by the customer to avoid "triad" transmission network use of system (TNUoS) charges, which are levied only on consumption of each site, at the three half-hours of peak national demand. It is not known in advance when the three half-hours of peak national demand (the "triad" periods) will be, so the customer must run his diesel for a good deal more half-hours a year than just three.

The total capacity of reliably operable standby generation in Britain is estimated to be around 20 GW, nearly all of which is driven by diesel engines. This is equivalent to nearly 29% of the British system peak, although only a very small fraction will ever be generated at the same time. Most plants are for large office blocks, hospitals, supermarkets, and various installations where continuous power is important such as airports. Therefore, most are in urban areas, particularly city and commercial centers. It is estimated that around 10% of the plant exceeds 1-MW, about 50% is in the 200-kW-1-MW range, and the remaining 40% is sub-200-kW. Although it is growing, only a very small proportion is believed to be used regularly for peak lopping, the vast majority just being only for standby generation. The information in this paragraph is sourced from section 6.9 of the government report: "Overcoming Barriers To Scheduling Embedded Generation to Support Distribution Networks"

Increasing use of banks of diesel generators (known as "diesel farms") is being made in Britain to balance the fluctuating output from renewable energy sources, such as wind farms.

A similar system to Great Britain's Short-Term Operating Reserve operates in France. It is known as EJP; at times of grid stress, special tariffs can mobilize at least 5 GW of diesel-generating sets to become available. In this case, the diesel's prime function is to feed power into the grid.

During normal operation in synchronization with the electricity net, powerplants are governed with a five percent droop speed control. This means the full load speed is 100% and the no-load speed is 105%. This is required for the stable operation of the net without hunting and dropouts of power plants. Normally the speed changes are minor. Adjustments in power output are made by slowly raising the droop curve by increasing the spring pressure on a centrifugal governor. Generally, this is a basic system requirement for all power plants because the older and newer plants have to be compatible in response to the instantaneous changes in frequency without depending on outside communication.

== Cost of generating electricity ==
=== Typical operating costs ===
Fuel consumption is the major portion of diesel plant owning and operating costs for power applications, whereas capital cost is the primary concern for backup generators. Specific consumption varies, but a modern diesel plant will, at its near-optimal 65-70% loading, generate at least 3 kWh per liter (ca. 30% fuel efficiency ratio).

== Generator sizing and rating ==
=== Rating ===
Generators must provide the anticipated power required reliably and without damage and this is achieved by the manufacturer giving one or more ratings to a specific generator set model. A specific model of a generator operated as a standby generator may only need to operate for a few hours per year, but the same model operated as a prime power generator must operate continuously. When running, the standby generator may be operated with a specified - e.g. 10% overload that can be tolerated for the expected short running time. The same model generator will carry a higher rating for standby service than it will for continuous duty. Manufacturers give each set a rating based on internationally agreed definitions.

These standard rating definitions are designed to allow valid comparisons among manufacturers, prevent manufacturers from miss rating their machines, and guide designers.

Generator rating definitions

Standby Rating based on: Applicable for supplying emergency power for the duration of normal power interruption. No sustained overload capability is available for this rating (equivalent to Fuel Stop Power by ISO3046, AS2789, DIN6271 and BS5514). Nominally rated.

Typical application - emergency power plants in hospitals, offices, factories, etc. Not connected to the grid.

Prime (Unlimited Running Time) Rating: Should not be used for construction power applications. Output is available with varying loads for an unlimited time. Typical peak demand is 100% of prime-rated ekW with 10% overload capability for emergency use for a maximum of 1 hour in 12. A 10% overload capability is available for a limited time (equivalent to Prime Power by ISO8528 and Overload Power by ISO3046, AS2789, DIN6271, and BS5514). This rating does not apply to all generator set models.

Typical application - where the generator is the sole source of power for say a remote mining or construction site, fairground, festival etc.

Base Load (Continuous) Rating based on: Applicable for supplying power continuously to a constant load up to the full output rating for unlimited hours. No sustained overload capability is available for this rating. Consult an authorized distributor for rating (equivalent to Continuous Power by ISO8528, ISO3046, AS2789, DIN6271, and BS5514). This rating does not apply to all generator set models.

Typical application - a generator running a continuous unvarying load, or paralleled with the mains and continuously feeding power at the maximum permissible level of 8,760 hours per year. This also applies to sets used for peak saving and/or grid support, even though this may only occur for, say, 200 hours per year.

As an example, if in a particular set, the Standby Rating was 1000 kW, then a Prime Power rating might be 850 kW, and the Continuous Rating 800 kW. However, these ratings vary according to the manufacturer and should be taken from the manufacturer's datasheet.

Often a set might be given all three ratings stamped on the data plate, but sometimes it may have only a standby rating or only a prime rating.

=== Sizing ===
Typically, however, it is the size of the maximum load that has to be connected and the acceptable maximum voltage drop that determines the set size, not the ratings themselves. If the set is required to start motors, then the set will have to be at least three times the largest motor, which is normally started first. This means it will be unlikely to operate anywhere near the ratings of the chosen set.

Many genset manufacturers have software programs that enable the correct choice of a set for any given load combination. Sizing is based on site conditions and the type of appliances, equipment, and devices that will be powered by the generator set.

== Fuels ==
Diesel fuel is named after diesel engines, and not vice versa; diesel engines are simply compression-ignition engines and can operate on a variety of different fuels, depending on configuration and location. Where a gas grid connection is available, gas is often used, as the gas grid will remain pressurized during almost all power cuts. This is implemented by introducing gas with the intake air and using a small amount of diesel fuel for ignition. Conversion to 100% diesel fuel operation can be achieved instantaneously.

In more rural situations, or for low load factor plants, diesel fuel derived from crude oil is a common fuel; it is less likely to freeze than heavier oils. Endurance will be limited by tank size. Diesel engines can work with the full spectrum of crude oil distillates, from natural gas, alcohols, gasoline, and wood gas, to fuel oils, from diesel oil to cheaper residual fuels that are like lard at room temperature, and must be heated to enable them to flow down a fuel line.

Larger engines (from about 3 MWe to 30 MWe) sometimes use heavy oils, essentially tars, derived from the end of the refining process. The slight added complexity of keeping the fuel oil heated to enable it to flow, whilst mitigating the fire risks that come from over-heating fuel, makes these fuels unpopular for smaller, often unmanned, generating stations.

Other possible fuels include biodiesel, vegetable oil, animal fats and tallows, glycerine, and coal-water slurry. These should be used with caution; because of their composition, the engine must be properly adjusted or they have a detrimental effect on engine life. For example, engines using coal-water slurry are often modified with larger injectors to permit the higher-density fuel to be injected in the short fraction of a second time needed. Other high-viscosity fuels like tallow, vegetable oil, or paraffin wax can be used with standard fuel injectors if the fuel is preheated to reduce its viscosity to the range of standard diesel fuel. The engine designed by and built by Rudolf Diesel for the 1900 World's Fair was fueled with peanut oil rather than a petroleum product like most modern engines using his system.

== See also ==
- Calculating the cost of the UK Transmission network: cost per kWh of transmission
- Calculating the cost of back up: See spark spread
- Diesel electric multiple unit
- Energy use and conservation in the United Kingdom
- Engine-generator
- Electric generator
- Head-end power
- Load management
- Motor–generator
- Single-phase generator
- Standby generator
- Stationary engine
- Three-phase electric power
- Wet stacking
