= Engine–generator =

Combination of an electrical generator and an engine in a single part

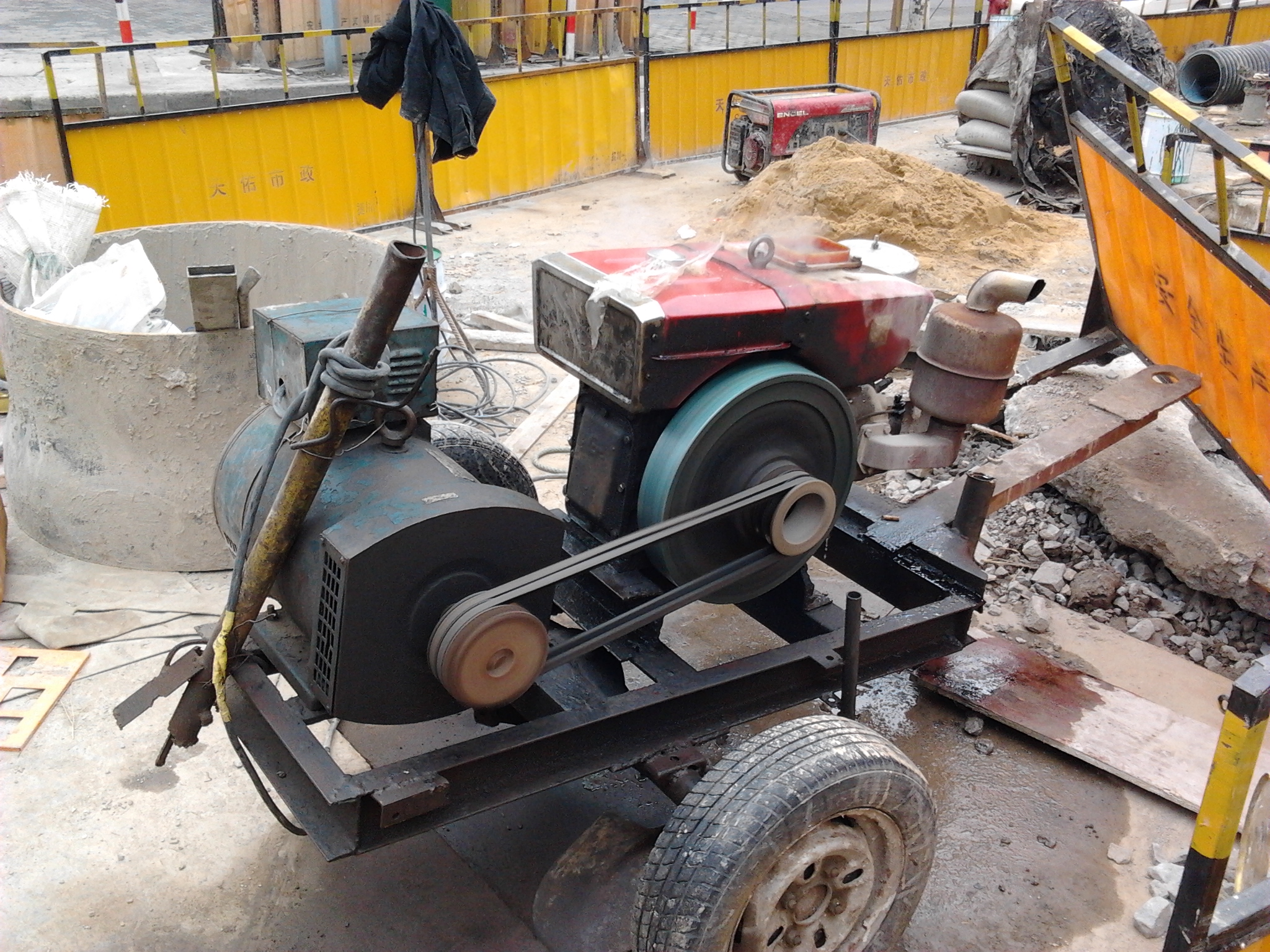
Cart-mounted engine–generator being used at a construction site

An engine–generator is the combination of an electrical generator and an engine (prime mover) mounted together to form a single piece of equipment. This combination is also called an engine–generator set or a gen-set. In many contexts, the engine is taken for granted and the combined unit is simply called a generator. An engine–generator may be a fixed installation, part of a vehicle, or made small enough to be portable.

== Components ==
In addition to the engine and generator, engine–generators generally include a fuel supply, a constant engine speed regulator (governor) in diesel and a generator voltage regulator, cooling and exhaust systems, and lubrication system. Units larger than about 1 kW rating often have a battery and electric starter motor; very large units may start with compressed air supplied either to an air-driven starter motor or introduced directly to the engine cylinders to initiate engine rotation. Standby power generating units often include an automatic starting system and a transfer switch to disconnect the load from the utility power source when there is a power failure and connect it to the generator.

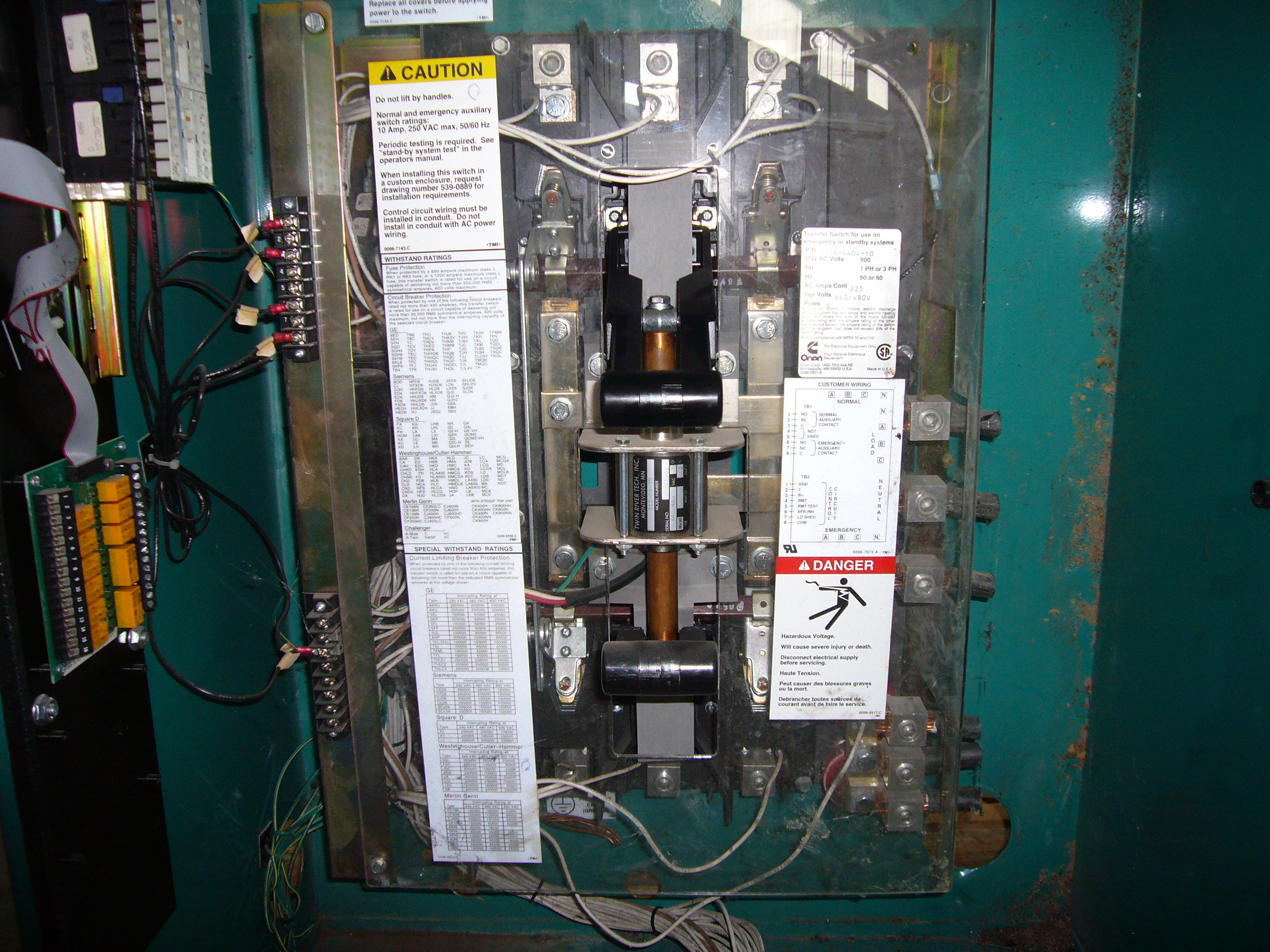
A Cummins Onan transfer switch

== Overview ==
Engine–generators are available in a wide range of power ratings. These include small, hand-portable units that can supply several hundred watts of power, hand-cart mounted units that can supply several thousand watts and stationary or trailer-mounted units that can supply over a million watts. Regardless of the size, generators may run on gasoline, diesel, natural gas, propane, bio-diesel, water, sewage gas or hydrogen. Most of the smaller units are built to use gasoline (petrol) as a fuel, and the larger ones have various fuel types, including diesel, natural gas and propane (liquid or gas). Some engines may also operate on diesel and gas simultaneously (bi-fuel operation).

=== Prime mover ===
==== Engines ====
Many engine–generators use a reciprocating engine, with fuels mentioned above. This can be a steam engine, such as most coal-powered fossil-fuel power plants use. Some engine–generators use a turbine as the engine, such as the industrial gas turbines used in peaking power plants and the microturbines used in some hybrid electric buses.

The generator voltage (volts), frequency (Hz) and power (watts) ratings are selected to suit the load that will be connected. Portable engine–generators may require an external power conditioner to safely operate some types of electronic equipment.

Engine-driven generators fueled on natural gas often form the heart of small-scale (less than 1,000 kW) combined heat and power installations.

=== Output type ===
==== Three phase ====
There are only a few portable three-phase generator models available in the US. Most of the portable units available are single-phase generators and most of the three-phase generators manufactured are large industrial type generators. In other countries where three-phase power is more common in households, portable generators are available from a few kW and upwards.

==== Inverter generator ====
Small portable generators may use an inverter. Inverter models can run at slower RPMs to generate the power that is necessary, thus reducing the noise of the engine and making it more fuel-efficient. Inverter generators are best to power sensitive electronic devices such as computers and lights that use a ballast, as they have a low total harmonic distortion.

Since the load on the electric generator causes the speed of the engine to fall, this has an adverse effect on the frequency and voltage of the electrical output. By using an electronic inverter to produce the required AC output, its voltage and frequency can be stable over the power range of the generator.

Another advantage is that the generated electric power from the engine-driven generator can be a polyphase output at a higher frequency and at a waveform more suitable for rectification to produce the DC to feed the inverter. This reduces the weight and size of the unit.

A typical modern inverter–generator produces 3kVA and weighs c. 26 kg making it convenient for handling by one person.

=== Size ===
==== Mid-size stationary engine–generator ====
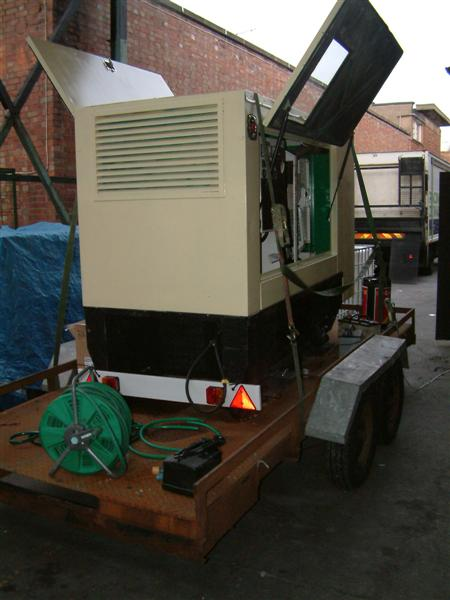
Side view of a large Perkins diesel generator, manufactured by FG Wilson (Engineering) Ltd. This is a 100 kVA set

The mid-size stationary engine–generator pictured here is a 100 kVA set which produces 415 V at around 110 A. It is powered by a 6.7-liter turbocharged Perkins Phaser 1000 Series engine, and consumes approximately 27 liters of fuel an hour, on a 400-liter tank. Diesel engines in the UK can run on red diesel and rotate at 1,500 or 3,000 rpm. This produces power at 50 Hz, which is the frequency used in Europe. In regions where the frequency is 60 Hz such as in North America, generators rotate at 1,800 rpm or another divisor of 3600. Diesel engine–generator sets operated at their peak efficiency point can produce between 3 and 4 kilowatt hours of electrical energy for each liter of diesel fuel consumed, with lower efficiency at partial loads.

==== Large scale generator sets ====
Many generators produce enough kilowatts to power anything from a business to a full-sized hospital. These units are particularly useful in providing backup power solutions for companies which have serious economic costs associated with a shutdown caused by an unplanned power outage. For example, a hospital is in constant need of electricity, because several life-preserving medical devices run on electricity, like ventilators.

A very common use is a railway diesel electric locomotive, some units having over 4,000 hp (2,983 kW).

Large generators are also used on board ships that utilize a diesel-electric powertrain. Voltages and frequencies may vary in different installations. MegaWatt-sized generators mounted on a ship's propeller shaft can be more efficient than onboard diesel-electric generators.

== Applications ==
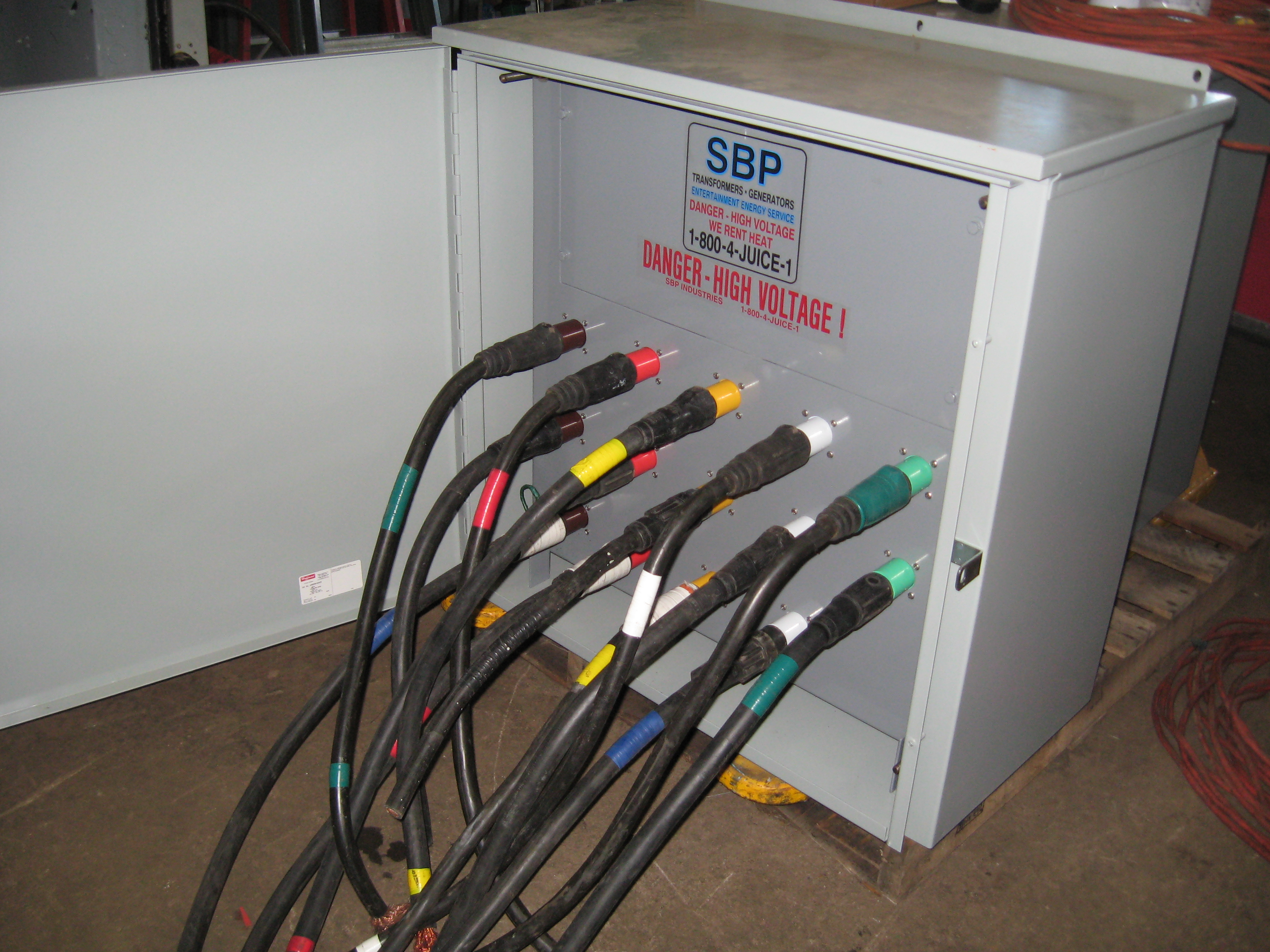
Generator tie-in panel 1200-amp outdoor enclosure

Engine–generators are used to provide electrical power in areas where utility (central station) electricity is unavailable, or where electricity is only needed temporarily. Small generators are sometimes used to provide electricity to power tools at construction sites. Trailer-mounted generators supply temporary installations of lighting, sound amplification systems, amusement rides, etc. A wattage chart can be used to calculate the estimated power usage for different types of equipment to determine how many watts are necessary for a portable generator.

Trailer-mounted generators or mobile generators, diesel generators are also used for emergencies or backup where either a redundant system is required or no generator is on-site. To make the hookup faster and safer, a tie-in panel is frequently installed near the building switchgear that contains connectors such as camlocks. The tie-in panel may also contain a phase rotation indicator (for 3-phase systems) and a circuit breaker. Camlock connectors are rated for 400 amps up to 480-volt systems and used with 4/0 type W cable connecting to the generator. Tie-in panel designs are common between 200- and 3000-amp applications.

Standby electrical generators are permanently installed and used to immediately provide electricity to critical loads during temporary interruptions of the utility power supply. Hospitals, communications service installations, data processing centers, sewage pumping stations, and many other important facilities are equipped with standby power generators. Some standby power generators can automatically detect the loss of grid power, start the motor, run using fuel from a natural gas line, detect when grid power is restored, and then turn itself off—with no human interaction.

Privately owned generators are especially popular in areas where grid power is undependable or unavailable. Trailer-mounted generators can be towed to disaster areas where grid power has been temporarily disrupted.

== Safety ==
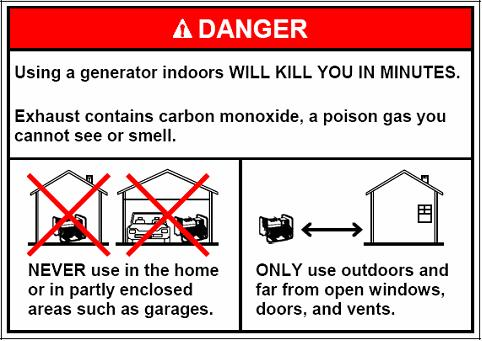
Some generators include a warning stating "Using a generator indoors will kill you in minutes"

Every year, incorrectly used portable generators result in deaths from carbon monoxide poisoning. As a result, authorities and experts have warned not to run generators indoors, garages, or any partially enclosed spaces (also extends to basements, crawlspaces, sheds, enclosures, compartments, or near any windows, doors, air intake vents or other openings); even if ventilation measures are taken (i.e., opening windows, doors, or vents). A 5.5 kW portable generator will generate the same amount of carbon monoxide as six cars, which can quickly build up to fatal levels if the generator has been placed indoors. Using portable generators in garages, or near open windows or air conditioning vents can also result in carbon monoxide poisoning.

Additionally, backfeeding is also another common danger when using a portable engine generator, which can harm utility workers or people in other buildings, and is also illegal. Because of this, experts have warned not to plug generators directly into a wall outlet. Before turning on a diesel- or gasoline-powered generator, it has been advised that users make sure that the main breaker is in the "off" position, to ensure that the electric current does not reverse.

Exhausting extremely hot flue gases from gen-sets can be done by factory-built positive pressure chimneys (certified to UL 103 test standard) or general utility schedule 40 black iron pipe. It has been recommended to use insulation to reduce pipe skin temperature and reduce excessive heat gain into the mechanical room. There are also excessive pressure relief valves available to relieve the pressure from potential backfires and to maintain the integrity of the exhaust pipe.

== See also ==
- Diesel electric locomotive
- Diesel electric multiple unit
- Diesel generator
- Electric generator
- Fuel cell
- Head end power
- Motor–generator
- Standby generator
- Stationary engine
