= Continual power system =

System for supplying uninterrupted power

A continual power system is a system for reliably supplying uninterrupted power. Examples of a continual power system include uninterruptible power supplies and emergency power systems. The need for continual power systems has risen because more and more essential services depend on consistent power, such as lighting, computing, and communications.

Continual power systems are used because energy provider's roles and responsibilities are not rigorously defined.

The key to reliable power systems is to avoid power disturbances, such as deviation of voltage or current in an ideal single-frequency sine wave with constant amplitude and frequency.

In a study conducted in 2011 with Flemish households, researchers found that a relatively small share were willing to accept lower reliability in return for a small bill discount.

== Flywheel ==
An example of a continual power system is the flywheel, which is common on colocation sites. These consist of an electric motor, a flywheel, a generator, and a diesel engine. In normal operation, the electric motor, supplied from the grid, turns the flywheel which in turn, turns the generator. In the event of generator failure, the flywheel keeps the generator turning while the diesel engine restarts. The flywheel is an effective way of governing the Flywheel Energy Storage System (FESS) for wind power smoothing. It stores in the range of 89-93% of the mean state of charge which means that as the blades on the flywheel turn, between 89-93% of the energy is stored.

== Turbines ==
A turbine is a set of blades that are forced to turn by an external energy source. When the blades start turning, the shaft to which they are connected starts to spin, and the generator then creates electricity. Examples of external forces that can power turbines include wind, water, steam, and gas. Turbines can be used in creating a continual power system because as long as the blades turn, power is created.

== Microbial fuel cells ==
Microbial fuel cells create energy when bacteria break down organic material. This produces a charge that is transferred to the cell's anode. Human saliva, which has much organic material, can be used to power a tiny microbial fuel cell. This can produce sufficient energy to run on-chip applications. This application can be used in things such as biomedical devices and cell phones.

A study evaluated microbial fuel cells to create electricity and treat wastewater. During a five-month time period, a sucrose-based solution continuously generated electricity of 170mW/m2. Power density grew with increasing chemical oxygen demand up to 2.0g COD/day with no increase in power density after that. This shows that while this system can continuously provide electricity, it has its limitations.
