= Backfeeding =

Reversed flow of electricity

Backfeeding is the flow of electric power in the direction reverse to that of the generally understood or typical flow of power. Depending on the source of the power, this reverse flow may be intentional or unintentional. If not prevented (in the case of unintentional backfeeding) or properly performed (in cases of intentional backfeeding), backfeeding may present unanticipated hazards to electrical grid equipment and service personnel.

== Types of backfeeding ==
=== Intentional backfeeding ===
Development and economization of consumer power generation equipment such as wind turbines and photovoltaic systems has led to an increase in the number of consumers that may produce more electrical power than they consume during peak generating conditions. If supported by the consumer's electric utility provider, the excess power generated may be fed back into the electrical grid. This process makes the typical consumer a temporary producer while the flow of electrical power remains reversed. When backfeeding is performed this way, electric utility providers will install a specially engineered electrical meter that is capable of net metering.

=== Unintentional backfeeding ===
A common source of unintentional backfeeding is an electrical generator (typically a portable generator) that is improperly connected to a building electrical system. A properly installed electrical generator incorporates the use of a transfer switch or generator interlock kit to ensure the incoming electrical service line is disconnected when the generator is providing power to the building. In the absence (or improper usage) of a transfer switch, unintentional backfeeding may occur when the power provided by the electrical generator is able to flow over the electrical service line. Because an electrical transformer is capable of operating in both directions, electrical power generated from equipment on the consumer's premises can backfeed through the transformer and energize the distribution line to which the transformer is connected.

=== Intrinsic backfeeding ===
Backfeeding also exists in other instances where a location that is typically a generator becomes a consumer. This is commonly seen when an electrical generation plant is shut down or operating at such a reduced capacity that its parasitic load becomes greater than its generated power. The parasitic power load is the result of the usage of: pumps, facility lighting, HVAC equipment, and other control equipment that must remain active regardless of actual electrical power production. Electrical utilities often take steps to decrease their overall parasitic load to minimize this type of backfeeding and improve efficiency.

== Grid design considerations ==
For manufacturing cost and operational simplicity reasons, most circuit (overcurrent) protection and power quality control (voltage regulation) devices used by electric utility companies are designed with the assumption that power always flows in one direction. An interconnection agreement can be arranged for equipment designed to backfeed from the consumer's equipment to the electrical utility provider's distribution system. This type of interconnection can involve nontrivial engineering and usage of costly specialized equipment designed to keep distribution circuits and equipment properly protected. Such costs may be minimized by limiting distributed generation capacity to less than that which is consumed locally, and guaranteeing this condition by installing a reverse-power cutoff relay that opens if backfeeding occurs.

== Safety and operational hazards ==
Because it involves transfer of significant amounts of energy, backfeeding must be carefully controlled and monitored. Personnel working on equipment subject to backfeeding must be aware of all possible power sources, and follow systematic protocols to ensure that equipment is fully de-energized before commencing work, or use special equipment and techniques suitable for working on live equipment.

When working on de-energized power conductors, lineworkers attach temporary protective grounding assemblies or "protective ground sets", which short all conductors to each other and to an earth ground. This ensures that no wires can become energized, whether by accidental switching or by unintentional backfeeding.

Because of the hazards presented by unintentional backfeeding, the usage of equipment that defeats engineered or standardized safety mechanisms such as double-ended power cords (an electrical cord that has a male electrical plug on both ends) is illegal and against the United States National Electrical Code.

== See also ==
- Islanding, a similar phenomenon involving local generators.
- Transfer switch
