= Standby generator =

Type of generator

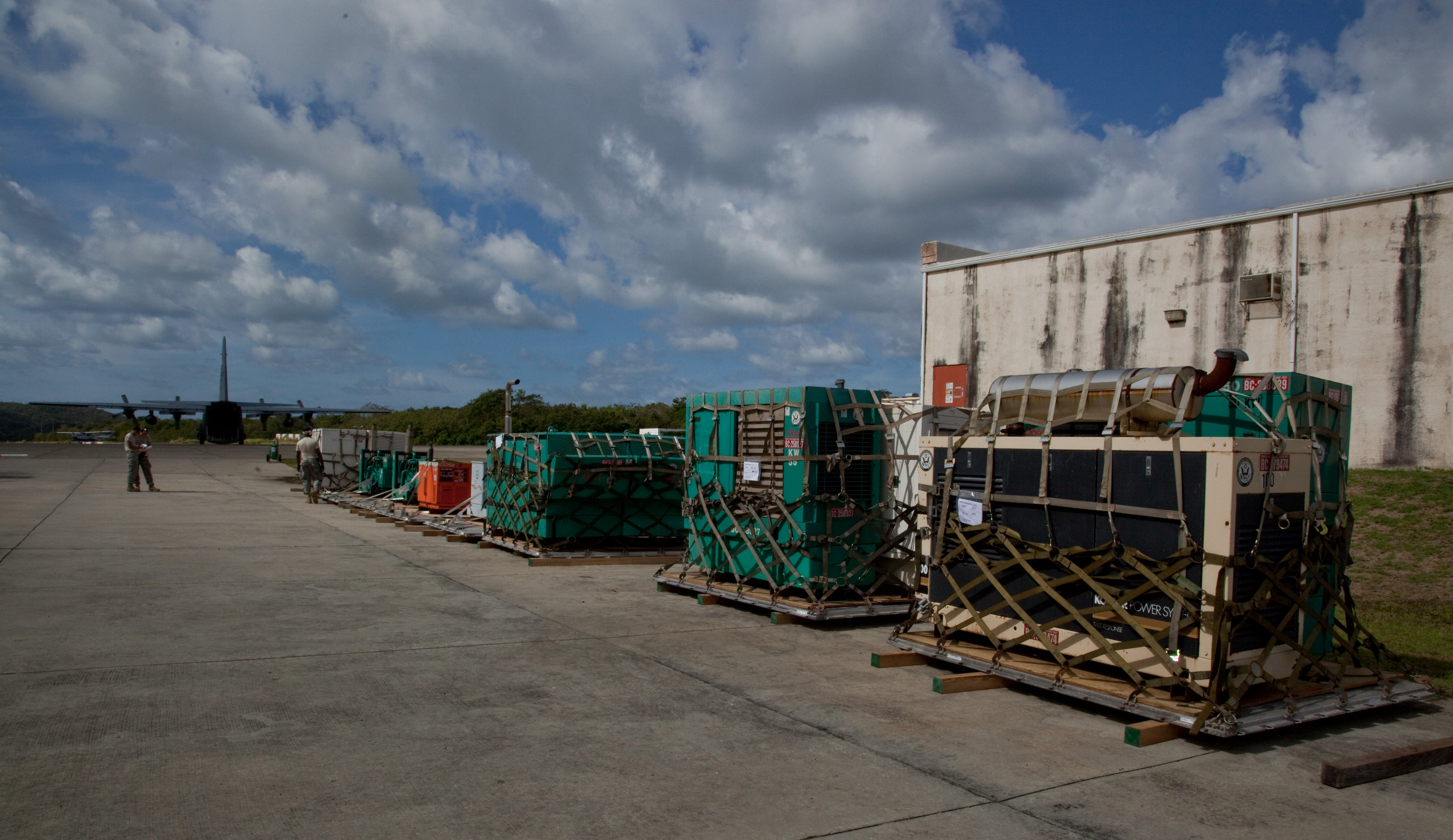
Standby generators

A standby generator is a back-up electrical system that operates automatically. Within seconds of a utility outage an automatic transfer switch senses the power loss, commands the generator to start and then transfers the electrical load to the generator. The standby generator begins supplying power to the circuits. After utility power returns, the automatic transfer switch transfers the electrical load back to the utility and signals the standby generator to shut off automatically. It then returns to standby mode where it awaits the next outage. To ensure a proper response to an outage, a standby generator runs weekly self-tests. Most units run on diesel, natural gas, or liquid propane gas.

Automatic standby generator systems may be required by building codes for critical safety systems such as elevators in high-rise buildings, fire protection systems, standby lighting, or medical and life support equipment.

In 2002, approximately 0.63% of homes in the United States had installed a backup generator; that figure rose to approximately 5.77% by 2023. The wattage of typical whole-home generators varies from 7.5 kW to 26 kW.

== See also ==
- Diesel generator
- Electric generator
- Emergency power system
- Uninterruptible power supply
