= Transfer switch =

Type of electrical switch

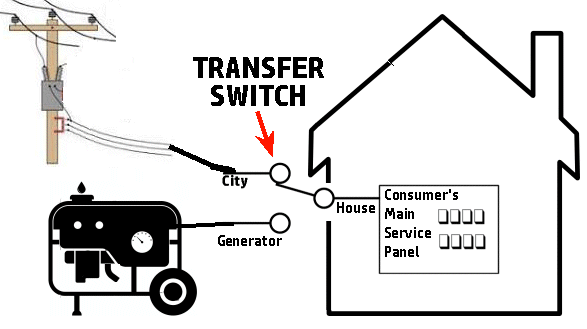
Simplified single line diagram of a single-phase transfer switch to select either 'city' (utility) power or local generator power

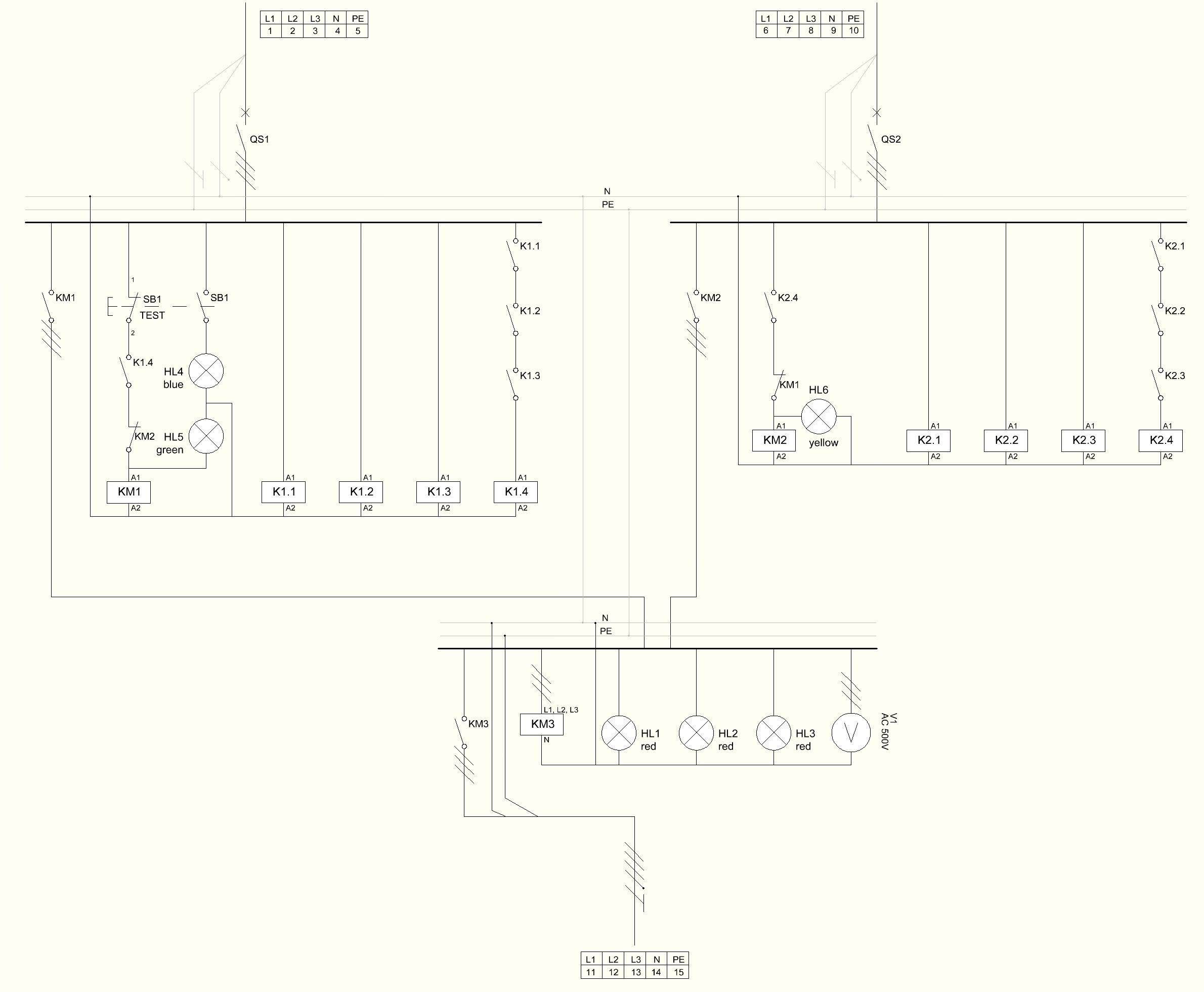
3-phase

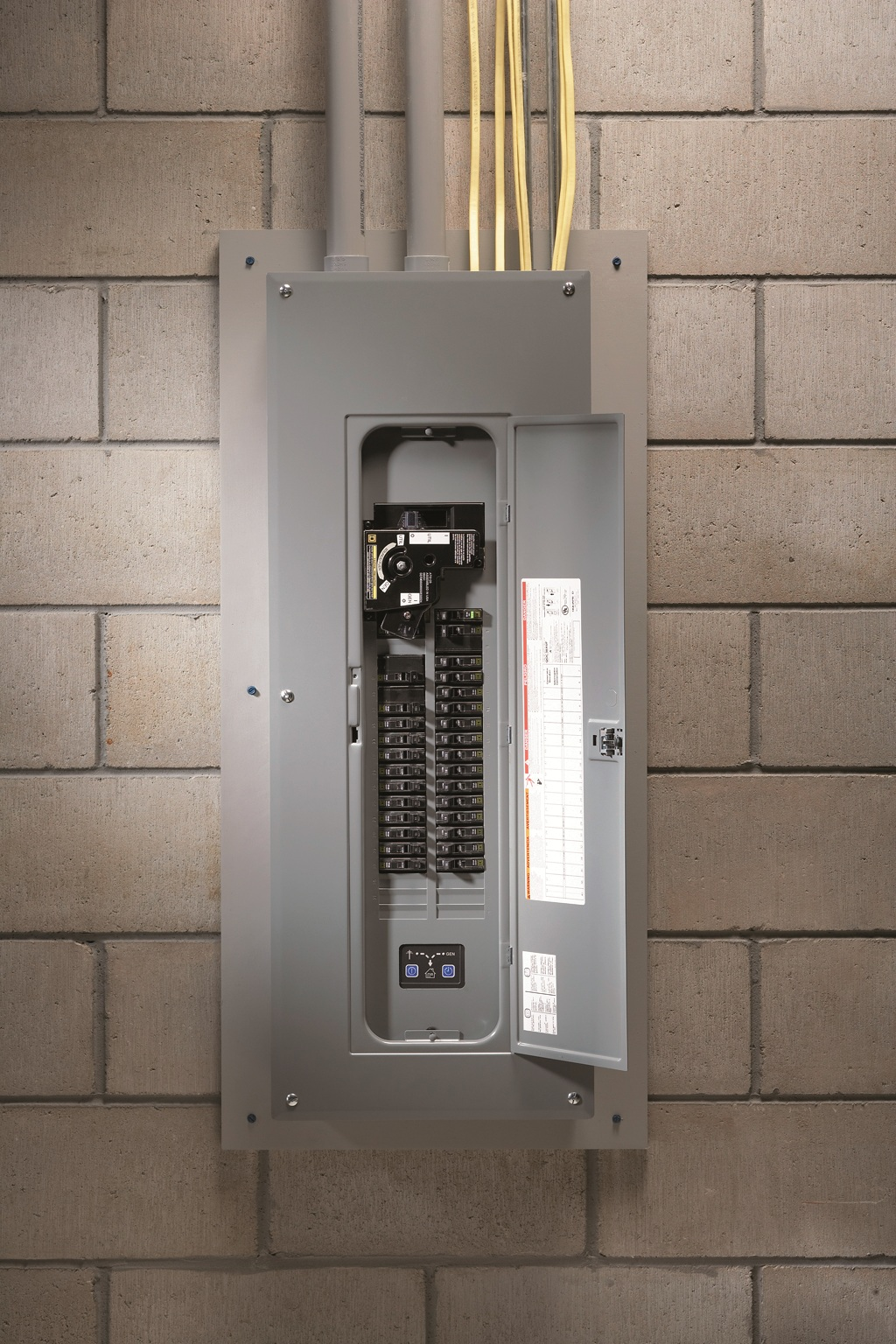
Intelligent transfer switch

A transfer switch is an electrical switch that switches a load between two sources. Some transfer switches are manual, in that an operator effects the transfer by throwing a switch, while others are automatic and trigger when they sense one of the sources has lost or gained power.

An Automatic Transfer Switch (ATS) is often installed where a backup generator is located, so that the generator may provide temporary electrical power if the utility source fails.

== Operation of a transfer switch ==
As well as transferring the load to the backup generator, an ATS may also command the backup generator to start, based on the voltage monitored on the primary supply. The transfer switch isolates the backup generator from the electric utility when the generator is on and providing temporary power. The control capability of a transfer switch may be manual only, or a combination of automatic and manual. The switch transition mode (see below) of a transfer switch may be open transition (the usual type), or closed transition.

For example, in a home equipped with a backup generator and an ATS, when an electric utility outage occurs, the ATS will tell the backup generator to start. Once the ATS sees that the generator is ready to provide electric power, the ATS breaks the home's connection to the electric utility and connects the generator to the home's main electrical panel. The generator supplies power to the home's electric load, but is not connected to the electric utility lines. It is necessary to isolate the generator from the distribution system to protect the generator from overload in powering loads in the house and for safety, as utility workers expect the lines to be dead.

When utility power returns for a minimum time, the transfer switch will transfer the house back to utility power and command the generator to turn off, after another specified amount of "cool down" time with no load on the generator.

A transfer switch can be set up to provide power only to critical circuits or to entire electrical subpanels. Some transfer switches allow for load shedding or prioritization of optional circuits, such as heating and cooling equipment. More complex emergency switchgear used in large backup generator installations permits soft loading, allowing load to be smoothly transferred from the utility to the synchronized generators, and back; such installations are useful for reducing peak load demand from a utility.

== Types ==
=== Open transition ===
An open transition transfer switch is also called a break-before-make transfer switch. A break-before-make transfer switch breaks contact with one source of power before it makes contact with another. It prevents backfeeding from an emergency generator back into the utility line, for example. One example is an open transition automatic transfer switch (ATS). During the split second of the power transfer the flow of electricity is interrupted. Another example is a manual three position switch or circuit breaker, with utility power on one side, the generator on the other, and "off" in the middle, which requires the user to switch through the full disconnect "off" position before making the next connection.

=== Closed transition ===
A closed transition transfer switch (CTTS) is also called a make-before-break transfer switch.

A typical emergency system uses open transition, so there is an inherent momentary interruption of power to the load when it is transferred from one available source to another (keeping in mind that the transfer may be occurring for reasons other than a total loss of power). In most cases this outage is inconsequential, particularly if it is less than 1/6 of a second.

There are some loads, however, that are affected by even the slightest loss of power. There are also operational conditions where it may be desirable to transfer loads with zero interruption of power when conditions permit. For these applications, closed transition transfer switches can be provided. The switch will operate in a make-before-break mode provided both sources are acceptable and synchronized. Typical parameters determining synchronization are: voltage difference less than 5%, frequency difference less than 0.2 Hz, and maximum phase angle between the sources of 5 degrees. This means the engine driving the generator supplying one of the sources generally must be controlled by an isochronous governor.

It is generally required that the closed transition, or overlap time, be less than 100 milliseconds. If either source is not present or not acceptable (such as when normal power fails) the switch must operate in a break-before-make mode (standard open transition operation) to ensure no backfeeding occurs.

Closed transition transfer makes code-mandated monthly testing less objectionable because it eliminates the interruption to critical loads which occurs during traditional open transition transfer.

With closed transition transfer, the on-site engine generator set is momentarily connected in parallel with the utility source. This requires getting approval from the local utility company.

Typical load switching applications for which closed transition transfer is desirable include data processing and electronic loads, certain motor and transformer loads, load curtailment systems, or anywhere load interruptions of even the shortest duration are objectionable. A CTTS is not a substitute for a UPS (uninterruptible power supply); a UPS has a built-in stored energy that provides power for a prescribed period of time in the event of a power failure. A CTTS by itself simply assures there will be no momentary loss of power when the load is transferred from one live power source to another.

=== Soft loading ===
A soft-loading transfer switch (SLTS) makes use of a CTTS, and is commonly used to synchronize and operate onsite generation in parallel with utility power, and to transfer loads between the two sources while minimizing voltage or frequency transients.

=== Static transfer switch (STS) ===
A static transfer switch uses power semiconductors such as Silicon-controlled rectifiers (SCRs) to transfer a load between two sources. Because there are no mechanical moving parts, the transfer can be completed rapidly, perhaps within a quarter-cycle of the power frequency. Static transfer switches can be used where reliable and independent sources of power are available, and it is necessary to protect the load from even a few power frequency cycles interruption time, or from any surges or sags in the prime power source.

== Home use ==
Homes with standby generators may use a transfer switch for a few circuits or the whole home. Different models are available, with both manual and automatic transfer. Often small transfer switch systems use circuit breakers with an external operating linkage as the switching mechanism. The linkage operates two circuit breakers in tandem, closing one while opening the other. Manufacturers of transfer switches can provide installation guides to select the size of switch and provide recommended installation procedures.
