= List of Westinghouse locomotives =

Locomotives built or sold by the Westinghouse Electric Company

Westinghouse's transportation division (rail equipment) was founded 1894 and sold to AEG 1988, later merged into Adtranz, Bombardier and Alstom. Production of locomotives ended after the early 1950s.

== Electric locomotives ==
Usually built in partnership with the Baldwin Locomotive Works, see Baldwin-Westinghouse electric locomotives.

Model	Built year	Total produced	AAR wheel arrangement	Supply voltage	Power output	Image
PRR AA1	1905	2	B-B	600 V DC		
NH EP1	1905–1908	42	1-B-B-1	11 kV, 25 Hz AC; 600 V DC; 636 V AC	1,260 hp (0.94 MW)	
CN Z-2	1907–1908	6	C	3300 V, 25 Hz AC	675 hp (0.50 MW)	
NH 071	1910	1	1-B+B-1	11 kV, 25 Hz AC; 600 V DC	Continuous: 1,432 hp (1.07 MW)	
NH 070	1910	1	1-B+B-1	11 kV, 25 Hz AC; 600 V DC	Continuous: 1,100 hp (0.82 MW)	
Boston and Maine Railroad; Hoosac Tunnel locomotives	1910	5	1-B+B-1	11 kV, 25 Hz AC	Continuous: 1,224 hp (0.91 MW)	
NH 072	1911	1	1-B+B-1	11 kV, 25 Hz AC; 600 V DC	Continuous: 1,240 hp (0.92 MW)	
NH 069	1911	1	1-A-B-A-1	11 kV, 25 Hz AC; 600 V DC	Continuous: 1,336 hp (1.00 MW)	
NH EY2	1911–1927	22	B+B	11 kV, 25 Hz AC	652 hp (0.49 MW)	
NH EF1	1912–1913	39	1-B+B-1	11 kV, 25 Hz AC (1st 3 units also equipped for 600 V DC)	1,600 hp (1.19 MW)	
N&W LC-1	1914–1915	12	(1-B+B-1)+(1-B+B-1)	11 kV, 25 Hz AC	3,211 hp (2.39 MW)	
NH EP-2	1919–1927	27	1-C-1+1-C-1	11 kV, 25 Hz AC; 660 V DC	2,000 hp (1.49 MW)	
MILW EP-3	1919	10	2-C-1+1-C-2	3,000 V DC	Cont: 3,400 hp (2.54 MW), 1 hour: 4,680 hp (3.49 MW)	
CPEF 1B+B1 (Brazil)	1921–1925	3	1B+B1	3,000 V DC	1,800 hp (1.34 MW)	
CPEF C+C (Brazil)	1921–1928	10	C+C	3,000 V DC	1,350 hp (1.01 MW)	
N&W LC-2	1924	4	(1-D-1)+(1-D-1)	11 kV, 25 Hz AC	4,750 hp (3.54 MW)	(ALCO carbody)
DT&I 500-501	1925	2	D+D	22 kV, 25 Hz AC	2,500 hp (1.86 MW)	Motor-Generator (Ford carbody)
VGN EL-3A	1925-6	36	1-B-B-1	11 kV, 25 Hz AC	2,000 hp (1.49 MW)	
GN Z-1	1926-8	10	1-D-1	11 kV, 25 Hz AC	1,830 hp (1.36 MW)	
PRR P5	1931–1935	54	2-C-2	11 kV, 25 Hz AC	3,750 hp (2.80 MW)	
PRR R1	1934	1	2-D-2	11 kV, 25 Hz AC	5,000 hp (3.73 MW)	
NH EF3b	1942	5	2-C+C-2	11 kV, 25 Hz AC	4,860 hp (3.62 MW)	
PRR E3b	1951	2	B-B-B	11 kV, 25 Hz AC	3,000 hp (2.24 MW)	
PRR E2c	1952	2	C-C	11 kV, 25 Hz AC	3,000 hp (2.24 MW)	

== Diesel-electric locomotives ==
Early examples built in partnership with William Beardmore and Company (Beardmore) of Glasgow, Scotland.

Model	Built year	Total produced	AAR wheel arrangement	Prime mover	Power output	Image
"Ike & Mike"	1928	2	B	Beardmore 6 cyl 8¼ × 12	330 hp (250 kW)	
Boxcab	1928–1929	3	B-B	Westinghouse 8¼ × 12	300 hp (220 kW)	
CN 9000	1929	2	2-D-1	Beardmore 12 cyl 12×12	1,330 hp (990 kW)	
"Visibility Cab" switcher	1929–1931	4	B-B	6 cyl 9 × 12	400 horsepower (300 kW)	
"Visibility Cab" switcher	1929–1931	4	B-B	6 cyl Westinghouse 8¼ × 12	300 horsepower (220 kW)	
"Visibility Cab" switcher	1937	3	B-B	6 cyl 9 × 12 supercharged	530 horsepower (400 kW)	
"Visibility Cab" switcher	1930–1935	4	B-B	6 cyl 9 × 12 (×2)	800 horsepower (600 kW)	
Center cab switcher (V12)	1934	1	B-B	V12 9 × 12	800 horsepower (600 kW)	
Center cab roadswitcher (V12)	1935	1	B-B	V12 9 × 12 (×2)	1,600 horsepower (1,190 kW)	
Center cab switcher	1933–1935	4	B-B	4 cyl 265 hp (×2)	530 horsepower (400 kW)	
Illinois Steel Company 50	1931	1	B-B	Westinghouse 8¼ × 12	300 hp (220 kW)	

== Gas Turbine-electric locomotives ==
Model	Built year	Total produced	AAR wheel arrangement	Prime mover	Power output	Image
"Blue Goose"	1950	1	B-B-B-B	Gas Turbine (×2)	4,000 hp (2.98 MW)	

In addition, Westinghouse produced and supplied electrical and traction equipment for Baldwin diesel locomotives from 1939 to 1955 and Lima-Hamilton diesels from 1949-1951 until production at Lima, Ohio ended with the merger into Baldwin. Fairbanks-Morse diesels also used Westinghouse electrical and traction equipment.
