= Elkhorn Grade Electrification =

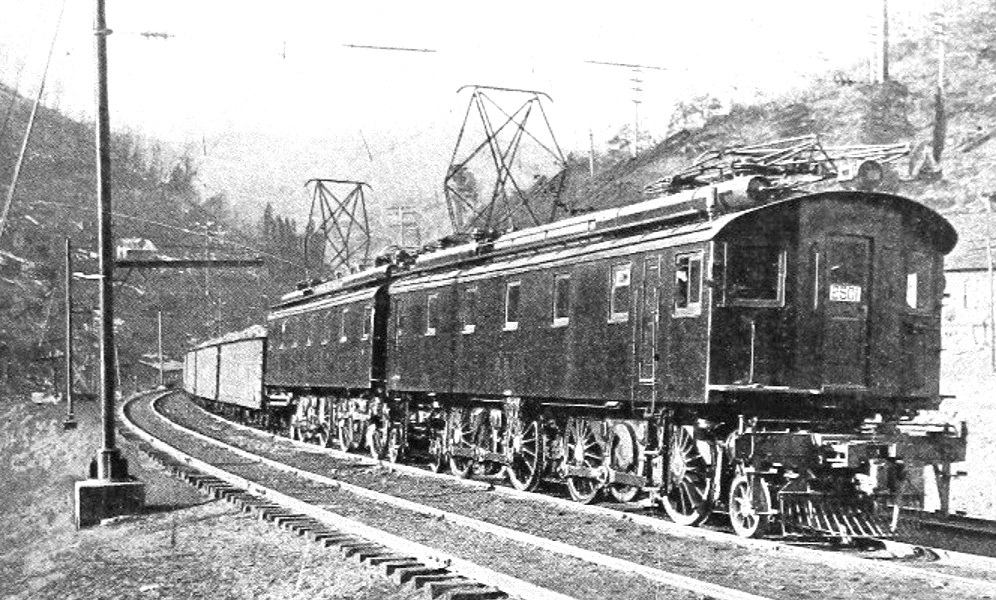
- N&W LC-1 No. 2501 on the Elkhorn grade in 1915

Overview
- Owner: Norfolk and Western Railway
- Locale: Virginia, West Virginia

Service
- Depot(s): Bluestone, West Virginia
- Rolling stock: N&W LC-1, N&W LC-2

Technical
- Line length: 52 mi (84 km)
- Track gauge: 4 ft 8 1/2 in (1,435 mm) standard gauge
- Electrification: 11 kV 25 Hz AC

The Elkhorn Grade Electrification was a project undertaken by Westinghouse in 1913–1915 to electrify a 27-mile (43 km) section of the Norfolk and Western Railway's Bluefield Division in Virginia and West Virginia. Electrification was extended in the 1920s, reaching 52 miles (84 km) before the N&W abandoned it in 1950 when a new Elkhorn tunnel was built with an easier grade and a double track mainline.

== Background ==
In the early twentieth century the Bluefield Division of the Norfolk and Western Railway featured a forbidding two percent average grade. Multiple 2-6-6-2 Class Z1 "Mallet" steam locomotives labored hauling 3,000-short-ton (2,700 t) coal trains up and down the grade. Although most of the route was double track, it narrowed to a single track at the Elkhorn Tunnel, which was 3,100 feet (940 m) long and itself on a 2 1/2% grade. Steam-powered trains were limited to 6 miles per hour (9.7 km/h) in the tunnel, and delays were common.

== History ==
Working with Westinghouse, the Norfolk and Western electrified a 27-mile (43 km) segment between Bluefield, Virginia and Vivian, West Virginia. The N&W constructed a power plant at Bluestone, West Virginia, along with maintenance shops for the electric locomotives. Substations were located at Bluefield, Vivian, Maybeury, and North Fork. The electrification system was 11 kV at 25 Hz. Aside from the Elkhorn Tunnel the entire system was double or triple track. Including sidings, yard trackage, and branches to coal mines, 90 miles (140 km) were under catenary.

The effect of the electric operation was immediate and measurable. In June 1914 the electrified district handled 272 trains averaging 2,896 short tons (2,627 t) of coal. Each train required three Class Z1 locomotives. In June 1915, with electric operation only partially implemented, this rose to 397 trains averaging 3,054 short tons (2,771 t), a 60 percent increase. In normal operation two LC-1 boxcabs could handle each train.

Pleased with the results, in 1915–1916 the N&W electrified another 6 miles (9.7 km), from Bluestone Junction to Clift Yard and to Pocahontas. After World War I several more extensions followed on the west end, raising the mileage to 52 miles (84 km).

- Vivian–Iaeger
- Welch–Wilcoe

After World War II the N&W decided to abandon electrification on the Bluefield Division. The railroad constructed a 5-mile (8.0 km) $11.9 million double-track bypass of the Elkhorn Tunnel. The reduced grade eliminated the need for electric traction. The bypass was dedicated on June 26, 1950.

== Rolling stock ==
To operate under the wires the N&W ordered twelve twin-unit LC-1 boxcab locomotives from Baldwin-Westinghouse. Each twin unit weighed 270–300 short tons (240–270 t) and was 105 feet 8 inches (32.21 m) long, making it both the largest and heaviest electric locomotive in the United States at the time of its introduction. The N&W supplemented these in 1925 with four LC-2 locomotives. The N&W scrapped all sixteen when electrification ended in 1950.

== See also ==
- Railroad electrification in the United States
