= Jandel =

Jandel may refer to:

== People ==
- Janzen Madsen, known as Jandel, developer of Grow a Garden video game
- Jandel Gustave (born 1992), Dominican baseball pitcher
- Alexandre Vincent Jandel (1810–1872), French Dominican
- Babu Jandel (fl. from 2018), Indian politician
- Ragnar Jändel (1895–1939), Swedish poet and writer

== Other uses ==
- Jandel Scientific Software, developer of software including SigmaStat
- Jandel, a fictional locomotive in Tom Swift and His Electric Locomotive

== See also ==
- Jandelsbrunn, a municipality in Bavaria, Germany
