= BBÖ 1170.2 =

Austrian electric locomotive

BBÖ 1170.2 / ÖBB 1245
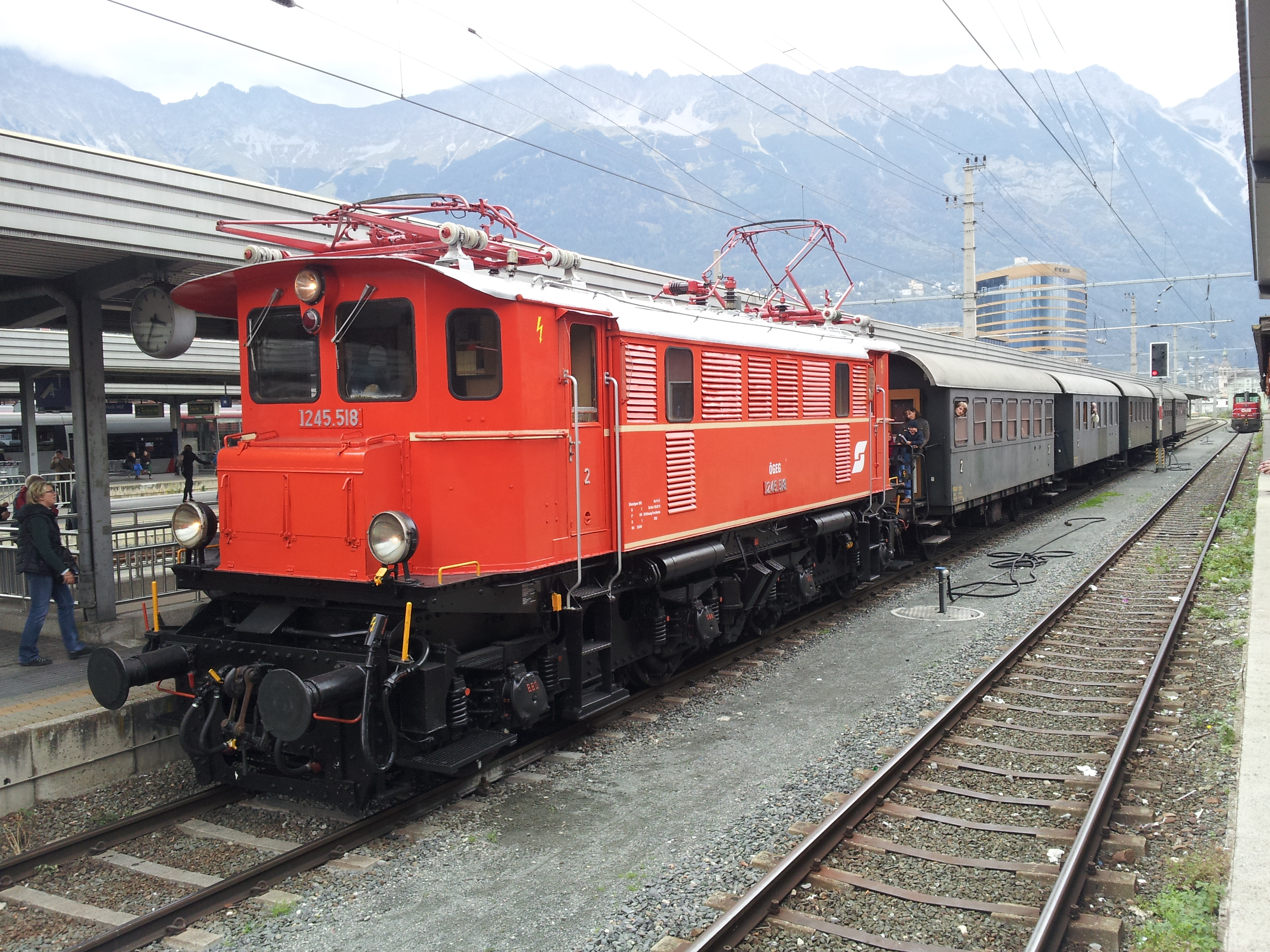
- ÖBB 1245.518 in Innsbruck
Type and origin
- Builder: ABES (AEG, Brown Boveri, ELIN, Siemens-Schuckert), Floridsdorf
- Build date: 1934–1939
- Total produced: BBÖ: 33 (ordered); DR: 41; ÖBB: 38
Specifications
- Configuration
  - UIC: Bo'Bo'
- Gauge: 1435 mm
- Driver dia.: 1350 mm
- Wheelbase
  - Overall: 9040 mm
- Length
  - Over beams: 12920 mm
- Axle load: 20.8 t
- Adhesive weight: 83 t
- Service weight: 83 t
- Electric system/s: 15 kV / 16 2/3 Hz
- Current pickup: Pantograph
- Engine type: 1~Rs
- Traction motors: 4
- Transmission: Sécheron quill drive
- Loco brake: Electrical brake with braking resistors on the roof (not all engines, see text below)
- Train brakes: Vacuum brake, later air brake
Performance figures
- Maximum speed: 80 km/h
- Power output
  - 1 hour: 1840 kW at 56 km/h
  - Continuous: 1700 kW at 58 km/h
- Tractive effort
  - Starting: 200 kN
Career
- Numbers: BBÖ 1170.201–233; DRB E 45.201–241; ÖBB 1245.01–08, 1245.509–515, 529–541, 1245.619–628 (later 1245.519–528), (with gaps)
- Retired: by 1995

The BBÖ class 1170.2 (later DRB class E 45.2, then ÖBB class 1245) was an electric locomotive of the Austrian Federal Railways.

== History ==
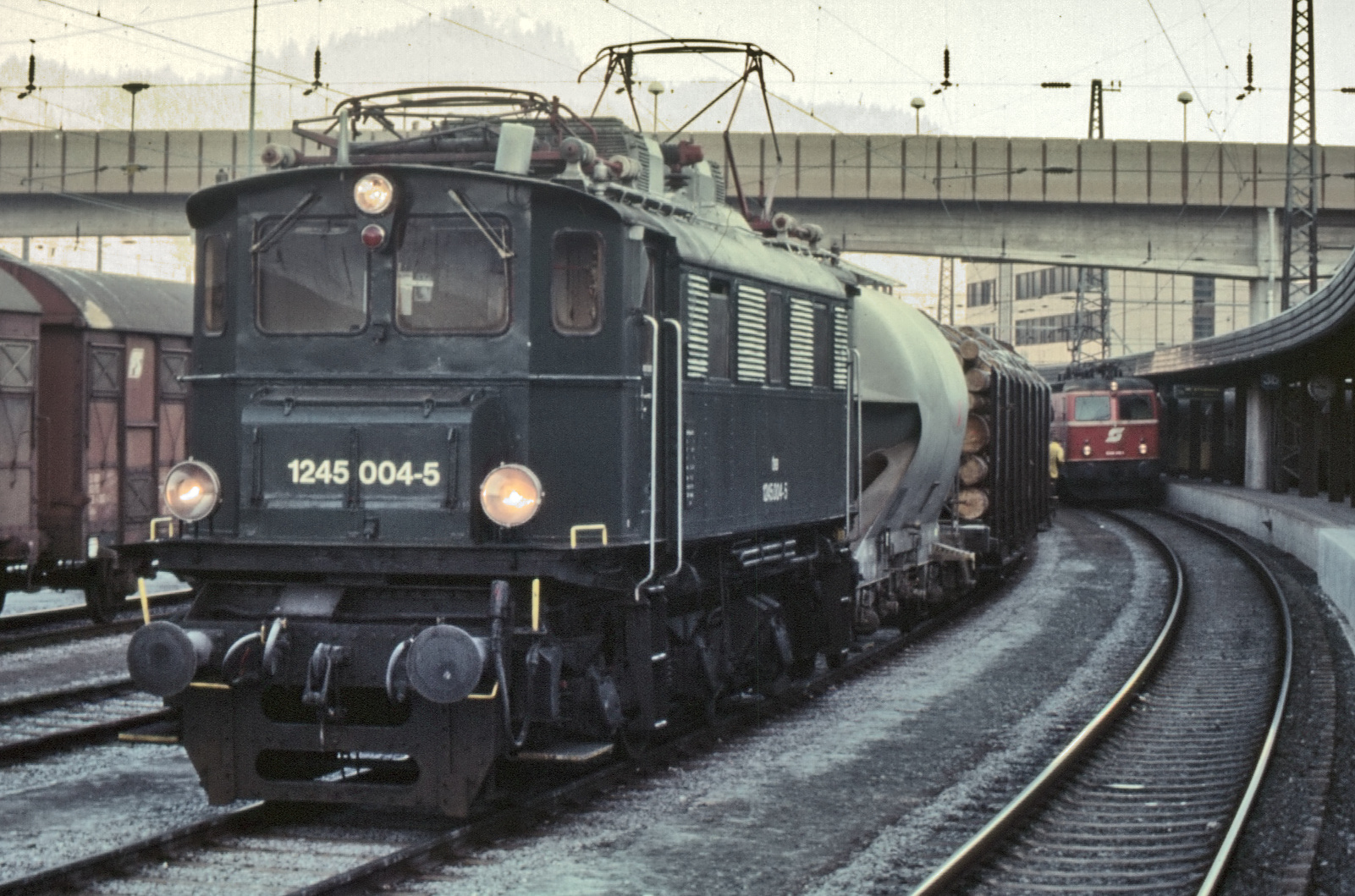
1245 004 with a freight train in Kufstein (1990)

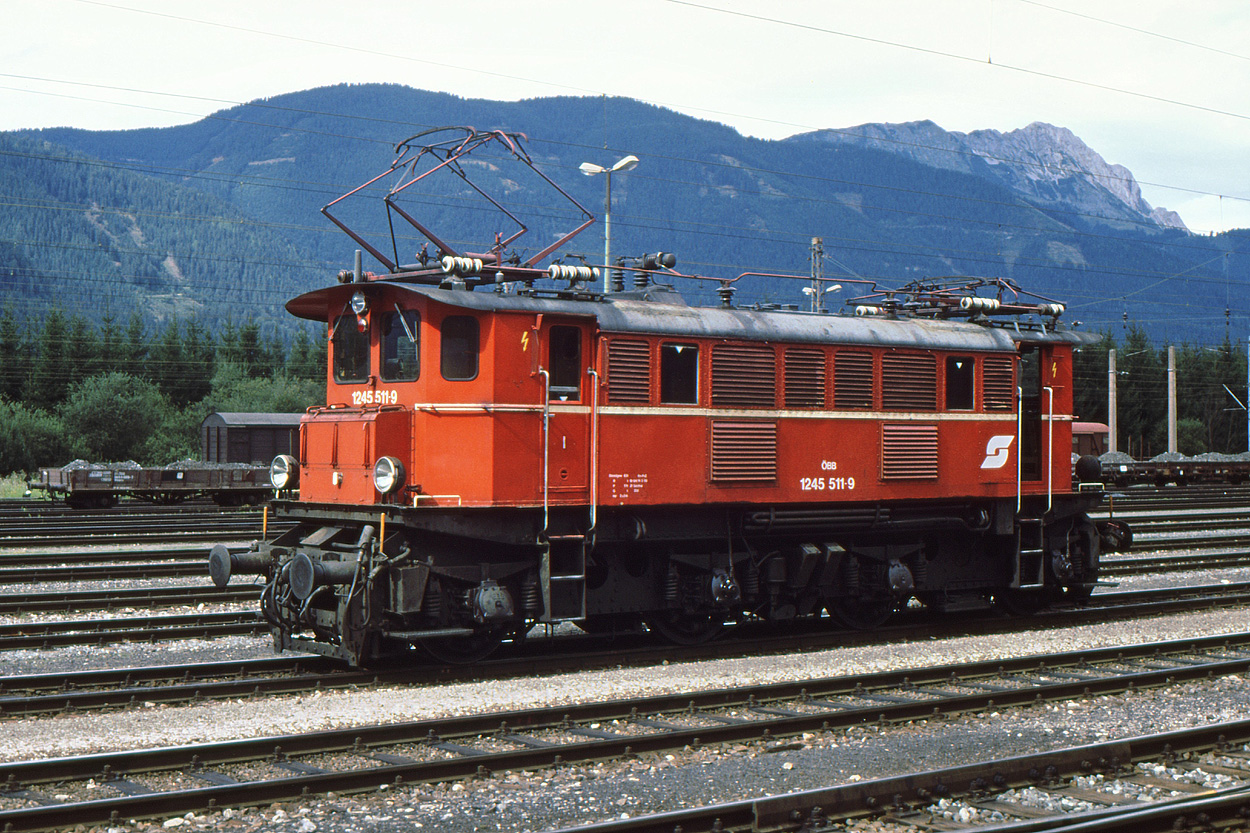
1245 511-9 in Selzthal station (1994)

In light of the planned advancing electrification of the Western Railway from Salzburg towards Vienna, in the early 1930s there was a need for general purpose engines for a hilly route. These were required to be both suitable for light passenger services at 80 km/h and able to pull 800 ton freight trains up a 10‰ gradient at 47 km/h. Due to the changed requirements compared to the classes 1170 und 1170.1, the electrical part had to be completely redesigned, while the Bo'Bo' wheel arrangement as well as the Sécheron quill drive were to remain the same. The electrical part was jointly taken over by all major electrical companies represented in Austria, AEG, Brown Boveri, ELIN, and Siemens-Schuckert. These had formed the ABES consortium and from then on took turns leading the development of new Austrian locomotive classes. The only remaining Austrian locomotive manufacturer, Lokomotivfabrik Floridsdorf, supplied the mechanical part, which was a further development of the class 1170.1.

Initially, eight locomotives of this class were delivered between 1934 and 1936. Then, 1170.209–233 were delivered between 1938 and 1939 with some of them directly to the Deutsche Reichsbahn, which renumbered these vehicles as class E 45.2 and ordered eight more of them with a total of 41 locomotives of this class built.

The first batch of engines differed from the later ones in terms of roof shape and roof equipment. Their carbodies were also designed differently, featuring end gangway connections to the train and diagonally arranged cab doors opening to the front. During later modifications, these differences were eliminated and the external appearance of the locomotives was harmonized across the class members.

Locomotives 1170.219–228 were not fitted with electric breaks, while numbers 229 to 233 had multiple-unit controls intended for use on the Tauern Railway.

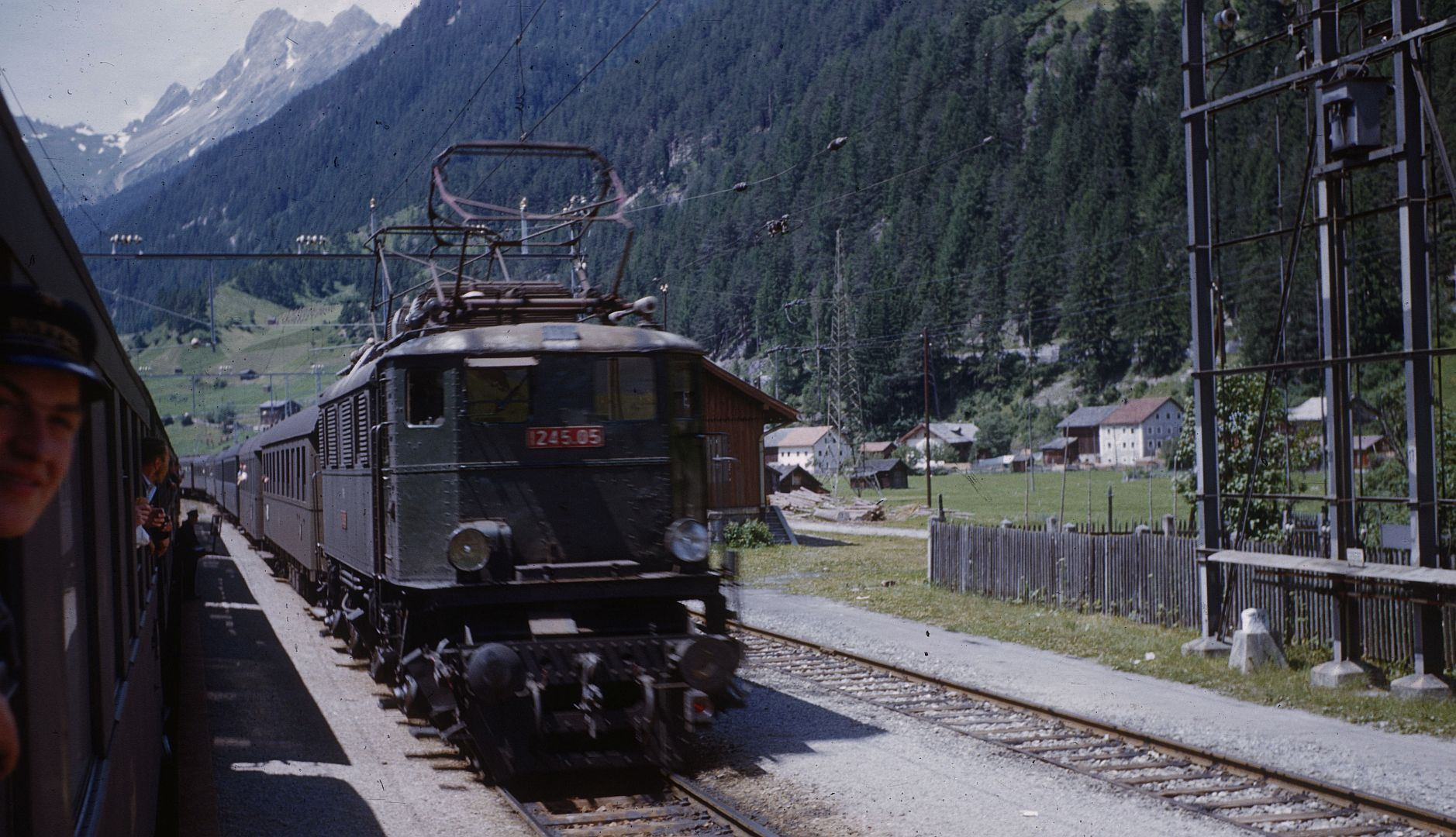
ÖBB 1245.05 in Pettneu in circa 1954

As the electrification of the Western Railway only began in 1937 due to lack of funds, the locomotives were initially stationed in Bludenz, Innsbruck and Salzburg. Their primary area of operation was the Tauern Railway.

From 1941 onwards, however, they were finally also used on the Western Railway between Salzburg and Attnang-Puchheim. The German Reichsbahn stationed seven engines in Augsburg, from where they returned without damage back to Austria after 1945. However, 1170.206, 215, and 226 had to be written off as war losses.

From 1953 onwards, the remaining engines at ÖBB formed the class 1245, with those of the first series being designated as 1245.01-08, the remainder of those with electric brakes as 1245.509 and those without electric brakes as 1245.619-628. Between 1967 and 1971, all 1245.6s were fitted with an electric brake and re-numbered to be included in the class 1245.5

The class 1170.2 (1245) has proven to be highly successful from the start. Together with the class 1020, it formed the backbone of electric train operations in Austria in the first years after World War II. The locomotives were taken out of service by 1995.

=== Design ===
The mechanical part was further developed from the class 1170.1 and included two solidly built bogies, which had to absorb the compressive and tractive forces, as well as the locomotive body mounted on top of these. The main frame corresponded to that the predecessor type, and also the Sécheron quill drive was used again. In the 1980s and 1990s, the spiral springs on some locomotives were replaced with rubber buffers, analogue to the successor class 1040 some years earlier. However, some retained their original spiral springs, and some even had both types of drive installed when they were taken out of service.

The electrical part was a completely new design. The force-ventilated and oil-cooled transformer had a maximum output of 1900 kVA and was fitted with notch taps for the driving gear as well as two taps each for the train heating and auxiliary systems. The four force-ventilated 460 kW, ten-pole series-wound motors were controlled by an electro-pneumatic C contactor control system with 17 notches. The electrical brake was equivalent to that of the class 1170.2. and was removed from most of the locomotives around 1990.

After World War II, all locomotives were painted in fir green with a black frame and aluminium grey roof. Later, fir green was replaced by blood orange on all engines except for 1245.004, 005, 520, 521 and 523. 1245.527 was finally painted traffic red with an umbra grey roof and frame towards the end of its service life.

== Preservation ==
Several examples of the class 1245 have been purchased by private clubs and are preserved by volunteers. The list below includes all surviving examples as of 2025.

Number	Current owner	Location	Remarks
011 01 (ex 1245 001)	Austrovapor	Strasshof Railway Museum.	011 01-6 (ex 1245 001-1) in Strasshof (05.09.2007) Not restored, converted to preheating locomotive
1245 002	Austrian Society for Railway History (ÖGEG)	Lokpark Ampflwang	Spare parts donor
1245.04	ÖEM (state railway vehicle collection of the republic of Austria), under administration of ÖBB	Strasshof Railway Museum.	ÖBB 1245.04 in the Strasshof Railway Museum (20.04.2014) Cosmetically restored (was operational until 2008)
1245.05	Heritage Railways in Carinthia (Nostalgiebahnen in Kärnten)	St. Veit /Glan	ÖBB 1245.05 in Gmunden Operational (as of 2025)
1245.514	Tauern Railway Museum	Schwarzach.	ÖBB 1245.514 in the Tauern Railway museum in Schwarzach Cosmetically restored
1245.516	Austrian Society for Railway History	Lokpark Ampflwang	Cosmetically restored
1245.518	Austrian Society for Railway History	Lokpark Ampflwang	
1245.522	Friends of the Railway Lienz (Eisenbahnfreunde Lienz)	Museum Südbahn Heizhaus Lienz	Cosmetically restored
1245.525	Knittelfeld Railway Museum	Knittelfeld	
1245.530		Knittelfeld	One cab in Knittelfeld Railway museum, rest scrapped in 2008

== Models ==
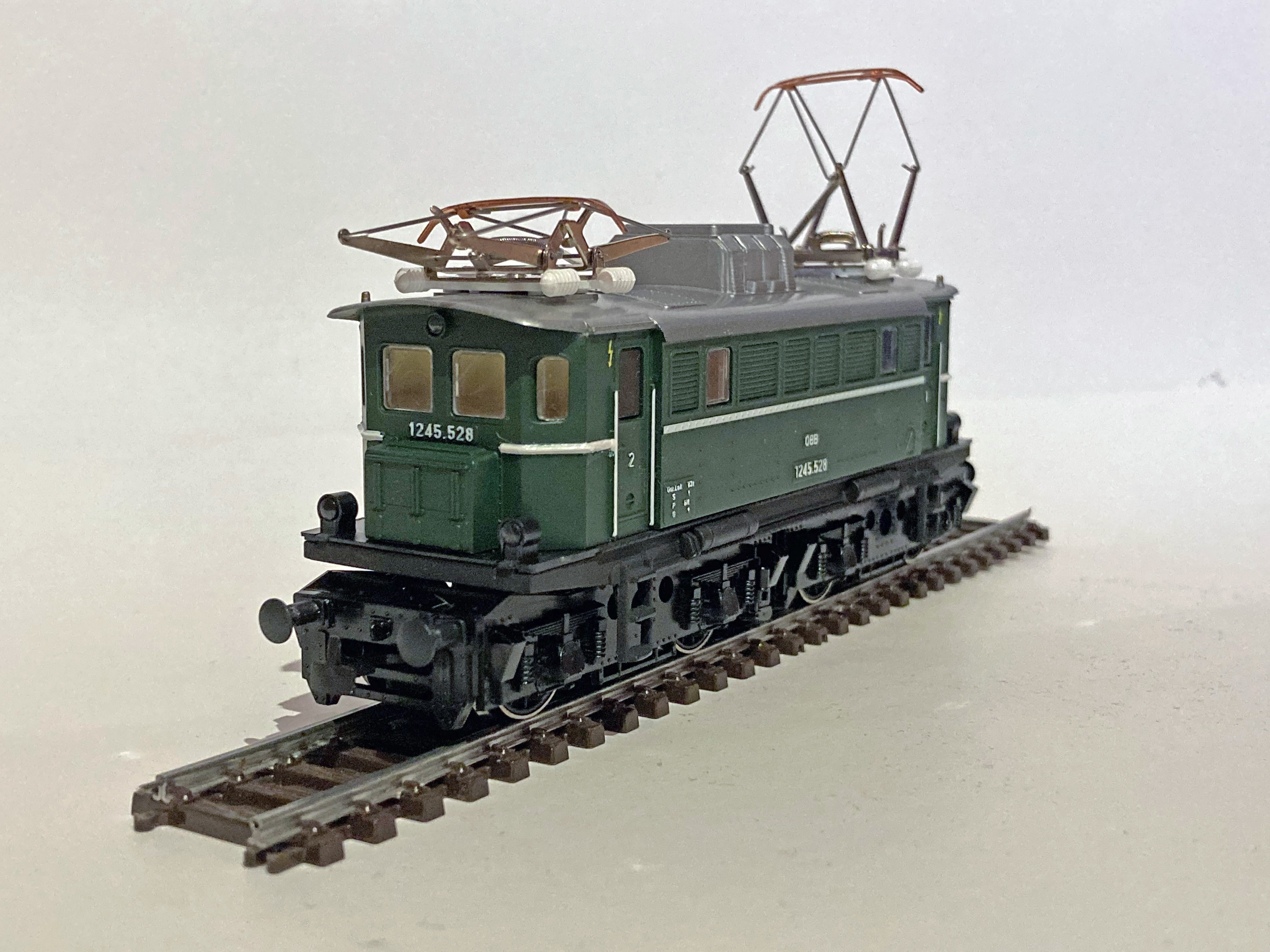
Kleinbahn 1245 in Green

The Viennese model train company Kleinbahn had a (simplified) green model of the class 1245 in its sortiment. In contrast to the original, only two axles were driven, due to space restrictions. It was introduced in 1970 and was offered until the company was liquidated. Later, the model train manufacturers Lima and Roco also produced models of the class 1245 in H0 scale.
