= Norfolk and Western LC-2 Class =

N&W LC-2
Type and origin
- Power type: Electric
- Builder: ALCO/Westinghouse
- Build date: 1924–1925
- Total produced: 4
Specifications
- Configuration
  - AAR: (1-D-1)+(1-D-1)
- Gauge: 4 ft 8 1/2 in (1,435 mm)
- Loco weight: 414 short tons (376 t)
- Electric system/s: 11 kV 25 Hz AC
- Current pickup(s): Pantograph
Performance figures
- Power output: 4,750 horsepower (3,540 kW)
Career
- Scrapped: 1950
- Disposition: All scrapped

The N&W LC-2 was a class of boxcab electric locomotives built by Westinghouse and the American Locomotive Company (ALCO) for the Norfolk and Western Railway. ALCO and Westinghouse built four locomotives in 1924–1925 for use on the Elkhorn Grade. They were retired and scrapped in 1950 when the N&W discontinued electric operations.

== Design ==
The LC-2 was an improved version of the N&W LC-1, which Westinghouse, with Baldwin, had built for the N&W in 1914–1915. The locomotives were a third more powerful than their predecessors.

== History ==
After World War I the N&W extended electrification on the Elkhorn Grade to a total of 52 miles (84 km) and required additional electric power to handle demand. Westinghouse and ALCO delivered four LC-2s in 1924–1925, which the N&W operated alongside the older LC-1s. Following World War II the N&W bypassed the existing Elkhorn Tunnel with a new tunnel twice as long as the original, double-tracked, and on a gentler 1.4% grade. These improvements eliminated the need for electrification. On the opening of the new tunnel on June 26, 1950 the N&W retired the LC-2s.
