= Tom Swift and His Electric Locomotive =

1922 novel by Victor Appleton

- Tom Swift and his electric locomotive
- Author: Victor Appleton
- Original title: Tom Swift and His Electric Locomotive, or, Two Miles a Minute on the Rails
- Language: English
- Series: Tom Swift
- Genre: Young adult novel Adventure novel
- Publisher: Grosset & Dunlap
- Publication date: 1922
- Publication place: United States
- Media type: Print (Hardback & Paperback)
- Pages: 200+ pp
- ISBN: 978-1515123040
- Preceded by: Tom Swift Among the Fire Fighters
- Followed by: Tom Swift and His Flying Boat

Tom Swift and His Electric Locomotive, Or, Two Miles a Minute on the Rails, is Volume 25 in the original Tom Swift novel series published by Grosset & Dunlap.

== Plot summary ==
Richard Bartholomew, president of the Hendrickton and Pas Alos Railroad Company (H&PA) is under pressure to save his company from bankruptcy. If Mr. Bartholomew cannot come up with a means to compete with the Hendrickton & Western railroad, the H&PA will be doomed to failure. Mr. Bartholomew has contracted The Swift Construction Company to build a new electric locomotive which can travel at 2 miles per minute (120 miles per hour (190 km/h) ).

The catch is that the owner of the competing H&W railway, Montagne Lewis, is dishonest and will stop at nothing to prevent Mr. Bartholomew from succeeding. Hired thugs are under orders to destroy Tom's developments. Tom, and his friends Ned Newton and Mr. Damon, have several life-threatening encounters with these hired gunmen.

== Inventions & Innovation ==
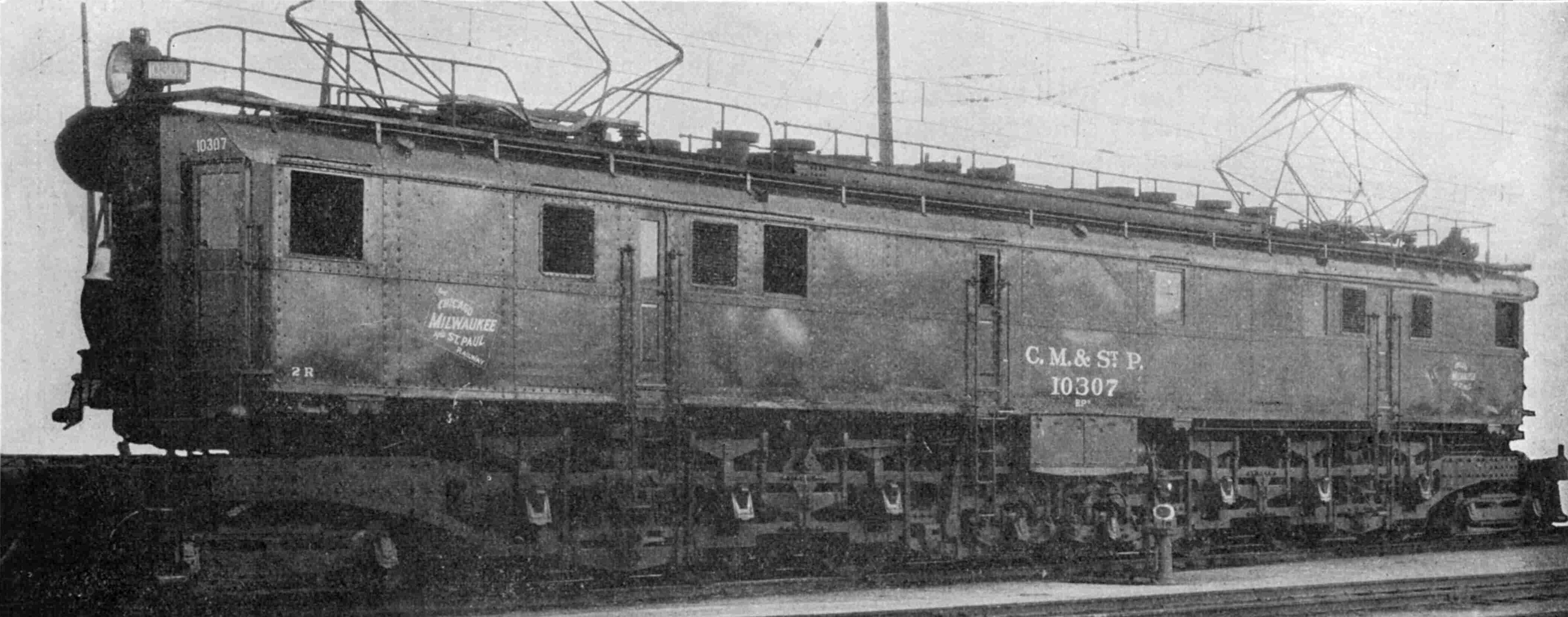
Image of a Milwaukee Road class EP-3, having similar specs to the Hercules 0001

Tom must build a locomotive engine to compete with the best engines of the time, an engine under the patent of Jandel. The result is the Hercules 0001, an electric locomotive measuring 90 feet long, 14 feet tall and weighing almost 275 tons. The engine is powered by a pantograph connection to dual overhead catenary lines providing 3,000 volts DC. The engine is laid out with two non-driven trucks of four wheels on either end, and 12 driving wheels of 70-inch diameter. The layout of the driving wheels is never explicitly mentioned, but the configuration would be either 4-12-4 or 4-6-0+0-6-4 (see Whyte notation). Each axle is independently powered. The output of the engine is estimated at 4400 horsepower. The locomotive in the story was loosely based on the electric locomotives of the Milwaukee Road.

Tom is able to achieve the target specs of 120 mph on straight tracks, for passenger transport; for hauling freight up a 2% incline, he is able to achieve 45 mph.

An ammonia pistol is also used, a black pistol-like weapon which shoots compressed ammonia. It has a bulb on one end.
