= New Haven EP-1 =

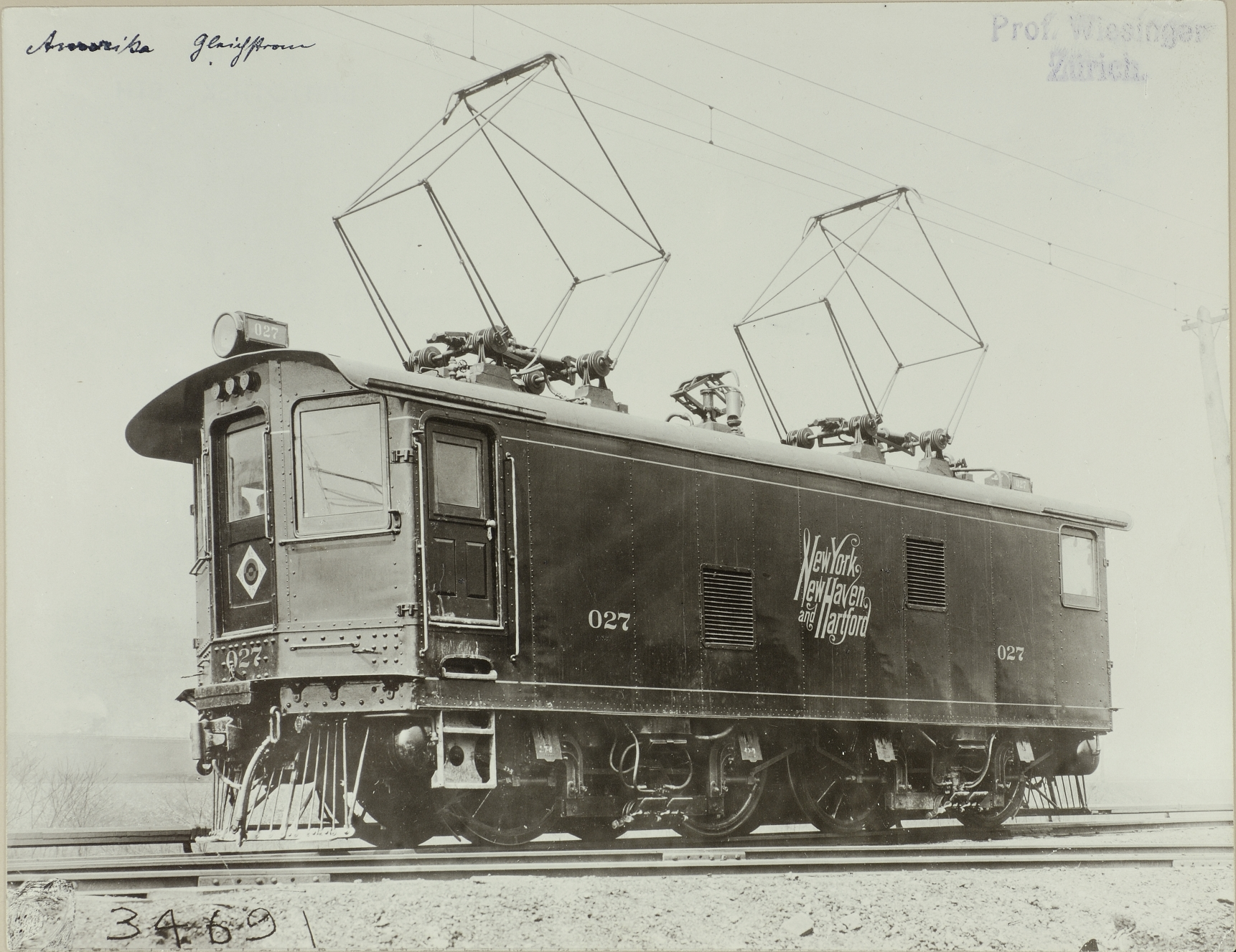
- New Haven EP-1 No. 027, circa 1915. Note the small DC pantograph between the two larger AC pantographs.
Type and origin
- Power type: Electric
- Builder: Baldwin-Westinghouse
- Build date: 1905–1908
- Total produced: 41
Specifications
- Configuration
  - Whyte: 0-4-4-0 as built 2-4-4-2 modified
  - AAR: B-B as built 1-B-B-1 modified
  - UIC: Bo'Bo' as built (1'Bo)(Bo1') modified
  - Commonwealth: Bo-Bo as built 1Bo-Bo1 modified
- Gauge: 4 ft 8 1/2 in (1,435 mm)
- Wheel diameter: 62 inches (1,600 mm)
- Length: 37 feet 6 1/2 inches (11.443 m)
- Loco weight: 102 short tons (93 t)
- Electric system/s: 660 V DC; 11 kV 25 Hz AC
- Current pickup(s): Pantograph; Contact shoe
- Traction motors: 4 × Westinghouse 130
- MU working: Yes
Performance figures
- Maximum speed: 80 miles per hour (130 km/h)
- Power output: 1,420 horsepower (1,060 kW)
Career
- Operators: New Haven
- Class: EP-1
- Numbers: 01–041
- Locale: North America
- Delivered: 1905–1908
- First run: 1905
- Retired: 1947
- Preserved: None
- Disposition: All scrapped

The New Haven EP-1 was a class of boxcab electric locomotives built by Baldwin-Westinghouse for the New York, New Haven and Hartford Railroad. The locomotives were part of an electrification project undertaken by the New Haven between Grand Central Terminal in New York City and Stamford, Connecticut. Baldwin-Westinghouse delivered 41 locomotives between 1905–1908, and the New Haven retired the last in 1947.

== Design ==
The EP-1 had to support two electric systems and three collection methods. The New York Central Railroad's 660 V third rail DC extended from Grand Central to Woodlawn, where New Haven territory began. Westinghouse installed 11 kV overhead line AC from Woodlawn to Stamford. Finally, the New York Central employed overhead lines over railroad switches in place of third rail electrification. To support these myriad methods, Westinghouse installed two sets of pantographs, one for AC and one for DC collection, and a contact shoe for third rail operation. Control devices within the locomotive prevented drawing power from multiple sources and enabled transition between them without stopping.

The boxcab body was 37 feet 6 1/2 inches (11.443 m) long and weighed 102 short tons (93 t). Beneath it, initially, were four axles in a pair of trucks (B-B arrangement). After oscillation problems the New Haven added an unpowered axle to each end (1-B-B-1), which resolved the issue. The EP-1 was capable of multiple working, and was the first electric locomotive to do so regularly.

== History ==
Westinghouse delivered the first prototype in 1905, followed by 34 production units in 1907–1908. One was loaned to the Pennsylvania Railroad in 1907 for testing on the West Jersey and Seashore Railroad; the locomotive tested well but the Pennsylvania adopted DC electrification for its New York Tunnel Extension. The New Haven ordered six more in 1908. The EP-1 designation, applied later, stood for "Electric Passenger."

The EP-1s handled passenger trains between New York and Stamford, and later New Haven, Connecticut, when the New Haven extended electrification there. Retirements began in 1936 as equipment wore out and newer locomotives became available, but the last left service in 1947. The New Haven supplemented the EP-1 fleet with 27 EP-2 boxcabs, built between 1919–1927 and 10 EP-3 boxcabs in 1931.

No New Haven EP-1s survive today.

== See also ==
- Multi-system (rail)
