= New Haven EP-2 =

Class of boxcab electric locomotives

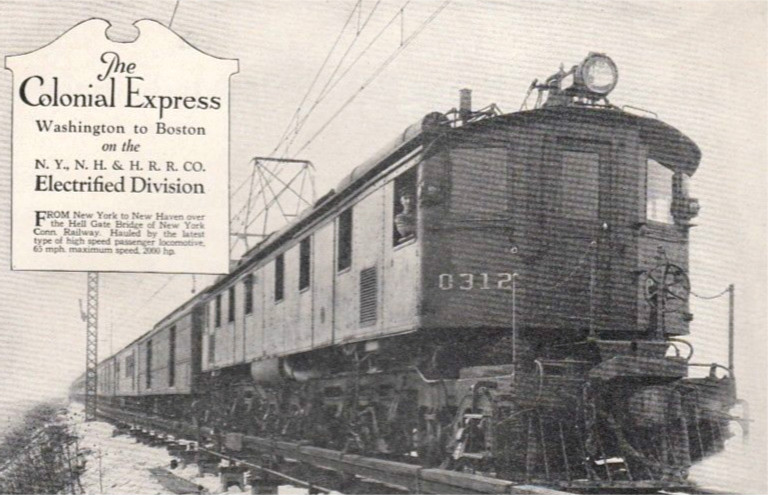
- New Haven EP-2 No. 0312 pulling the Colonial Express over the Hell Gate Bridge Route in 1927
Type and origin
- Power type: Electric
- Builder: Baldwin-Westinghouse
- Build date: 1919–1927
- Total produced: 27
Specifications
- Configuration
  - Whyte: 2-6-2+2-6-2OE
  - AAR: 1-C-1+1-C-1
  - UIC: (1′Co1′)+(1′Co1′)
- Gauge: 4 ft 8 1/2 in (1,435 mm)
- Length: 69 feet (21 m)
- Loco weight: 175 short tons (159 t)
- Electric system/s: 660 V DC third rail; 11 kV 25 Hz AC overhead catenary
- Current pickups: Pantograph; Contact shoe
- Traction motors: 6 × Westinghouse 409-C2 AC
Performance figures
- Maximum speed: 66 miles per hour (106 km/h)
- Power output: 2,000 horsepower (1,500 kW)
Career
- Operators: New Haven
- Class: EP-2
- Retired: 1958
- Disposition: All scrapped

The New Haven EP-2 was a class of boxcab electric locomotives built by Baldwin-Westinghouse for the New York, New Haven and Hartford Railroad. The locomotives worked passenger trains on the New Haven's electrified division west of New Haven, Connecticut. Baldwin-Westinghouse delivered 27 locomotives between 1919–1927. The locomotives were an enlarged version of the EP-1 and EF-1 designs. They remained in service until the arrival of the dual-mode EMD FL9 locomotives in 1958.

== Design ==
The New Haven's electrified district extended west from New Haven, Connecticut, to The Bronx, the northernmost borough of New York City. It electrified its lines using 11 kV overhead AC. From Woodlawn to Grand Central Terminal trains ran over the New York Central Railroad's 660 V third rail DC. At Port Morris trains continued over the New York Connecting Railroad to Harold Interlocking in Queens, just short of Pennsylvania Station. This route was jointly electrified by the New Haven and the Pennsylvania Railroad at 11 kV overhead AC.

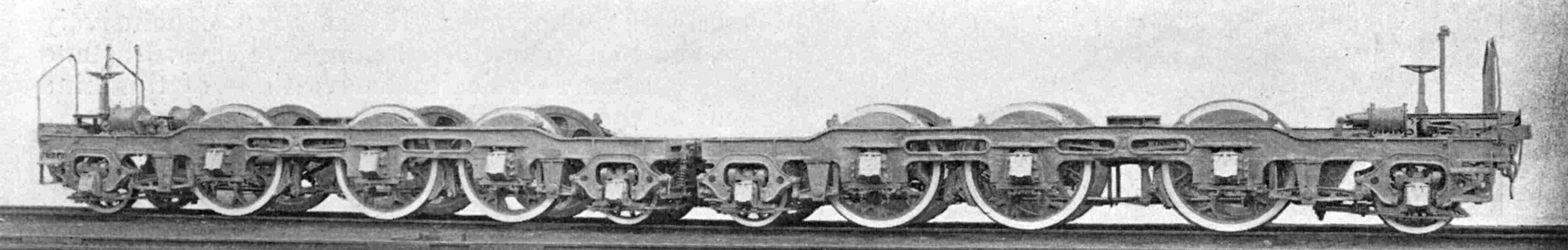
Frames and running gear

To support the multiple electric systems and collection methods between New Haven and New York the EP-2 carried both pantographs and a contact shoe for third rail operation. Six twin Westinghouse 409-C2 AC traction motors drove the locomotive on six axles using a quill drive. Two more unpowered axles were located on each truck, for an unusual 1-C-1+1-C-1 wheel arrangement. Power output was rated at 2,000 horsepower (1,500 kW); the maximum speed was 70 miles per hour (110 km/h). The boxcab body was 69 feet (21 m) long and weighed 175 short tons (159 t).

== History ==
The New Haven needed additional locomotives to handle services into New York City's Pennsylvania Station following the opening of the Hell Gate Bridge Route. After several unsuccessful experimental General Electric locomotives, the New Haven returned to Baldwin-Westinghouse for an improved version of the pioneering EP-1. The first five EP-2 locomotives entered service in 1919. The New Haven ordered twenty-two more between 1923–1927, for a total fleet of twenty-seven locomotives.

The New Haven supplemented the EP-1s and EP-2s with ten EP-3 boxcabs in 1931. The Pennsylvania Railroad replaced the original 600 V third rail DC with 11 kV overhead AC in 1933, allowing New Haven's electric locomotives to operate into Pennsylvania Station and eliminating the engine change in Queens. Retirement of the EP-1s began in 1936. Six EP-4 locomotives joined the roster in 1938.

Even as the New Haven added ten EP-5 locomotives in 1955, change was coming. The company was phasing out electrified freight operations and considered truncating electrification from New Haven to Stamford, Connecticut, a distance of 39 miles (63 km). To that end the company ordered thirty dual-mode EMD FL9 locomotives. These locomotives, capable of either diesel-electric operation or electric operation from third-rail, eliminated the need for an engine change at New Haven. Their arrival in 1958 enabled the retirement of the EP-2 fleet.

All were scrapped.
