= Milwaukee Road class EP-3 =

Class of American electric locomotives

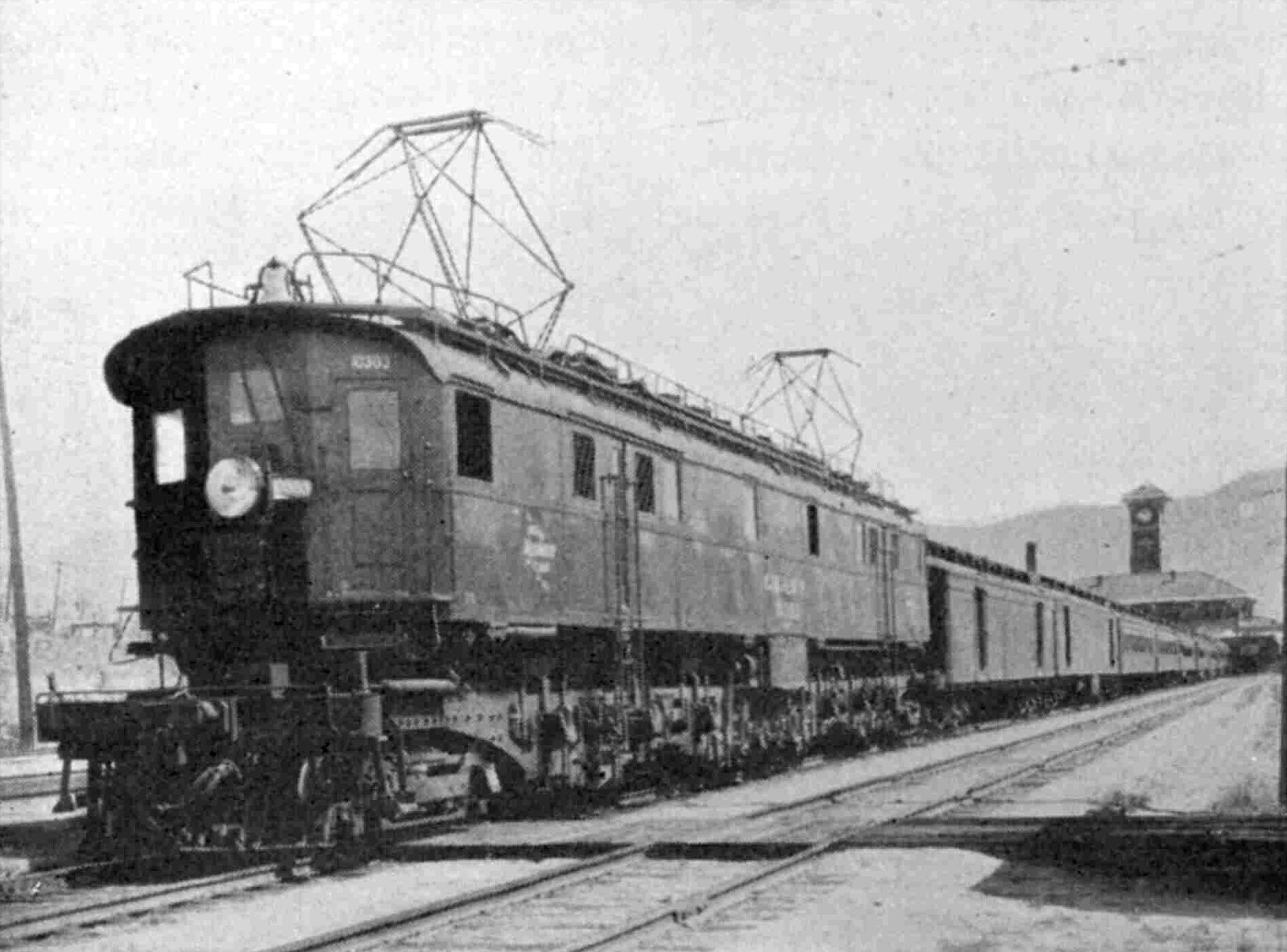
Type and origin
- Power type: Electric
- Builder: Baldwin Locomotive Works / Westinghouse
- Build date: 1919
- Total produced: 10
Specifications
- Configuration
  - Whyte: 4-6-2+2-6-4OE
  - AAR: 2-C-1+1-C-2
  - UIC: (2′Co1′)(1′Co2′)
- Gauge: 4 ft 8 1/2 in (1,435 mm) standard gauge
- Leading dia.: 36 in (914 mm)
- Driver dia.: 68 in (1,727 mm)
- Trailing dia.: 36 in (914 mm)
- Wheelbase: 79 ft 10 in (24.33 m)
- Length: 88 ft 7 in (27.00 m)
- Height: 14 ft 6 in (4.42 m)
- Electric system/s: Overhead line, 3,000 V DC
- Current pickup: Two roof-mounted pantographs
- Transmission: Gearing and quill drive
- Train heating: Steam generator
Performance figures
- Maximum speed: 65 mph (105 km/h)
- Power output: Continuous: 3,396 hp (2,532 kW); One hour: 4,680 hp (3,490 kW)
- Tractive effort: 105,000 lbf (467 kN)
Career
- Operators: Milwaukee Road
- Numbers: 10300–10309; renumbered E10–E19 in 1939
- First run: 1919
- Disposition: All scrapped by 1957

The Milwaukee Road's class EP-3 comprised ten electric locomotives built in 1919 by Baldwin and Westinghouse. They were nicknamed Quills because of their use of a quill drive. Although they were good haulers and well liked by engineers, poor design and constant mechanical problems plagued them for their entire lives and they were among the first of the Milwaukee Road's electric locomotives to be retired.

== Design ==
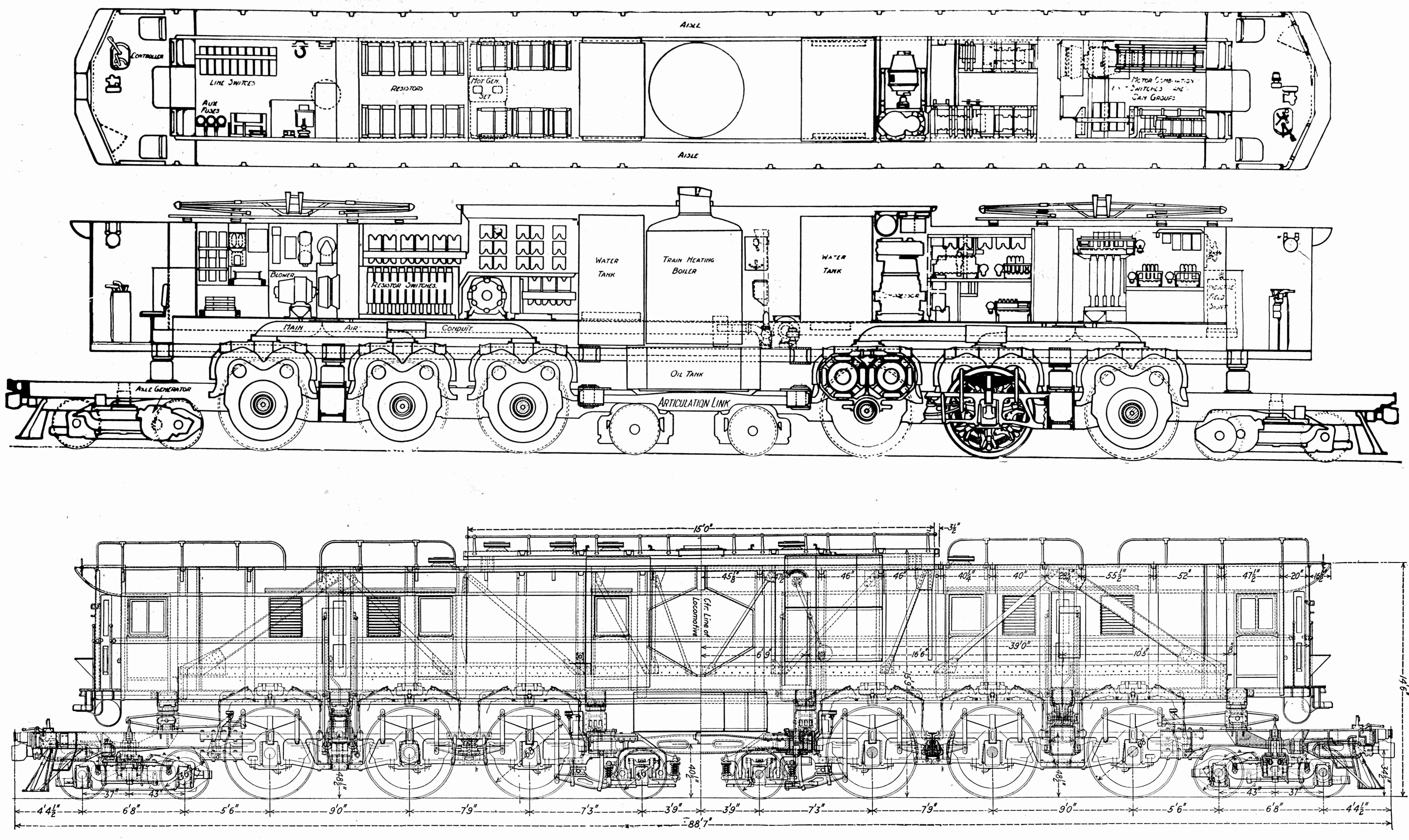
General arrangement drawing.

When the Milwaukee Road decided to electrify the Coast Division in 1917, it attempted to re-equip with equipment bought from General Electric. The United States Railroad Administration, however, dictated that the order for electrical equipment be split between GE and Westinghouse. This meant that of the 15 electric locomotives needed, five (the EP-2s, or bi-polars) came from GE and 10 - the EP-3s - came from Westinghouse.

The EP-3s, while designed to meet the same specifications as the bi-polars, were a completely different design from their GE counterparts. Their appearance was sleeker, albeit less distinctive, with a single long boxcab-style carbody containing all of the electric equipment. Their wheel arrangement was the same as a back-to-back pair of 4-6-2 "Pacific" steam engines, complete with high 68 in (1,727 mm) drivers. They were double-ended and designed for high-speed passenger service.

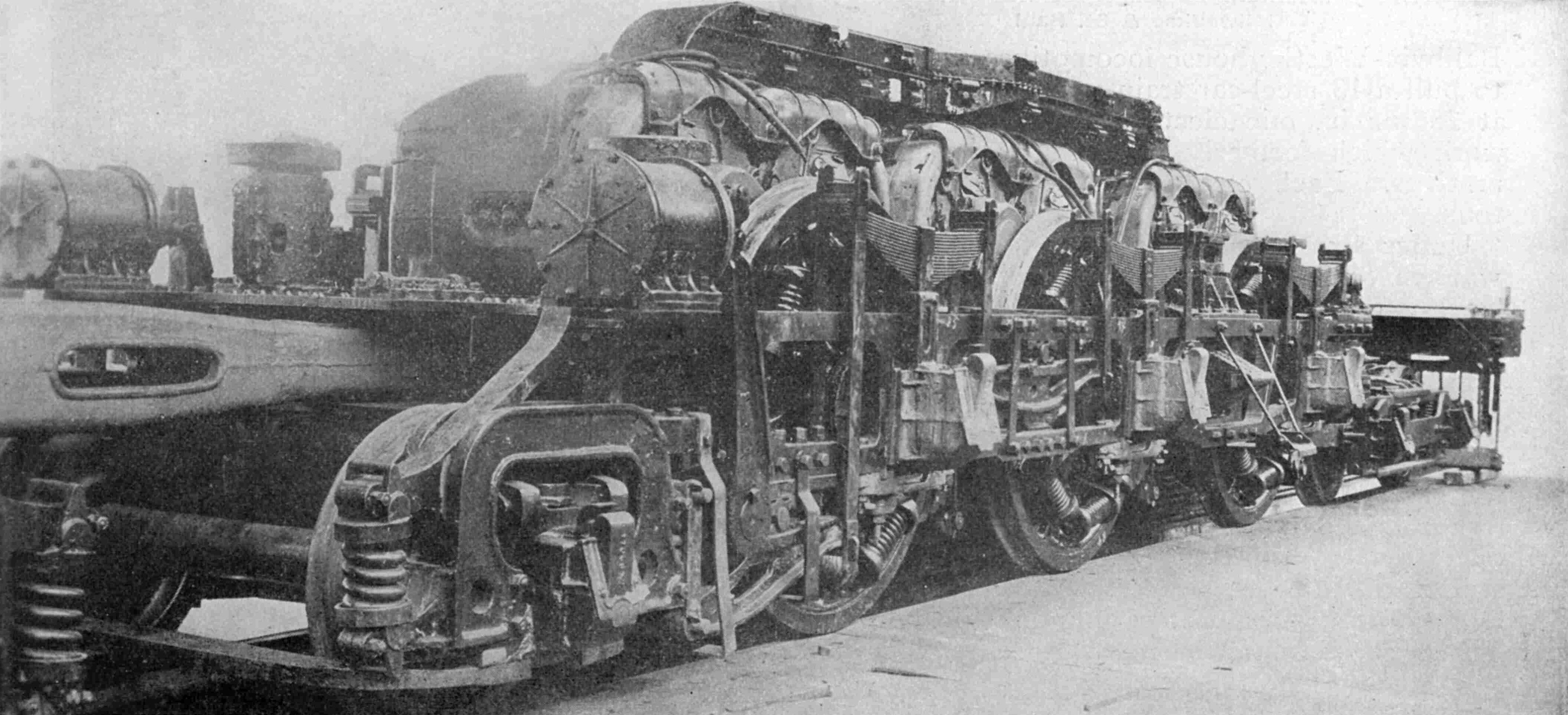
One of the Quill's two frame and motor assemblies

The most noteworthy aspect of their design was the motor mounting system. The locomotive's six 566 hp double traction motors were mounted directly to the frame, one above each driving axle. They were geared to a "quill," a steel tube 15 inches in diameter that was mounted around the axle. At each end of the quill, seven-armed "spiders" stuck out between the spokes of the driving wheels, and were connected to the drivers by coil springs. This system, which was later used very effectively on the famous GG1 locomotive, minimized weight suspended directly from the axles, as the traction motors were bolted directly to the locomotive frame.

== Design flaws and rebuilding ==
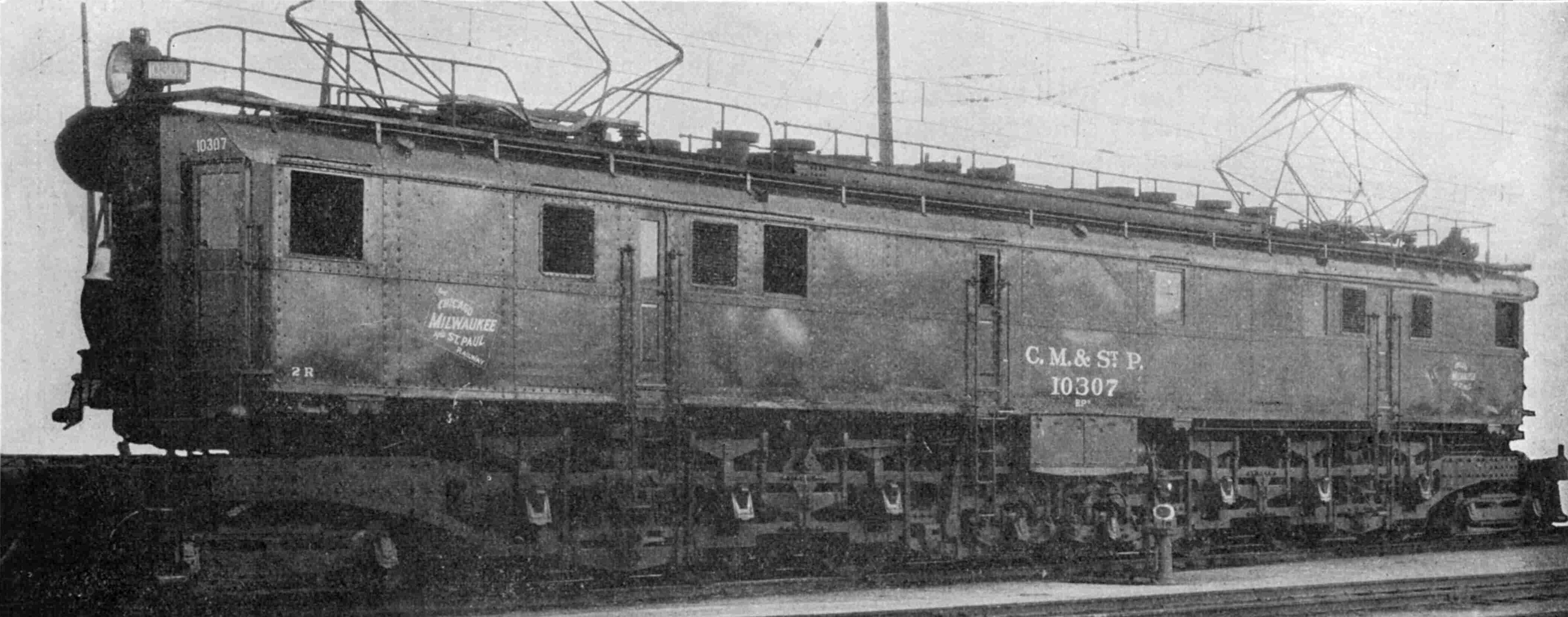
Side view of number 10307.

The "Quills" entered service between late 1919 and early 1921 and were assigned numbers 10300-10309. Assigned mainly to the Mountain Division, they were immediately popular with crews. They could easily pull trains exceeding design specifications at 70-80 mph. They didn't slip like the GE boxcabs and they were much smoother-riding than the bi-polars.

Within a year of entering service, however, severe design flaws began to become apparent. The EP-3s were virtually identical to the New Haven's class EP-2 locomotives, but were heavier in weight and had a much more lightly built frame. The Milwaukee Road's new EP-3s, unlike the trouble-free New Haven boxcabs of similar design, immediately started experiencing broken axles and frame members, cracked wheels and spokes, and deformed suspension springs.

It was an embarrassment for Westinghouse, which had designed the locomotives far too lightly and rigidly. There was too little lateral play in the drivers, causing excessive wheel wear, and the frames were breaking under the stress of high-speed operation through twisting mountain rights-of-way. During 1922 a series of meetings was held to work on design changes for the locomotives.

Baldwin, which had built the locomotives in conjunction with Westinghouse, recommended splitting the body of the locomotive in two, effectively creating a permanently coupled two-unit boxcab. The Milwaukee Road's Electrification Department under Reinier Beeuwkes had come to differing conclusions about the best course of action to take, and resisted Baldwin's recommendation that all ten "Quills" be cut in two. Instead only one, number 10301, was given this modification. The alteration was not found to help the problems, and it was eventually converted back to single-body configuration.

A second "Quill" was modified to the Milwaukee Road's specifications, and with more success. The entire series was effectively converted to single-end operation and were fitted with Commonwealth Delta idler trucks of better design than the originals to help guide the locomotives into curves. The frames were also completely rebuilt with heavier steel.

== In service ==
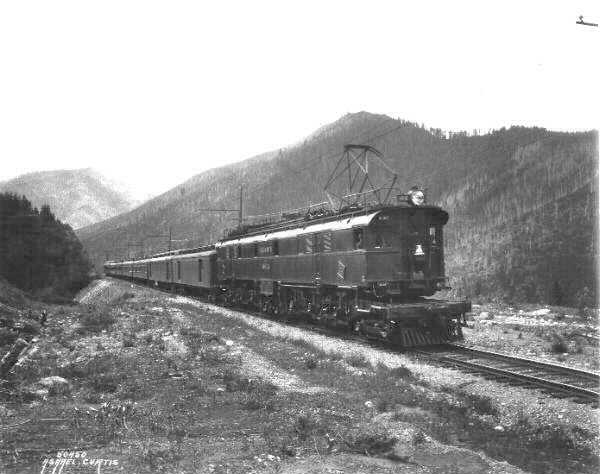
An EP-3 pulling an eastbound train from Seattle.

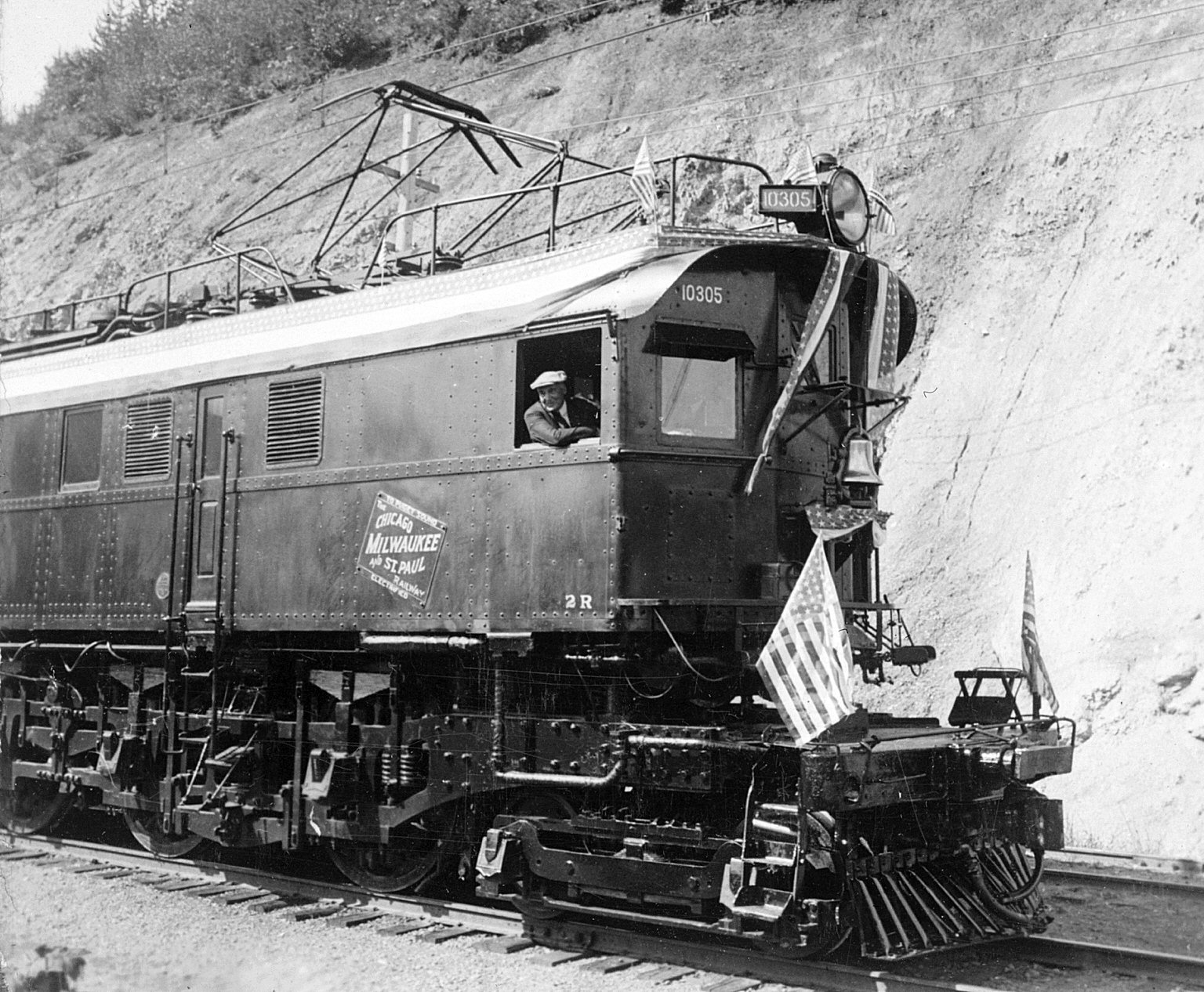
U.S. President Harding in the cab of EP-3 number 10305

The "Quills" never really met the standards set by their GE-designed counterparts. They were constant headaches for the Milwaukee Road mechanical department and were rebuilt five times during their service lives. They were very heavy and the large drivers were suspected of contributing to frame breakage. They were prone to derailing and their weight tended to increase the severity of such derailments. Locomotive E13 (the "Quills" were renumbered E10–E19 in 1939) was destroyed in a derailment at Soudan, Montana in 1947.

In the late 1940s, with the Little Joes entering service and the older electric locomotives worn out from heavy use during World War II, the Electrification Department initiated a program to rebuild the Milwaukee Road's electric locomotives for continued service. The "Quills" were not included in the program. Instead, the seven remaining locomotives (three had already been retired due to wrecks) were gradually retired and scrapped between 1952 and 1957.

== Roster ==
First Number	1939 number	Baldwin serial number	Date built	Disposition
10300	E10	51000	December 1918	Scrapped May 1955
10301	E11	51844	June 1919	Scrapped April 1957
10302	E12	51845	June 1919	Scrapped May 1954
10303	E19 (allocated, but never carried)	52111	August 1919	Wrecked January 1933; not repaired, stored until scrapped September 1942
10304	E13	52170	August 1919	Wrecked, Soudan, Montana, scrapped July 1947
10305	E14	52215	August 1919	Scrapped September 1952
10306	E15	52239	August 1919	Scrapped May 1955
10307	E16	52302	September 1919	Scrapped May 1955
10308	E17	52347	September 1919	Scrapped December 1950
10309	E18	52362	September 1919	Scrapped April 1957
