= Bluestone, West Virginia =

Unincorporated community in West Virginia, United States

- Unincorporated community
- Location within the state of West Virginia Bluestone, West Virginia (the United States)
- Coordinates: 37°18′43″N 81°19′04″W
- Country: United States
- State: West Virginia
- County: Mercer
- Elevation: 2,333 ft (711 m)
- Time zone: UTC-5 (Eastern (EST))
  - Summer (DST): UTC-4 (EDT)
- Area codes: 304 & 681
- GNIS feature ID: 1553941

Bluestone is an unincorporated community in Mercer County, West Virginia, United States. Bluestone is located along the Bluestone River and West Virginia Route 102, 1 mile (1.6 km) south of Bramwell.
