= Ragnar Jändel =

Swedish poet and author

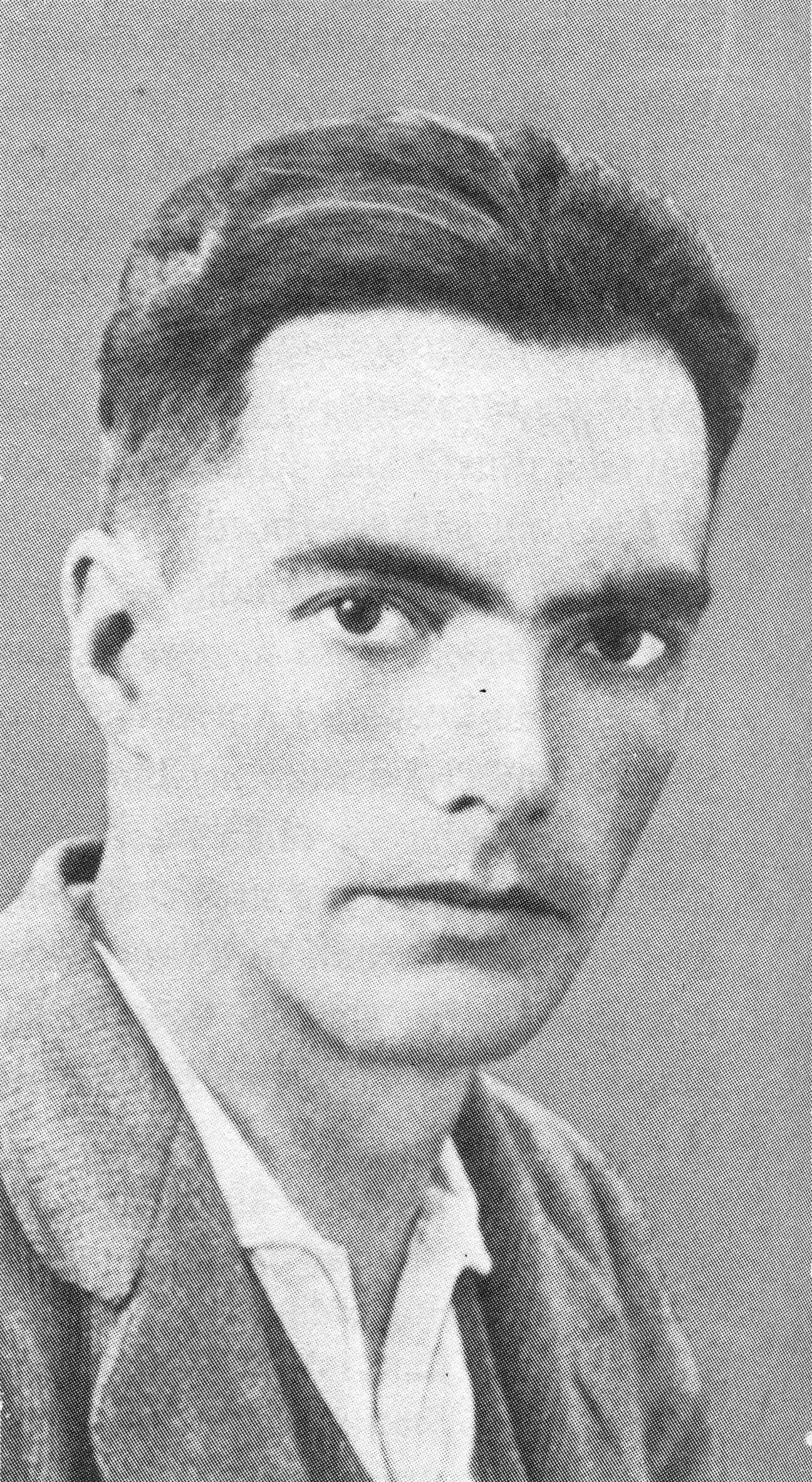
Ragnar Jändel

Ragnar Jändel (13 April 1895 – 6 May 1939) was a Swedish poet and writer. He was of proletarian origin and one of the Swedish labor poets. He was born in Blekinge, and his autobiographical writing Childhood paints a bleak picture of working-class family life. Partly because of a religious tone in his lyrics, he was expelled from the newspapers Brand and Stormklockan by more dogmatic left-wing socialists. One of his poems from this period was proposed by Fabian Månsson for inclusion in the 1937 hymnal. He died in Ronneby.
