= Quill drive =

Mechanism in transmission optimizing

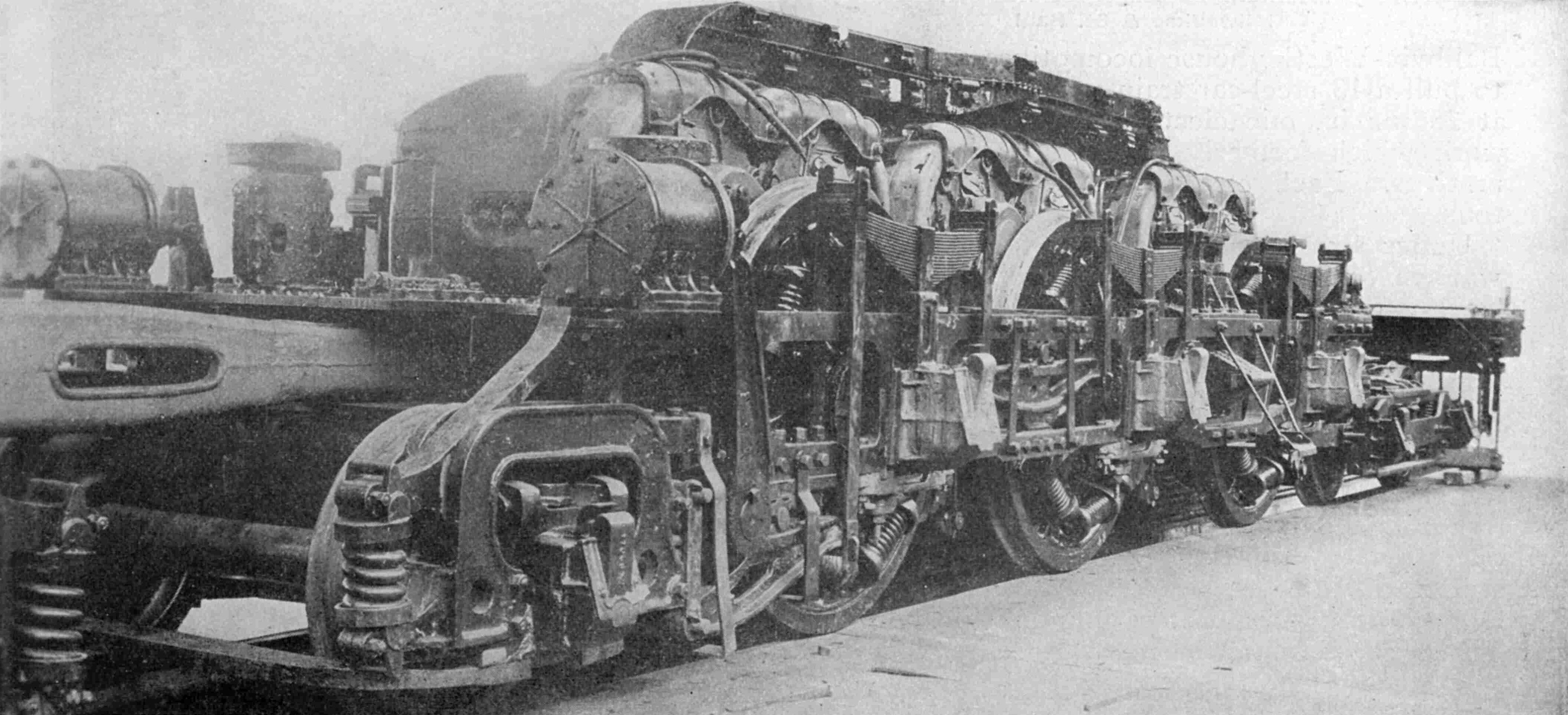
The running gear of a quill drive-equipped EP-3 electric locomotive

A quill drive is a mechanism that allows a drive shaft to shift its position (either axially, radially, or both) relative to its driving shaft. It consists of a hollow driving shaft (the quill) with a driven shaft inside it. The two are connected in some fashion which permits the required motion.

== Examples ==
=== Drill press ===
One example of a quill drive is found in a drill press where the quill allows the chuck to move vertically while being driven rotationally.

=== Railroad locomotive ===
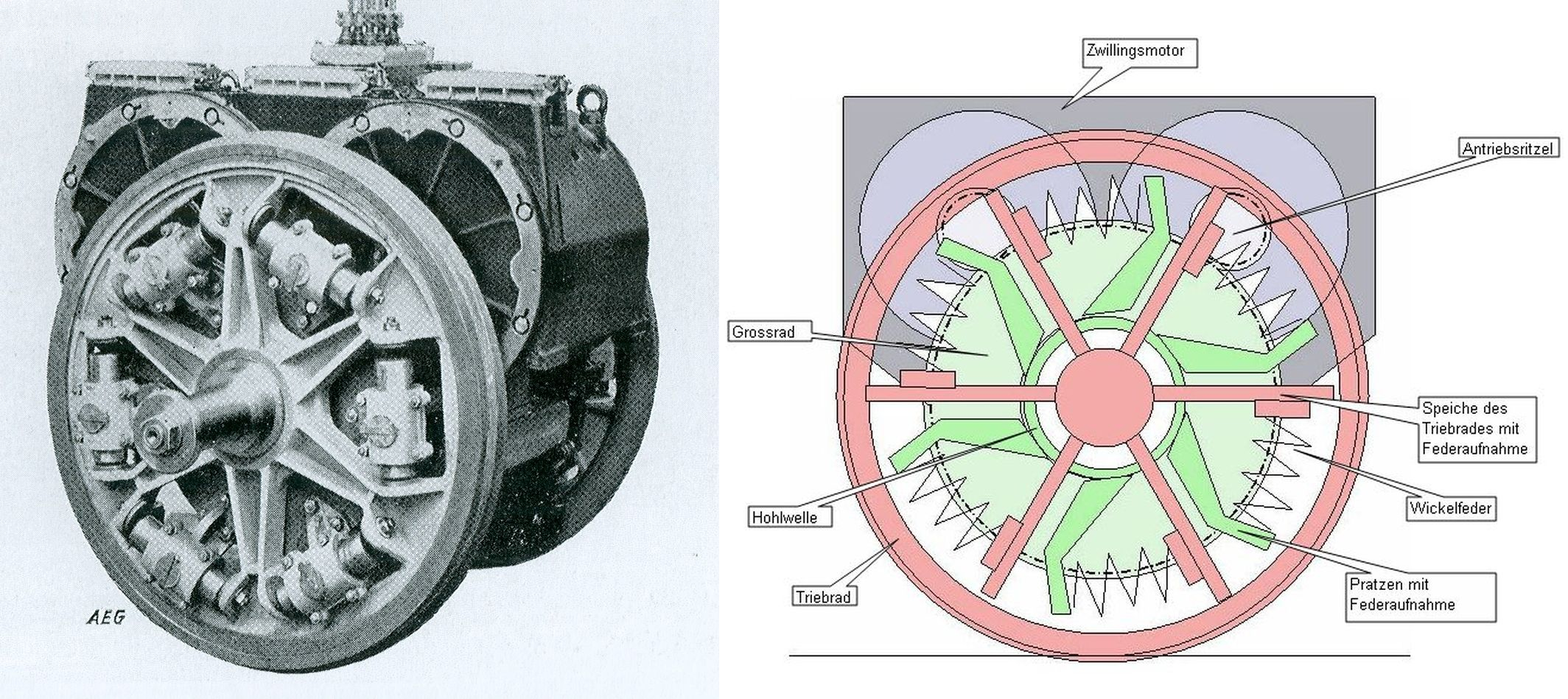
Diagram showing housing and main features of quill drive. Axle of the wheel (pink) passes through hollow quill shaft (green). Spokes on quill shaft are attached to wheel spokes by springs (black). The spring coupling allows limited movement up and down relative to the axle. The motors (gray) drive the quill shaft by a geared rotor (light green). The motors and quill shaft are both fixed to the frame of the locomotive, allowing the locomotive to move upwards and downwards relative to the track upon which the wheels rest, protecting the motors from mechanical shocks from the tracks.

Quill drives have been extensively used in railroad electric locomotives to connect between frame-mounted traction motors and the driven wheels. The two are linked by a flexible drive which allows a degree of radial motion and possibly a small amount of axial motion. This allows the motors to be mounted on top of the suspension system, moving independently of the wheels. This smooths the drive from the motors and isolates them from mechanical shock. This also decreases the unsprung weight borne directly by the wheels, thus decreasing wear on the track.

Quill drives were used by many electric locomotives in the United States, particularly those of the Pennsylvania Railroad—their long-lasting GG1 design being perhaps the best known. Many locomotives built in Switzerland, France, Germany, Italy and Poland used quill drives as well, allowing higher locomotive speed. The English Electric–built NZR ED class used a quill drive, but was found to be hard on the track.

== See also ==
- Buchli drive
- Radial axle
- Tschanz drive
- Winterthur universal drive
