= Norfolk and Western LC-1 Class =

N&W LC-1
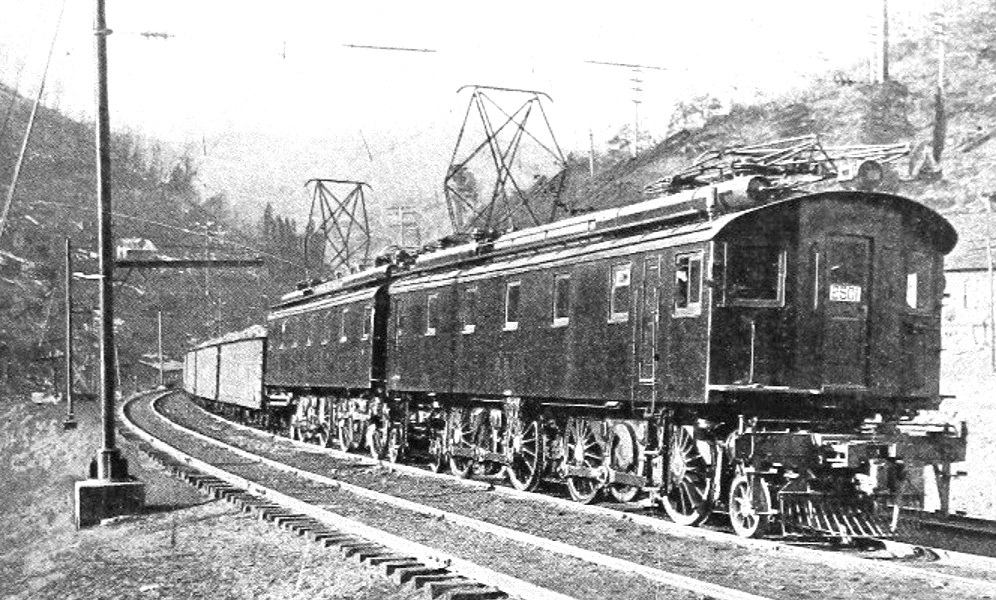
- N&W LC-1 No. 2501 on the Elkhorn grade in 1915
Type and origin
- Power type: Electric
- Builder: Baldwin-Westinghouse
- Build date: 1914–1915
- Total produced: 12
Specifications
- Configuration
  - AAR: (1-B+B-1)+(1-B+B-1)
- Gauge: 4 ft 8 1/2 in (1,435 mm)
- Wheel diameter: 62 inches (1,600 mm)
- Trailing dia.: 30 inches (760 mm)
- Wheelbase: 83 feet 10 inches (25.55 m)
- Length: 105 feet 8 inches (32.21 m)
- Width: 10 feet 9 inches (3.28 m)
- Height: 14 feet 9 inches (4.50 m)
- Adhesive weight: 220 short tons (200 t)
- Loco weight: 270 short tons (240 t)
- Electric system/s: 11 kV 25 Hz AC
- Current pickup: Pantograph
Performance figures
- Maximum speed: 28 miles per hour (45 km/h)
- Power output: 3,200 horsepower (2,400 kW)
- Tractive effort: 133,000 lbs
Career
- Numbers: E1 to E24 renumbered 2500A&B to 2511A&B (not in order)
- Scrapped: 1950
- Disposition: All scrapped

The N&W LC-1 was a class of boxcab electric locomotives built by Baldwin-Westinghouse for the Norfolk and Western Railway. The locomotives were part of an electrification project undertaken by the N&W to improve traffic conditions on the Elkhorn grade in its Bluefield Division. Baldwin-Westinghouse delivered 12 twin-unit boxcabs in 1914–1915. N&W scrapped them in 1950 when it discontinued electric operations.

== Background ==
In the early twentieth century the Bluefield Division of the Norfolk and Western Railway featured a forbidding two percent average grade. Multiple 2-6-6-2 Class Z1 "Mallet" articulated steam locomotives labored hauling 3,000-short-ton (2,700 t) coal trains up and down the grade. Although most of the route was double track, it narrowed to a single track at the Elkhorn Tunnel, which was 3,100 feet (940 m) long and itself on a 2 1/2% grade. Steam-powered trains were limited to 6 miles per hour (9.7 km/h) in the tunnel, and delays were common.

== Design ==
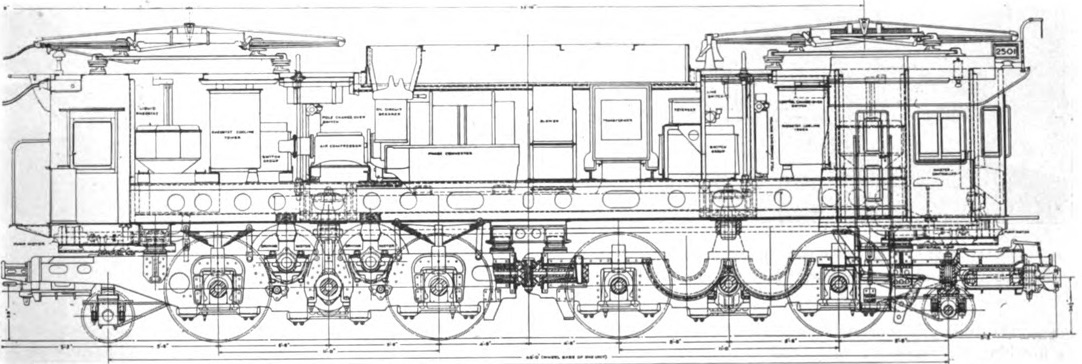
Technical drawing of the LC-1

The LC-1 were of the boxcab type and operated in a semi-permanent twin-unit configuration. The combined locomotive weighed 270–300 short tons (240–270 t) and was 105 feet 8 inches (32.21 m) long, making it both the largest and heaviest electric locomotive in the United States at the time of its introduction.

The LC-1 collected power from overhead lines via pantograph; an on-board transformer stepped the overhead single-phase 11 kV AC down to 750 V. This in turn powered a rotary phase converter, which converted the single phase current to three phase 750 V. The use of three-phase aboard the LC-1 was recommended by Gibbs & Hill, a New York firm who consulted with N&W on the electrification project. According to William D. Middleton, Gibbs & Hill believed that the "ruggedness and simplicity, high output, uniform torque, and adaptability" of three-phase made it a superior choice to single-phase AC or DC for the mountainous Elkhorn area.

== History ==
The effect of the electric operation was immediate and measurable. In June 1914 the electrified district handled 272 trains averaging 2,896 short tons (2,627 t) of coal. Each train required three Class Z1 locomotives. In June 1915, with electric operation only partially implemented, this rose to 397 trains averaging 3,054 short tons (2,771 t), a 60 percent increase. In normal operation two LC-1 boxcabs could handle each train.

After World War II the N&W bypassed the existing Elkhorn Tunnel with a new tunnel twice as long as the original, double-tracked, and on a gentler 1.4% grade. These improvements eliminated the need for electrification. On the opening of the new tunnel on June 26, 1950, the N&W retired the LC-1s. None have been saved.
