= 15 kV AC railway electrification =

Standard current and voltage settings for much of Central Europe's train transport

Railway electrification systems used in Europe: Non-electrified 750 V DC 1.5 kV DC 3 kV DC 15 kV AC 25 kV AC High speed lines in France, Spain, Italy, United Kingdom, the Netherlands, Belgium and Turkey operate under 25 kV, as do high power lines in the former Soviet Union as well.

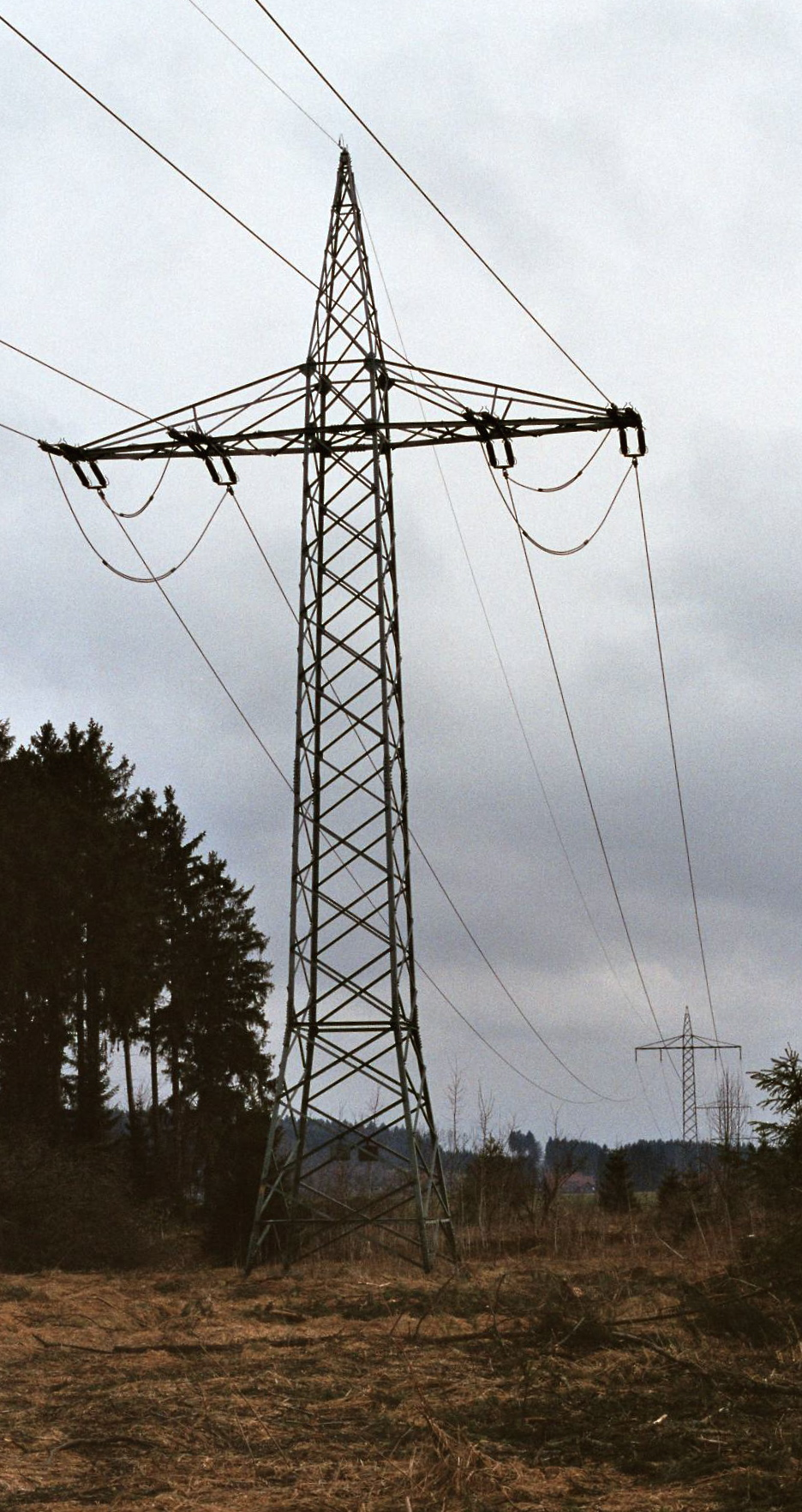
A pylon of a single-phase AC 110 kV power line near Bartholomä in Germany. Lines of this type are used in Germany to supply electric railways with single-phase AC at 16.7 hertz. In the substations of the railway, transformers are used to step it down to 15 kV.

Railway electrification using alternating current (AC) at 15 kilovolts (kV) and 16.7 hertz (Hz) are used on transport railways in Germany, Austria, Switzerland, Sweden, and Norway. The high voltage enables high power transmission with the lower frequency reducing the losses of the traction motors that were available at the beginning of the 20th century. Globally, railway electrification in late 20th century tends to use 25 kV, 50 Hz AC systems which has become the preferred standard for new railway electrifications. Nevertheless, local extensions of the existing 15 kV network is commonplace. In particular, the Gotthard Base Tunnel (opened on 1 June 2016) uses 15 kV, 16.7 Hz electrification.

Due to high conversion costs, it is unlikely that existing 15 kV, 16.7 Hz systems will be converted to 25 kV, 50 Hz despite the fact that this would reduce the weight of the on-board step-down transformers to one third that of the present devices.

== History ==
The first electrified railways used series-wound DC motors, first at 600 V and then 1,500 V. Areas with 3 kV DC catenaries (primarily in Eastern Europe) used two 1,500 V DC motors in series. But even at 3 kV, the current needed to power a heavy train (particularly in rural and mountainous areas) can be excessive. Although increasing the transmission voltage decreases the current and associated resistive losses for a given power, insulation limits make higher voltage traction motors impractical. Transformers on each locomotive are thus required to step high transmission voltages down to practical motor operating voltages. Before the development of suitable ways to efficiently transform DC currents through power electronics, efficient transformers strictly required alternating current (AC); thus high voltage electrified railways adopted AC along with the electric power distribution system (see War of the currents).

The 50 Hz (60 Hz in North America) AC grid was already established at the beginning of the 20th century. Although series-wound motors can in principle run on AC as well as DC (the reason they are also known as universal motors) large series-wound traction motors had problems with such high frequencies. High inductive reactance of the motor windings caused commutator flashover problems and the non-laminated magnetic pole-pieces originally designed for DC exhibited excessive eddy current losses. Using a lower AC frequency alleviated both problems.

In the German-speaking countries, high-voltage electrification began at 16 2/3 Hz, exactly one third of the national power grid frequency of 50 Hz. This facilitated the operation of rotary converters from the grid frequency and allowed dedicated railway power generators to operate at the same shaft speed as a standard 50 Hz generator by reducing the number of pole pairs by a factor of three. For example, a generator turning at 1,000 rpm would be wound with two pole pairs rather than six.

Separate plants supply railway power in Austria, Switzerland and Germany, except for Mecklenburg-Western Pomerania and Saxony-Anhalt; converters powered by the grid supply railway power in those two German states plus Sweden and Norway. Norway also has two hydro-electric power plants dedicated for railway power with 16 2/3 Hz output.

The first generators were synchronous AC generators or synchronous transformers; however, with the introduction of modern double fed induction generators, the control current induced an undesired DC component, leading to pole overheating problems. This was solved by shifting the frequency slightly away from exactly one third of the grid frequency; 16.7 hertz was arbitrarily chosen to remain within the tolerance of existing traction motors. Austria, Switzerland and Southern Germany switched their power plants to 16.7 Hz on 16 October 1995 at 12:00 CET. However, regional electrified sections run by synchronous generators keep their frequency of 16 2/3 Hz – just as Sweden and Norway still run their railway networks at 16 2/3 Hz throughout.

One of the disadvantages of 16.7 Hz locomotives as compared to 50 Hz or 60 Hz locomotives is the heavier transformer required to reduce the overhead line voltage to that used by the motors and their speed control gear. Low frequency transformers need to have heavier magnetic cores and larger windings for the same level of power conversion. (See effect of frequency on the design of transformers.) The heavier transformers also lead to higher axle loads than for those of a higher frequency. Theoretically, in turn, this leads to increased track wear and increases the need for more frequent track maintenance while in practice electric locomotives must not become too lightweight in order to preserve traction effort at low speeds. The Czech Railways encountered the problem of the reduced power handling of lower frequency transformers when they rebuilt some 25 kV AC, 50 Hz locomotives (Class 340) to operate on 15 kV AC, 16.7 Hz lines. As a result of using the same transformer cores (originally designed for 50 Hz) at the lower frequency, the transformers had to be de-rated to one third of their original power handling capability, thereby reducing the available tractive effort by the same amount (to around 1,000 kW).

These drawbacks, plus the need for a separate supply infrastructure and the lack of any technical advantages with modern motors and controllers has limited the use of 16 2/3 Hz and 16.7 Hz beyond the original five countries. Most other countries electrified their railways at the utility frequency of 50/60 Hz. Denmark, despite bordering only 15 kV territory decided to electrify their mainline railways at 25 kV 50 Hz for that and other reasons. Because it is technically very challenging and therefore not cost-effective to provide high-speed passenger services on 1.5 or 3 kV DC lines, newer European electrification primarily in Eastern Europe is mostly 25 kV AC at 50 Hz. Conversion to this voltage/frequency requires higher voltage insulators and greater clearance between lines and bridges and other structures. This is now standard for new overhead lines as well as for modernizing old installations.

Simple European unification with an alignment of voltage/frequency across Europe is not necessarily cost-effective since trans-border traction is more limited by the differing national standards in other areas. To equip an electric locomotive with a transformer for two or more input voltages is cheap compared to the cost of installing multiple train protection systems and to run them through the approval procedure to get access to the railway network in other countries. However, some new high-speed lines to neighbouring countries are already intended to be built to 25 kV (e.g. in Austria to Eastern Europe). Although newer locomotives are always built with asynchronous motor control systems that have no problem with a range of input frequencies including DC, the required additional pantographs and wiring are not universally installed in order to offer cost-reduced models like the Siemens Smartron. Likewise, newer regional passenger trainsets such as the Bombardier Talent 2 series are not certified for additional electrification systems. Despite the Deutsche Bahn train operator does not use any models from the standard electric locomotive series anymore, many smaller private rail companies do, though some are now as much as 60 years old. Even as these obsolescent models are decommissioned, it still may not be easier to unify. Meanwhile, DB Schenker tends to order freight locomotives that are capable of running multiple electrification systems as these operate across Europe.

=== Distribution networks ===
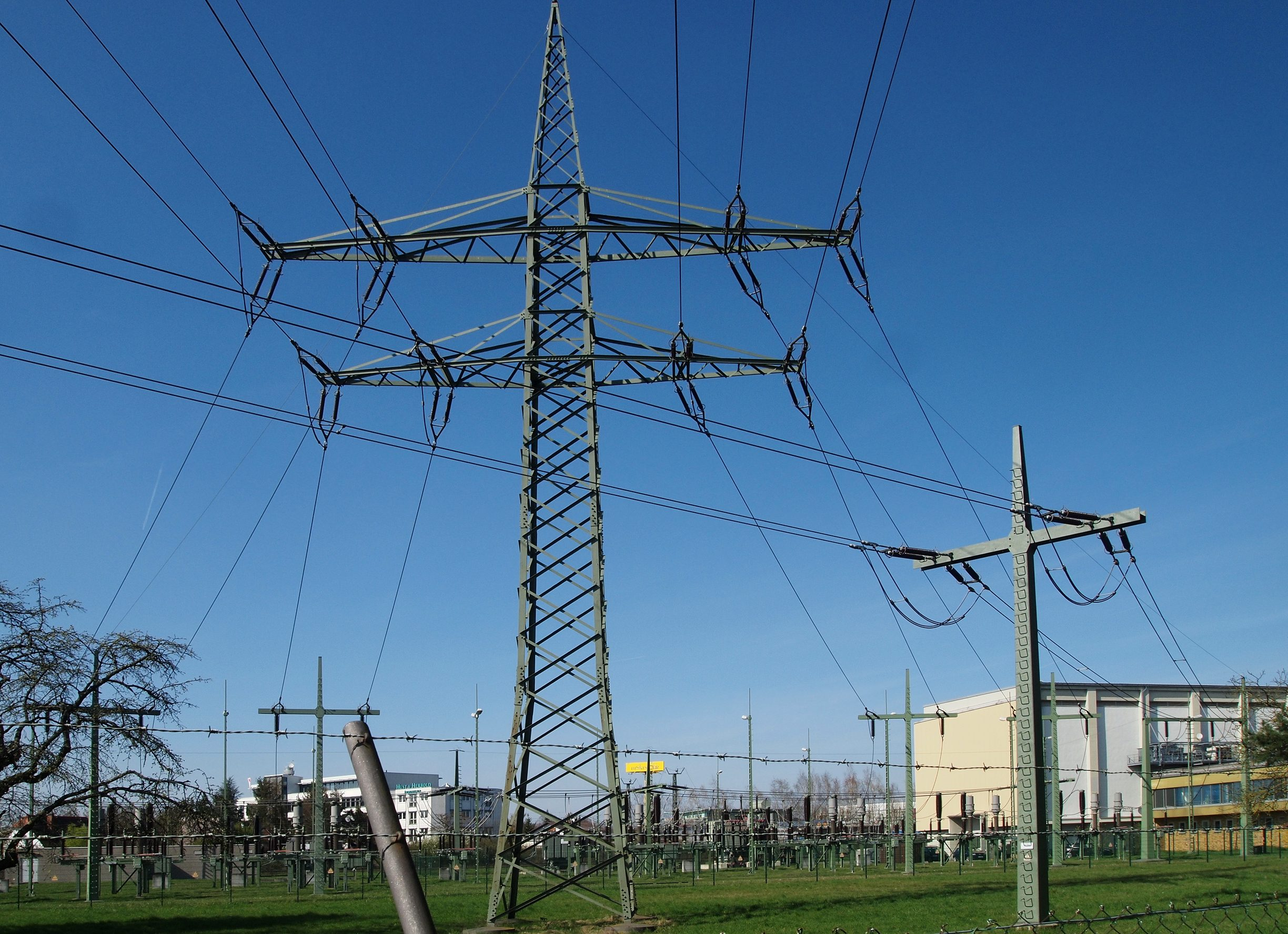
Single-phase (two-wire) lines coming out of a converter plant

In Germany (except Mecklenburg-Western Pomerania and Saxony-Anhalt), Austria and Switzerland, there is a separate single-phase power distribution grid for railway power at 16.7 Hz; the voltage is 110 kV in Germany and Austria and 132 kV in Switzerland. This system is called the centralized railway energy supply. A separate single-phase power distribution grid makes the recuperation of energy during braking extremely easy in comparison with 25 kV 50 Hz system tied to 3 phase distribution grid.

In Sweden, Norway, Mecklenburg-Western Pomerania and Saxony-Anhalt, the power is taken directly from the three-phase grid (110 kV at 50 Hz), converted to low frequency single phase and fed into the overhead line. This system is called the decentralized (i.e. local) railway energy supply.

=== Generation and conversion ===
The centralized system is supplied by special power plants that generate 110 kV (or 132 kV in the Swiss system) AC at 16.7 Hz and by rotary converters or AC/AC converters that are supplied from the national power grid (e.g. 110 kV, 50 Hz), they convert it to 55-0-55 kV (or 66-0-66 kV) AC at 16.7 Hz. The 0 V point is connected to earth through an inductance so that each conductor of the single phase AC power line has a voltage of 55 kV (or 66 kV) with respect to earth potential. This is similar to split-phase electric power systems and results in a balanced line transmission. The inductance through which the earthing is done is designed to limit earth currents in cases of faults on the line. At the transformer substations, the voltage is transformed from 110 kV (or 132 kV) AC to 15 kV AC and the energy is fed into the overhead line.

==== Asynchronous converters ====
The frequency of 16.7 Hz is determined based on the need to prevent synchronism issues in components of the rotary machine. This machine primarily comprises a three-phase asynchronous motor and a single-phase synchronous generator. Synchronism occurs when the frequency reaches 16+2/3 Hz in the single-phase system, according to technical specifications. Therefore, the centralized system's frequency was set at 16.7 Hz to ensure that synchronism is avoided and the machinery operates correctly.

Power plants providing 110 kV, 16.7 Hz, are either dedicated to generating this specific single phase AC or have special generators for the purpose, such as the Neckarwestheim nuclear power plant (decommissioned 2023) or the Walchensee hydroelectric power station.

==== Synchronous converters ====
The power for the decentralized system is taken directly from the national power grid and directly transformed and converted into 15 kV, 16 2/3 Hz by synchronous-synchronous-converters or static converters. Both systems need additional transformers. The converters consist of a three-phase synchronous motor and a single-phase synchronous generator. The decentralized system in the north-east of Germany was established by the Deutsche Reichsbahn in the 1980s, because there was no centralized system available in these areas.

== Facilities for 15 kV AC railway electrification in Germany, Austria and Switzerland ==
Germany, Austria and Switzerland operate the largest interconnected 15 kV AC system with central generation, and central and local converter plants. However, there are islands with alternative electrification systems. For example, the Rübeland Railway is the largest 25 kV AC line in Germany.

== Norway ==
In Norway all electric railways use 15 kV 16 2/3 Hz AC (except the Thamshavnbanen museum railway which uses 6.6 kV 25 Hz AC). The Oslo T-bane and tramways use 750 V DC power.

== Sweden ==
In Sweden most electric railways use 15 kV 16 2/3 Hz AC. Exceptions include: Saltsjöbanan and Roslagsbanan (1.5 kV DC), the Stockholm Metro (650 V and 750 V DC) and tramways (750 V DC). The Oresund Bridge linking Sweden and Denmark is electrified at 25 kV, Danish standard; the split is located on the Swedish side near the bridge. Only two-system trains (or diesel trains; rare) can pass the point.

== See also ==
- List of railway electrification systems
- Category:15 kV AC locomotives
- 25 Hz Power Transmission System
- 25 kV AC railway electrification
- Three-phase AC railway electrification
- Rotary phase converter
- Seebach-Wettingen railway electrification trial
- Traction power network
