= Traction substation =

Electrical substation for railways, trams or trolleybuses

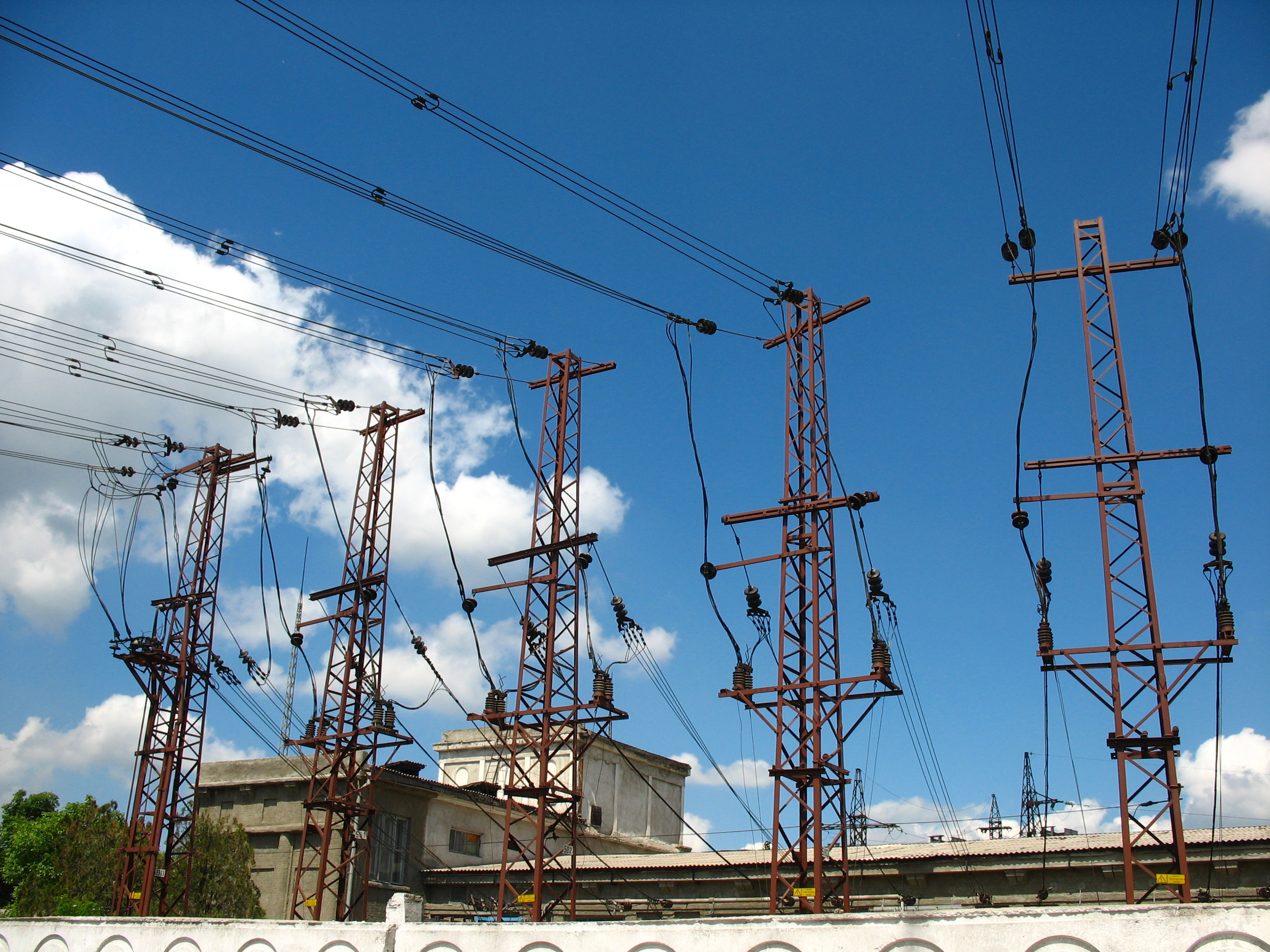
Traction current converter plant

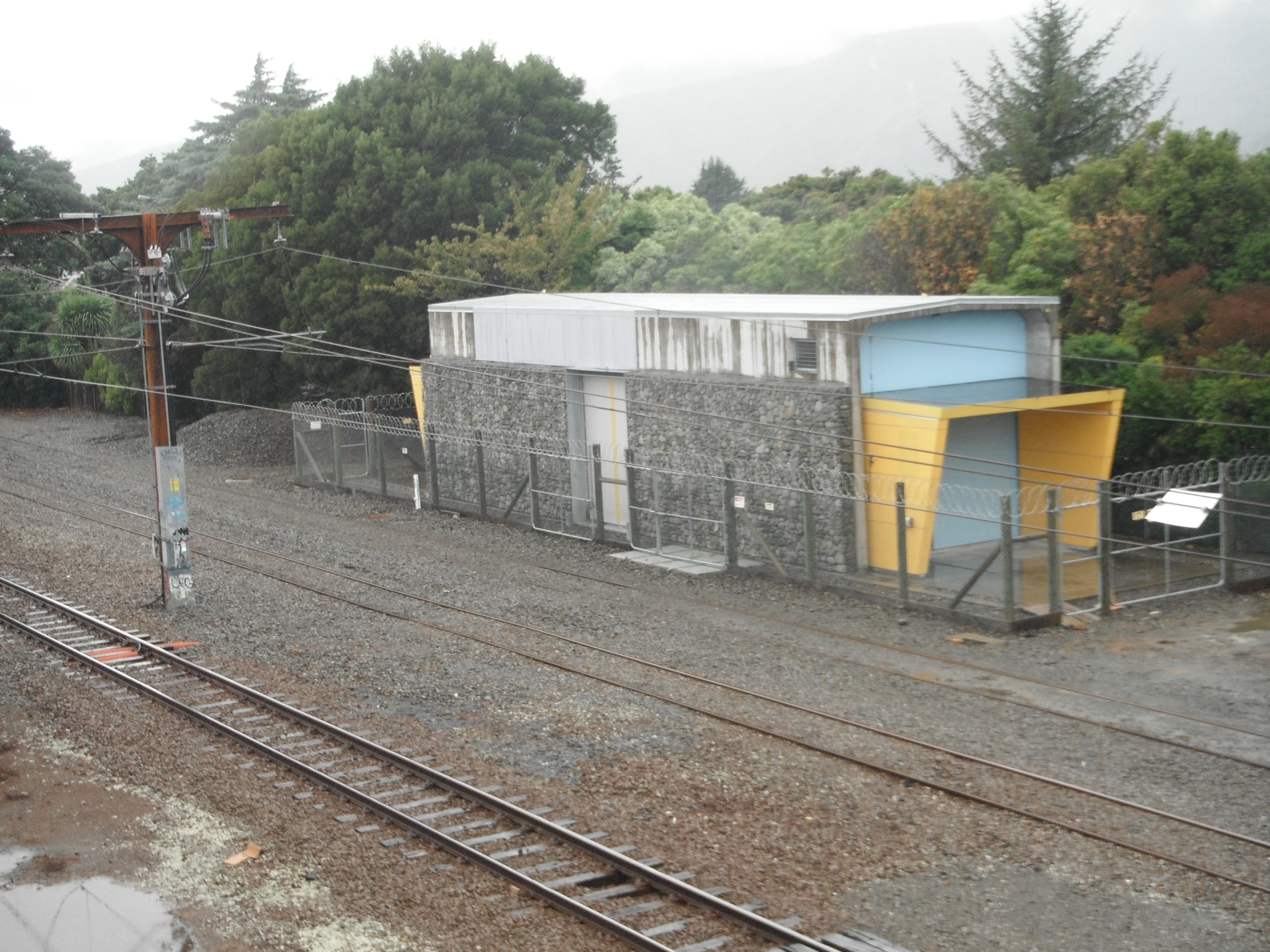
Woburn DC traction substation in Lower Hutt, New Zealand, supplying 1,500 V DC to the electrified Hutt Valley Line.

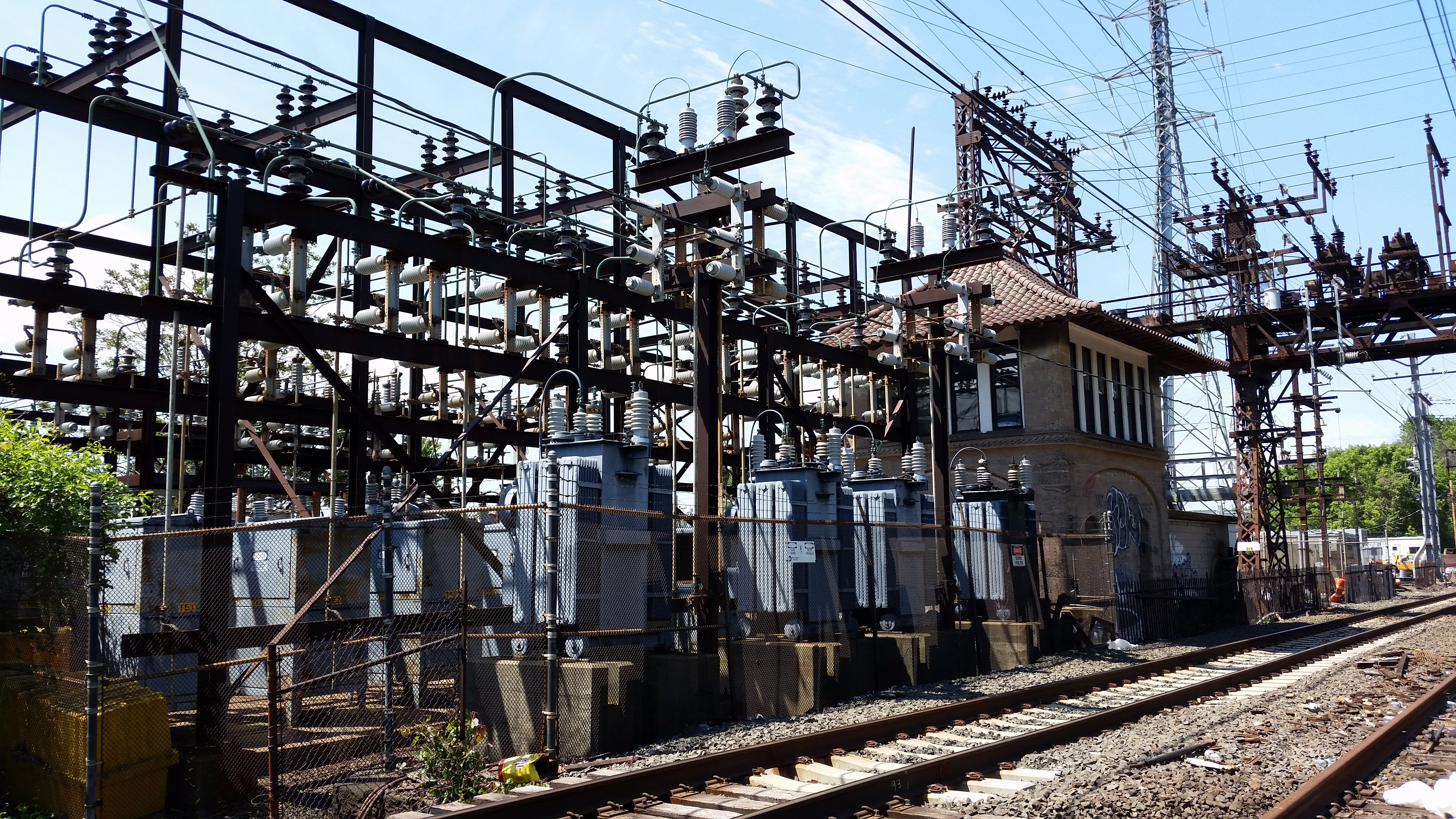
Cos Cob Anchor Bridge Substation on the New Haven Line in Connecticut, U.S.

A traction substation, traction current converter plant, rectifier station or traction power substation (TPSS) is an electrical substation that converts electric power from the form provided by the electrical power industry or railway owned traction power network to an appropriate voltage, current type and frequency to supply trains, trams (streetcars) or trolleybuses with traction current. A traction power substation may also refer to a site that supplies a railway traction power network with power from the public electricity utility.

== Function ==
The exact functions and power conversions made by a traction substation depends on the type of electrification system in use. Broadly there are three categories of electrification system each with different system architectures: Low Voltage DC Electrification (using conductor rail of overhead line), High Voltage Low Frequency AC Electrification with overhead line, and 25 kV mains frequency AC with overhead line.

However, across all systems, traction substations can be defined as any site where multiple overhead line or conductor rail circuits are connected to through (usually) circuit breakers to a busbar. This allows for two functions.

1. To provide the capability to isolate specific sections of electrification either automatically (due to fault conditions detected by the breaker or other equipment) or remotely by the action of an electrical control operator for the purposes emergency situations of engineering work.
2. To reduce overall volt drop of the system by paralleling electrification circuits together.

Beyond this, many substations will have additional functions for providing new power to the electrification circuits (from grid connections, other high voltage cables, a stepdown transformer or transformer with rectifier) or for separating different supplies apart from each other by way of circuit breakers fitted between sections of the busbar that are normally open (from now on "normally open points").

But at their core all substations will at least perform those initial two functions, and will revert to that basic state in degraded operations, such as if a particular supply or step-down transformer at a specific site falls offline. Because of these two basic principles, substations are often located at or near major stations and junctions between multiple electrified lines so as to allow for flexibility in switching and feeding arrangements. But also for regular substations to be spaced across long distances of plain line to reduce volt drop.

In terms of busbar configuration, railway substations are almost always radial, the simplest type.

=== 600–3,000 V DC Overhead Line or Conductor Rail ===
Low voltage DC systems were the first kind of electrification to emerge in the late 1800s using both overhead line and conductor rail collection. Although many countries (especially in Japan and across Europe) implemented 1.5 kV or 3 kV DC overhead line networks across mixed traffic mainline networks, the system is mostly deployed nowadays on rapid transit, or short distance/high frequency suburban systems as well as light rail, trams and trolleybuses. 750 V is the standard for metros using conductor rail collection and tram or light rail (using overhead line) while 1.5 kV is the standard for metros and commuter systems using overhead line collection.

The main benefit of these systems is the relative lack of on-board conversion equipment required by the train with it possible to connect the traction current directly to the traction motor control equipment. This is opposed to AC electrification which requires voltage transformation and (typically) rectification on board every train. However, the lower line voltage means a greater number of tractions substations must be built with the DC current needing to be supported at regular intervals of between 2 and 12 km (1.2 and 7.5 miles) depending on exact system voltage and traffic levels/line speed. Although a higher line voltage would decrease the number of substations needed, the maximum traction voltage of a DC system is limited by

1. the physical size on-board traction motors can be (higher voltages require larger insulation components)
2. the expense and complexity of rectification equipment for higher voltages (especially historically speaking)
3. the difficulty in breaking DC fault currents
4. if conductor rail electrification is preferred, this limits voltage to a maximum of 1,200 V due to insulation requirements

The frequent substation spacing and relative lack of on-train equipment required means low-voltage DC system see regular use on short distance/high frequency railways (like metros) because the number of trains running will be greater than the number of transformers and rectifiers installed in traction substations when route distances are short and train frequencies high.

==== Architecture ====
This need for many regular DC supply points means low voltage DC systems are likely to utilise a high voltage 3 phase AC traction power network, although this isn't always the case. Broadly speaking, DC electrification that uses traction power networks are typically larger metros and suburban networks started in the early 20th century when public electricity infrastructure was not as readily available (since DC electrification dates back to the late 19th century). While DC electrification installations that connect to the public utility grid at every traction substation were typically installed more recently or are tram systems since public electricity infrastructure is most dense in urban areas.

Traction power networks for DC electrification utilise high voltage 3 phase AC current at utility frequency (50 or 60 Hz) and at common voltages of 11, 22, 33 or 66 kV although lower voltages have been used historically. 50–60 Hz 3-phase AC is not only used for its efficient power transmission properties but also for easy integration with the local electricity grid made possible by the fact that AC/DC rectifiers can easily be fed with 3-phase AC. The railway traction power network primarily supports multiple DC Traction Substations (TSS) where the current is converted to low voltage DC for the railway electrification system. Trains then collect the low voltage DC current which can be fed directly to a motor control system, either resistor banks for DC motors or an inverter motor drive for 3 phase AC motors.

==== Types of substation ====
===== Grid Supply Point (GSP) =====
This is a substation where the railway's traction power network is supplied by the local electricity grid. Since traction power networks for DC railways can be three-phase and can be rated at voltage levels similar to that of the electricity grid in that jurisdiction, grid supply points are often simply switching stations where incoming grid circuits are collected to a busbar and then distributed on the railway side. Or, if the railway load is especially high, the electricity supplier can provide dedicated transformers for railway use supporting the railway traction power network from a higher grid voltage (like ~132 kV). Typically, the supplies from different grid supply points are kept separated within the traction power network by using normally open circuit breakers. This is done to limit the impact of a HV fault and to ensure the correct load is being drawn from each grid supply point to avoid over currents (each grid site in a railway system is normally rated for a different power draw).

===== Traction Substation (TSS) =====
This is where the high voltage 3-phase AC of the traction power network is first stepped down to the traction current voltage (600–3,000 V) using a power transformer then rectified to DC before being distributed to the immediate overhead line or conductor rail circuits. The AC switchboard of a typical DC traction substation normally connects to multiple AC circuits allowing for the substation to be fed from two different points for resiliency, and the ability to move the normally open point between different grid supplies around the traction power network. It may also support other auxiliary transformers to supply railway signalling systems, tunnel drainage pumps or station domestic supplies. Where a traction power grid is not used, the three-phase voltage from the local utility is stepped down and rectified in the traction substations to provide the required DC voltage. The typical physical spacing of DC traction substations depends primarily on the traction power voltage supplied to the trains but also the traffic demand and average line speed.

DC Substation Spacing
DC Electrification Voltage	Spacing of Traction Substations (TSS)
600 V	2–3 km (1.2–1.9 miles)
750 V	Around 3 km (1.9 miles)
1,500 V	2–8 km (1.2–5.0 miles)
3,000 V	7.5–12.5 km (4.7–7.8 miles)

====== Signalling Power ======
Railway signalling and telecoms systems generally have their own LV supplies off of the local electricity grid. However, for added supply security, it's common for signalling supplies to also draw from the 3-phase AC traction power network at traction substations with either one or two transformers dedicated to signalling supply.

===== Track Paralleling Hut (TPH) =====
The distance between traction substations can be increased by installing one or more track paralleling huts between adjacent traction substations. A track paralleling hut provides means for each overhead line or conductor rail circuit to be electrically paralleled at a shared DC busbar. This allows for more efficient use of available power by connecting more trains in parallel to supply points reducing volt drop.

===== Tee'd Substation =====
This is similar to a TSS but refers to a situation where the DC substation has no ability to switch high voltage AC circuits and is permanently attached to a particular circuit of the traction power network as opposed to a normal traction substation which can switch AC circuits to some extent. Tee'd substations have less operational resiliency than normal TSSs but save in installation and operational cost since no AC switchboard is built other than a single circuit breaker. Track Paralleling Huts are often converted into tee'd substations as a cost effective way to increase the available power to a railway line.

=== 12–15 kV AC overhead line ===
Higher voltage AC electrification at low frequency is almost as old as low voltage DC systems being implemented as early as 1904. Originally, the low frequency AC system fundamentally relied on the utilisation of universal motors with AC current of a frequency between 16 and 25 Hz. In the early 1900s, the technology did not exist to implement rectifiers or power electronics on board trains so engineers were limited in methods to run traction motors. Higher frequencies (like those which came to be used by the electrical supply frequency) were found to create intolerable arcing between motor components but at lower frequencies these problems were resolved. This allowed for trains to be fed at a high line voltage which can be then stepped down by an onboard transformer to a voltage appropriate for a traction motor, then fed directly as AC to the motors. Almost all AC systems that have been implemented at scale use single-phase AC due to the mechanical and practical complexities of duplicating catenary systems as is required by 3-phase AC electrification

In the early years of railway electrification, the main advantage of low frequency AC systems was that AC can be fed to trains at a much higher voltage than that which is optimal for the traction motors since the AC voltage can be stepped down on board the train rather than matching exactly what is required by the traction motor (like on DC electrification since DC cannot be stepped up or down by transformers). This leads to several further advantages of an AC electrification system

1. Line voltage can be set much higher allowing for far fewer substations to be built as high voltage transmission of electricity is more efficient over distance.
2. The higher line voltage can allow for much more power to be delivered to trains allowing for high speed rail and heavy freight traffic
3. Higher line voltage means catenary wires can be thinner since power is being transmitted by high voltage instead of a high current reducing material cost not only from the thinner wiring but also from the reduced weight of overhead line support structures since they are now supporting a lighter installation.

AC electrification and low frequency became the standard system for suburban, mixed traffic and high speed lines in Germany, Austria and Switzerland at 15 kV 16.7 Hz; Sweden and Norway at 15 kV 16 2/3; and some parts of Northeast USA at 12 kV 25 Hz. Historically, line voltages of between 6.6 kV and 11 kV were implemented.

==== Architecture ====
What came to be the main disadvantage of low frequency AC electrification was that it required single phase AC power at a specific non-standard frequency (between 16.667 and 25 Hz). Both low frequency AC and low voltage DC systems originally needed to implement their own traction power networks and power generation stations fundamentally because national utility grids did not exist in the early 1900s. However, as the general purpose electrical supply grids grew in size and scope throughout the 20th century, they standardised on 3-phase AC transmission at 50 or 60 Hz. Low voltage DC systems could easily integrate their traction power networks with the electrical supply industry since they would have already been 3-phase and did not require a specific frequency allowing DC railways to generally forgo the need for traction power stations. However, low frequency AC systems became non-standard and incompatible with electrical supply industry at large due to being single phase and a different frequency. Interactions between low frequency AC electrification and national power grids therefore require complex and expensive machinery (and later power electronics) to convert three-phase 50 Hz or 60 Hz alternating current (AC) for the supply of AC railway electrification systems at a lower frequency and single phase.

Similarly to DC systems, low frequency AC systems may utilise a traction power network at voltages of between 55 kV and 138 kV to support overhead line voltages of either 12 kV or 15 kV. Unlike DC systems though, these traction power networks are necessarily single phase and low frequency. Alternatively, some low frequency AC systems (such as in Norway, parts of Sweden and north-east Germany) are decentralised meaning overhead line traction substations connect directly to the electrical supply industry with each substation requiring individual frequency and phase conversion equipment.

For administrations that use centralised traction power networks, the distribution voltage is 55 kV in some parts of Austria, 66 kV in some parts of Switzerland,110 kV in Germany and most of Austria, 132 kV in most of Switzerland and Sweden, and 138 kV on the southern section of the Northeast Corridor in the USA. In either centralised or decentralised systems, it's common for the traction power network and the relevant overhead line electrification to utilise autotransformer feeding (sometimes referred to as balanced line transmission) meaning that a 15 kV railway is actually fed by a 30 kV transformer with +15 kV connected to the contact wire, a centre tap earthed to the running rails, and -15 kV connected to external feed wires. At points between railway substations, the negative feed wires are connected to the positive contact wires by autotransformers in order to allow a greater current in the contact wire. Similarly, a 110 kV transmission line is in fact made up of three wires at +55 kV, 0 V and -55 kV making 110 kV in total between all conductors.

Either way, 12 kV or 15 kV AC is collected by trains and stepped down by an on-board transformer to a voltage appropriate to traction motors. In newer trains, it may also be rectified to DC in order to feed a 3-phase traction motors via a motor drive.

==== Substations ====
===== Centralised Converter Station =====
These substations convert between 3-phase 50 Hz or 60 Hz power from the electrical supply industry to single phase low frequency power for use in a high voltage (55 kV—138 kV) traction power network. They may also directly supply the 12 kV–15 kV overhead line locally if the substation is near to a railway line. Converter stations may utilise motor-generator machinery or solid state power electronics.

===== Traction Substation =====
In the context of a railway traction power network with traction power stations or centralised converter stations, this refers to a site where the traction power network feeds a stepdown transformer to feed overhead lines at either 12 kV or 15 kV depending on country.

===== Decentralised Converter Station =====
This refers to a site where 3-phase 50 or 60 Hz power is provided by the electrical supply industry and converted to single phase low frequency AC and transformed directly to traction current voltage to be supplied to overhead lines local to that substation

===== Autotransformer Site =====
These substations occur at the 12-15 kV level at the overhead line equipment and serve to connect negative feed wires to contact wires via autotransformers in order to increase the possible distance between supplying substations. These are not actually unique to low frequency AC systems and can be found on mains frequency AC railways (see below) that utilise autotransformer feeding.

=== 25 kV AC (50 Hz or 60 Hz) Overhead Line ===
This is the most common type of electrification for modern mixed traffic, long distance and high speed railways and sees use around the world. Often considered the modern-day standard, it only became available from the late 1950s and so is often seen in countries whose railway networks started electrifying later. Some administrations use alternate voltages of 20 kV or 12.5 kV but the system is functionally the same.

The use of alternating current of 50 or 60 Hz indicates that the system directly connects the local electricity grid to the overhead line circuits giving the system the simplest architecture requiring no complex frequency or current conversion equipment at substations and are always decentralised requiring no traction power network. But in comparison to DC electrification, it requires more on-board train equipment typically transformers and rectifiers to convert the current to a lower DC voltage (typically around 800 V) in order to power DC motors or 3 phase AC motors via an inverter motor drive. And in comparison to both DC and low frequency AC systems, mains frequency 25 kV AC has the disadvantage of requiring overhead line neutral sections through which trains must coast. Neutral sections represent a complex constraint that must be carefully planned around to ensure trains are unlikely to be stranded within one. But like low frequency AC, the 25 kV system enjoys those same benefits of high voltage AC transmission: reduced number of substations, simpler and lighter overhead line designs compared to DC, and higher available power.

==== Architecture ====
Mains frequency 25 kV AC electrification is more architecturally similar to DC electrification than low frequency AC. While DC electrification has closely spaced substations fitted with transformers and rectifiers off of a HV AC supply, in 25 kV AC the individual trains are effectively mobile substations with their own transformers and rectifiers and the overhead line performs a dual role of the traction power network and traction current delivery system both of which are separate equipment in a DC system. 25 kV AC moves the interface between infrastructure and train to the point of the HV AC network, whereas DC electrification places it much further down the chain between motor control and DC supply.

When directly opposed to DC electrification, 25 kV AC is more economical for a system that is long distance with relatively low frequencies since the total number of transformers and rectifiers is fewer if they are installed on the trains as opposed to substations every few kilometres where route length is especially high. This is in addition to the fact 25 kV AC is the most viable option for delivering high enough power to trains for high speed of heavy freight operations.

===== Overhead Line Neutral Sections =====
The significant difference between the architecture of DC electrification and mains frequency 25 kV AC is that the railway's HV AC distribution network is single phase in 25 kV AC as opposed to 3-phase. This is because of the practical difficulties of duplicating overhead line equipment that would be required by 3-phase OLE. This makes grid connections more complex because the railway must connect to a local power grid at a high enough voltage to accommodate the highly unbalanced railway load. This also means adjacent grid connections must always be insulated from another within the overhead line system and no kind of paralleling can occur achieved through the use of overhead line neutral sections.

The more common and simpler type of neutral section is an arrangement of permanently earthed contact wire with in line insulators at either end. Some kind of trackside balise system activates the train's circuit breakers just before entering the neutral section in order to prevent damaging arcs that would occur if the pantograph suddenly lost contact with the energised conductor. After coasting through the neutral section, further balises at the other side automatically reclose the circuit breaker in the new supply area. An alternative method involves automatically operating switches within the OLE system that handle the transfer between supplies within a short area of OLE that is able to be always powering the train. Automatic switching requires complex control equipment that must be implemented with train detection equipment.

OLE Neutral Sections are unique to the 25 kV system but are architecturally equivalent to the normally open points found within the traction power network of DC electrification. However the 3-phase AC traction power networks used in DC electrification can parallel grid connections together at least to a certain extent. This is generally impossible in 25 kV AC, although the more recent utilisation of power electronics within the traction power system opens up the possibility of removing neutral sections.

==== Traction Power System ====
Within 25 kV electrification, "Traction Power System" refers to the equipment owned and operated by the grid supplier that provides an extra high voltage (EHV) single phase connection for a railway up to and including the supply transformers. For a standard system using "classic" feeding, the primary side of the supply transformer will normally connect to at least a 100 kV supply in order to mitigate the disbalance of the single phase load. The 25 kV secondary side generally has a rating between 10M VA and 26.5 MVA setting the fault current of the system at 6kA.

Some 25 kV railways utilise autotransformer feeding (AT) where an additional conductor at -25 kV is installed as part of the OLE adjacent to the contact and catenary lines. The additional current from the negative conductor is allowed to supply the contact line at regular intervals (typically every 10 km (6.2 miles)) where autotransformers connect the two conductors. The autotransformer system overall has the range of 50 kV compared to classic feeding arrangements and is common but not unique to high speed railways. Due to the fact AT railways draw 50 kV, the primary side of the supply transformer often connects to the grid at higher voltages than conventional systems. This also allows AT fed railways to specify supplying transformers at much higher ratings, typically from 40 MVA to 80 MVA for conventional heavy rail, and up to 150 MVA on high speed systems. AT railways typically provide a fault current of 12 kA.

In more recent times, some 25 kV traction power systems have implemented power electronics able to dynamically manipulate voltage, phase and current in order to supply the single phase overhead line with all three phases of the public utility grid. This has 3 main advantages: higher available power from the use of a stronger connection and the active voltage control, balancing the demand made of the public utility which significantly reduces the negative externalities associated with supplying the railway, the possibility of removing neutral sections since all the 25k V outputs can be synchronised.

===== Grid Supply Point (GSP) =====
A grid supply point refers to a substation where the national electrical supply industry steps down transmission or sub-transmission voltages through supply transformers dedicated to railway usage down to 25 kV (or 50 kV for the AT system). The grid supply point is often 1 or 2 transformers within a larger compound performing many operations for that grid supplier and 25 kV feeder circuits will connect from the GSP to a nearby railway feeder station (see below). The 25 kV feeders are usually underground cables but very occasionally may be an overhead powerline. Sometimes the grid supply point will be a dedicated substation built specifically for delivering a 25 kV connection and is tee-d off an overhead or underground transmission voltage powerline. In this case, the associated railway feeder station will be physically adjacent to the grid supplier's site all on the same compound.

==== Power and Distribution ====
Power and Distribution (P&D) refers to the infrastructure between the supply transformers and the overhead line equipment that manages and distributes the traction supply including all railway substations. As opposed to the traction power system, it is always owned and operated by the railway authority. For 25 kV AC electrification, the P&D equipment is substantially less extensive than that of DC railways which operate HV AC traction power networks and multiple step-down substations between every 2 to 7 km (1.2 to 4.3 miles).

25 kV P&D assets will normally consist of traction substations of varying types and some individual HV cables (feeder lines) to provide alternative routes for power to bypass certain sections of overhead line that might be frequently isolated, or to provided dedicated links to sites that will always need it (normally train maintenance depots).

===== Substations =====
====== Feeder Station (FS) ======
A feeder station is a 25 kV switching station that receives power from 25 kV cables, transfers it through a busbar and distributes it to the overhead line circuits through circuit breakers. In the majority of cases, a feeder station is directly associated with a nearby grid supply point and so will be introducing new power to the railway system. However, on rare occasions, multiple geographically distant feeder stations may be all fed from one grid supply point via lengthy independent feeder cables which can be many tens of kilometres.

Most feeder stations will have two grid supplies (from two separate transformers) both of which operate simultaneously feeding in different directions from the FS location. In this case, the FS will be fitted with one or more overhead line neutral sections (OHNS) and associated normally open busbar circuit breakers within the substation. These serve to keep separate the different grid supplies within the FS and within the OLE system as they are often out of phase with one another. Feeder stations with dual supplies are normally expected to be able to provide their full feeding range and the full timetable from one transformer if the other is unavailable. This is known as first emergency feeding (N-1).

Occasionally, a feeder station will have two supplies but only configured to operate with one at a time — the other serving as backup. Or, the feeder station only has one grid supply. In either of these cases, the OLE may have a neutral section at site the FS, unless that substation also acts as the boundary of an adjacent supply area.

Generally, grid supply points and their adjacent feeder stations are located every 40 km (25 miles).

On 2 x 25 kV AT systems, a feeder station is referred to as an autotransformer feeder station (ATFS) and can be spaced up to 60 km (37 miles) from the next ATFS.

====== Track Sectioning Cabin (TSC) ======
A Track Sectioning Cabin is the most basic kind of substation where OLE circuits are connected to a busbar through circuit breakers. They can be useful for sectioning purposes (so will be placed around junctions, and crossovers) or just to parallel circuits together over long distances (similarly to a track paralleling hut on DC systems).

If a TSC was built with outdoor switchgear, it may be referred to as a track sectioning location (TSL) or (rarely) a track sectioning site (TSS).

TSCs can be located up to every 15 km (9.3 miles) apart from other substations.

On 2 x 25 kV AT systems, the equivalent substation is named Sectioning Autotransformer Site (SATS)

====== Midpoint TSC (MPTSC) ======
A Midpoint Track Sectioning Cabin (MPTSC) is a specific type of TSC that acts as the boundary between different grid supplies (provided by feeder stations). Therefore, an MPTSC will always be fitted with neutral sections on the OLE and accompanying normally open circuit breakers between portions of the busbar. If two grid supplies become unavailable at a standard dual FS, the normally open circuit breaker at an MPTSC is closed to allow power from the next FS to be extended around the mid-point. This is known as second emergency feeding and will have an impact of the running of trains normally requiring slower speeds and/or cancelled services.

Sometimes, there will be multiple TSCs fitted with neutral sections and open busbar circuit breakers between two feeder stations. This is to allow the phase break to be moved partially between feeder stations in certain degraded feeding situations that will be specific to that location. In normal feeding some of those TSCs will be bypassed and one of them will be the normal midpoint. Furthermore, TSCs at junction locations may be the boundary of a supply area on one line but not another but may or may not have neutral sections on both branches. Single supply feeder stations also complicate matters, as they may also be fitted with neutral sections to act as a boundary for one supply and introduce a new grip supply for another section. For these reasons, the terms TSC and MPTSC are applied only loosely in practice.

In a generic scenario, an MPTSC is located around 20 km (12 miles) from adjacent feeder stations.

In opposition to midpoint or 'alternative' midpoint substations, a TSC with no OHNS is sometimes referred to as an intermediate TSC (ITSC)

MPTSCs with outdoor switchgear may be referred to as midpoint track sectioning location (MPTSL) or midpoint track sectioning site (MPTSS).

The equivalent AT substation is referred to as midpoint autotransformer site (MPATS) and is around 20 km (12 miles) from adjacent ATFSs.

====== Autotransformer Site (ATS) ======
An autotransformer site (ATS) is a specific kind of substation used on 2 x 25 kV AT fed railways where the -25 kV ATF wire and +25 kV contact wire are connected together through one or more autotransformers allowing the additional current in the ATF wire to be utilised in the contact wire. They are roughly equivalent to ITSCs except that an ATS normally has no circuit breakers and so cannot isolate fault currents or be used for sectioning lines at junctions. An ATS will have remote operated isolator switches which may or may not be able to break load current but can be additionally used in tandem with the circuit breakers at other substations to isolate faults. ATSs are installed every 5–10 km (3.1–6.2 miles) unless there are other substations (ATFS, SATS. MPATS) since all of those will be supplied with autotransformers between their -25 kV and +25 kV busbars.

===== Other P&D equipment =====
====== Principle Supply Point (PSP) ======
Since the 25 kV line is architecturally similar to a HV AC traction power network of a DC system, it is also used to supply signalling equipment at 400 V or 650 V. Unlike with DC systems, these are not only located at 25 kV substations but may also be standalone transformers tee-d off one of the 25 kV contact wires.

== Equipment ==
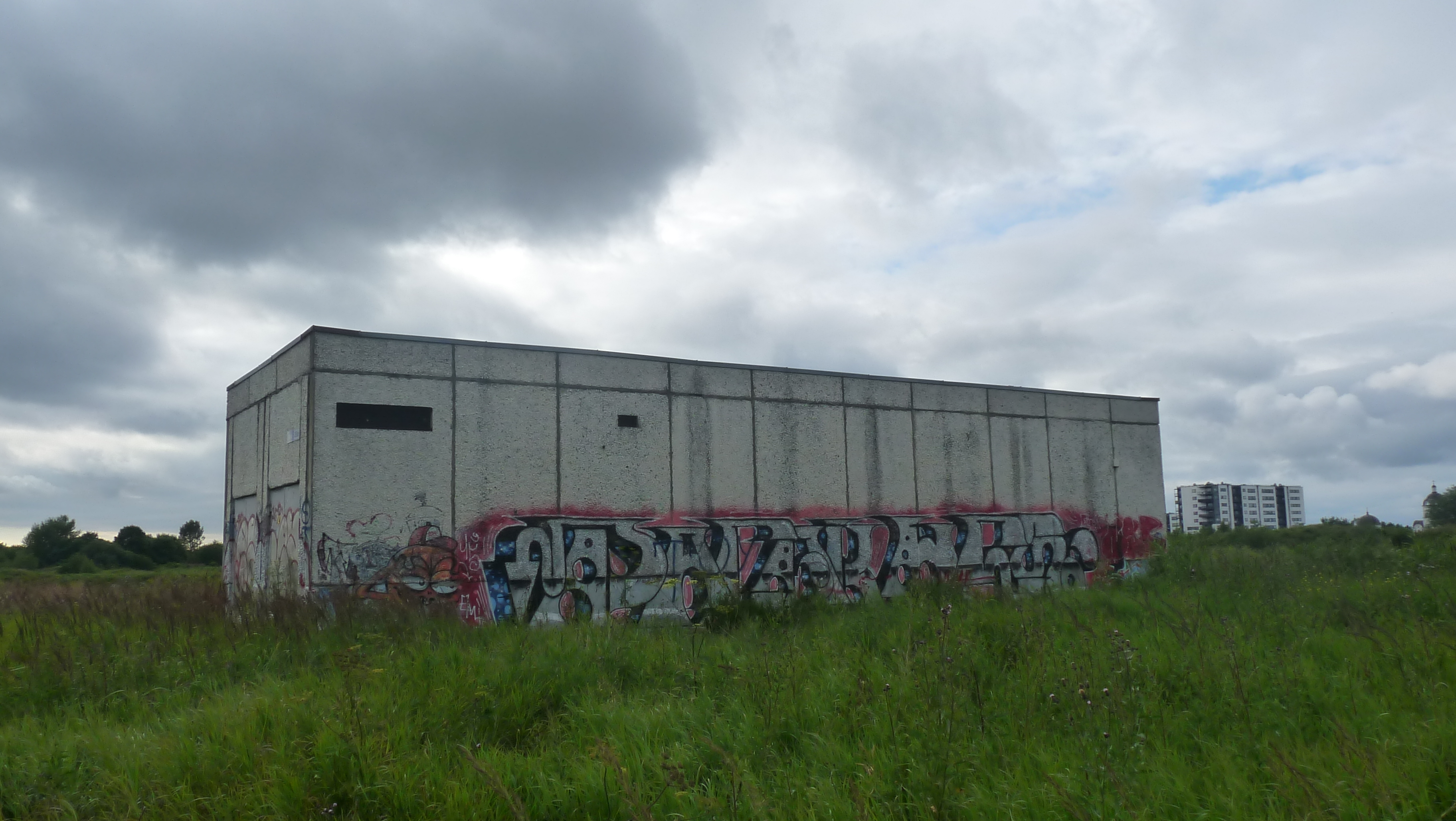
Traction substation in Loopealse, Tallinn, Estonia

=== Rotating ===
Originally, the conversion equipment usually consisted of one or more motor-generator sets containing three-phase synchronous AC motors and single-phase AC generators, mechanically coupled to a common shaft. Rotary converters were also used, especially where the desired output was DC current from an AC source.

=== Static ===
In the 1920s, DC was derived using electronic valves (mercury arc rectifiers). In modern systems, high-voltage DC (HVDC) "back-to-back" stations are used instead of mechanical equipment to convert between different frequencies and phases of AC power and solid-state thyristor rectifier systems are used for conversion from AC power to DC traction power.

== Location ==
Traction current converter plants are either decentralized (where one plant directly supplies the overhead lines or third rail of the traction system, with no feed into a traction current distribution network) or centralized (for the supply of the traction power network, usually in addition to the direct supply of the overhead lines or third rail).

Central traction current converter plants are generally found in Germany (primarily in the cities of Neckarwestheim, Ulm, Nuremberg), Austria and Switzerland, while decentralized traction current converter plants are generally found in Norway, Sweden and the German states of Mecklenburg-Vorpommern and Brandenburg as well as parts of Great Britain. A List of railway electrification systems provides further detail.

== See also ==
- Traction powerstation
- Trolleybus
- Railway electrification system
