= ČSD Class S 499.0 =

Class of electric locomotives

ČSD S 499.0 / 499.1 ČD 240 / ZSSK 240
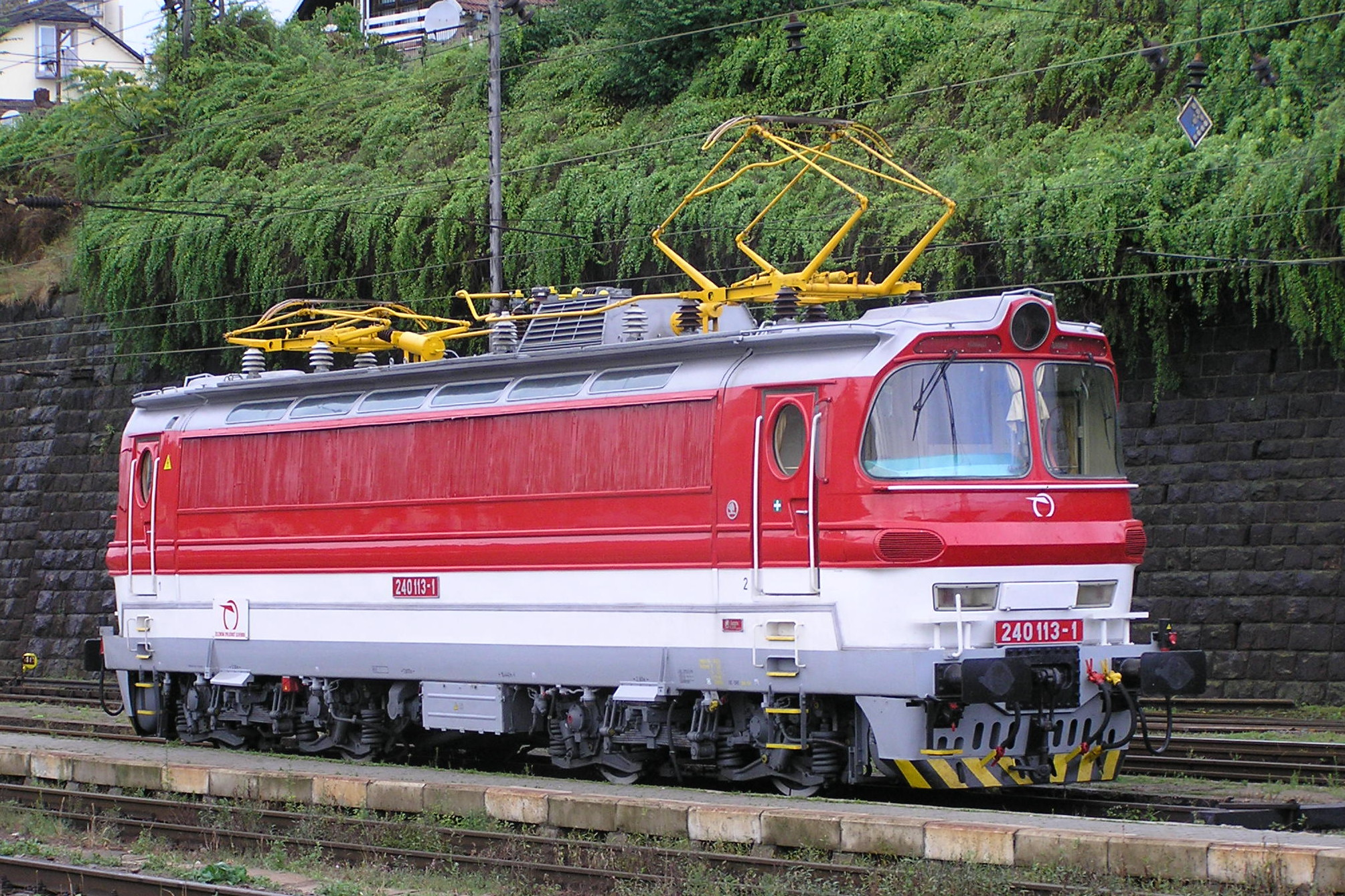
- 240 113-1 of ZSSK
Type and origin
- Power type: Electric
- Builder: Škoda Works
- Build date: 1966–1969
- Total produced: 146
Specifications
- Configuration
  - UIC: Bo′Bo′
- Gauge: 1,435 mm (4 ft 8 1/2 in) standard gauge
- Wheel diameter: 1,250 mm (4 ft 1 in)
- Length: 16,440 mm (53 ft 11 in)
- Loco weight: 85 tonnes (84 long tons; 94 short tons) (86 tonnes (85 long tons; 95 short tons) for 240 260-0)
- Electric system/s: 25 kV 50 Hz AC Overhead lines
- Current pickup: Pantograph
- MU working: yes
- Loco brake: pneumatic, electrodynamic
- Train brakes: pneumatic
Performance figures
- Maximum speed: 120 km/h (75 mph)
- Power output: 3,080 kW (4,130 hp)
Career
- Operators: ČSD » ČD / ZSSK CD Cargo
- Class: ČSD: S 499.0 & S 499.1, later 240; ČD: 240; ZSSK: 240
- Number in class: ČDC: ? ZSSK: 48 passenger + 49 freight
- Numbers: 240 001-8 — 240 145-3, 240 260-0
- Nicknames: Laminátka - because of the material of the locomotive body - made of laminate

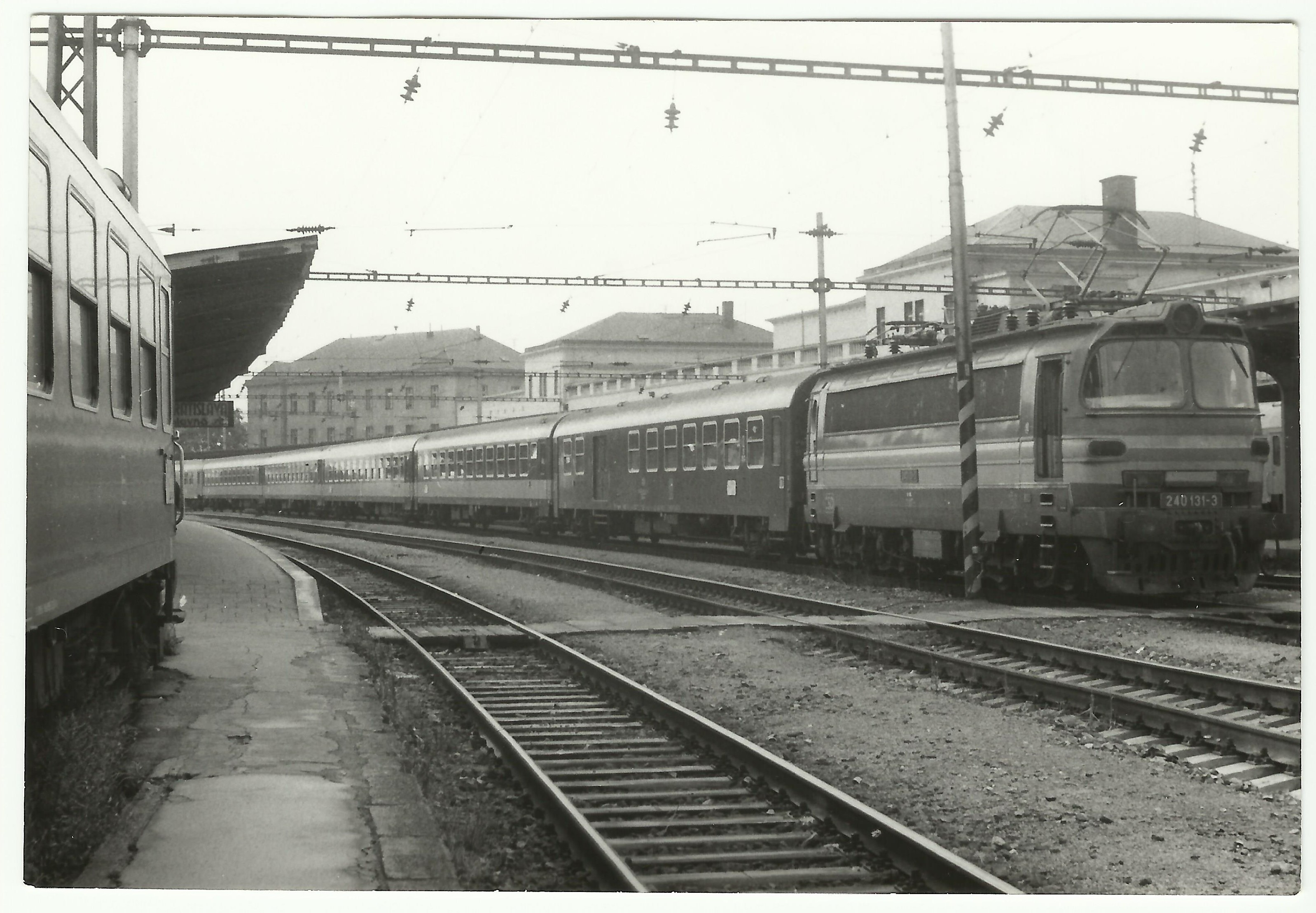
A Class 240 in Bratislava in 1991 with a passenger train.

The ČSD Class S 499.0 and S 499.1 are essentially ČSD Class S 489.0 locomotives with revised gearing for higher speeds and added electrodynamic braking system. They operate from the 25 kV 50 Hz overhead line electrification system in both the Czech Republic and Slovakia. Their design can be traced back to the S699.0 locomotives produced by Škoda in 1962. S 499.0 had a maximum speed of 120 km/h (75 mph), with S 499.1 140 km/h (87 mph).

ČD's cargo division (ČDC) operate the locomotives in the Czech Republic. In Slovakia the fleet is shared almost equally between ZSSK's passenger division and ZSCS, their cargo operations.

== Numbering ==
Locomotives 240 001–8 to 240 120-6 are the original build S 499.0. 240 121–4 to 240 145-3 were converted from S 499.1 by CSD at ŽOS Vrútky, who down-graded the maximum speed to 120 km/h (75 mph). Locomotive 240.260-0 was converted from 230 060–6 in 2002 by fitment of class 240 bogies. It has a few other detail differences to a standard class 240 locomotive (weight is (1 tonne (0.98 long tons; 1.1 short tons) more for example).

== History ==
The Class 240's development can be dated back to 1966 as the CSD S 499.0 and was made mainly for local and regional passenger trains. Due to the material of the body is made of laminate, the locomotives got the nickname Laminatka or Laminate Lady. During 2004 locomotives 240 049–7, 240 055-4 & 240 062-0 were converted to Class 340 by fitment of 15 kV 16.7 Hz electrical equipment and ÖBB signalling/safety equipment. Thus, giving it a multi-system electric power, which allowed it to operate in 15 kV 16.7 Hz electrical equipment and 25 kV 50 Hz electrical equipment. At the moment, only CD Cargo owns these Class 340 locomotives. Now these Class S 499.0/Class 240 locomotives are mainly used for rural, cargo, and urban purposes.

== See also ==
- List of České dráhy locomotive classes

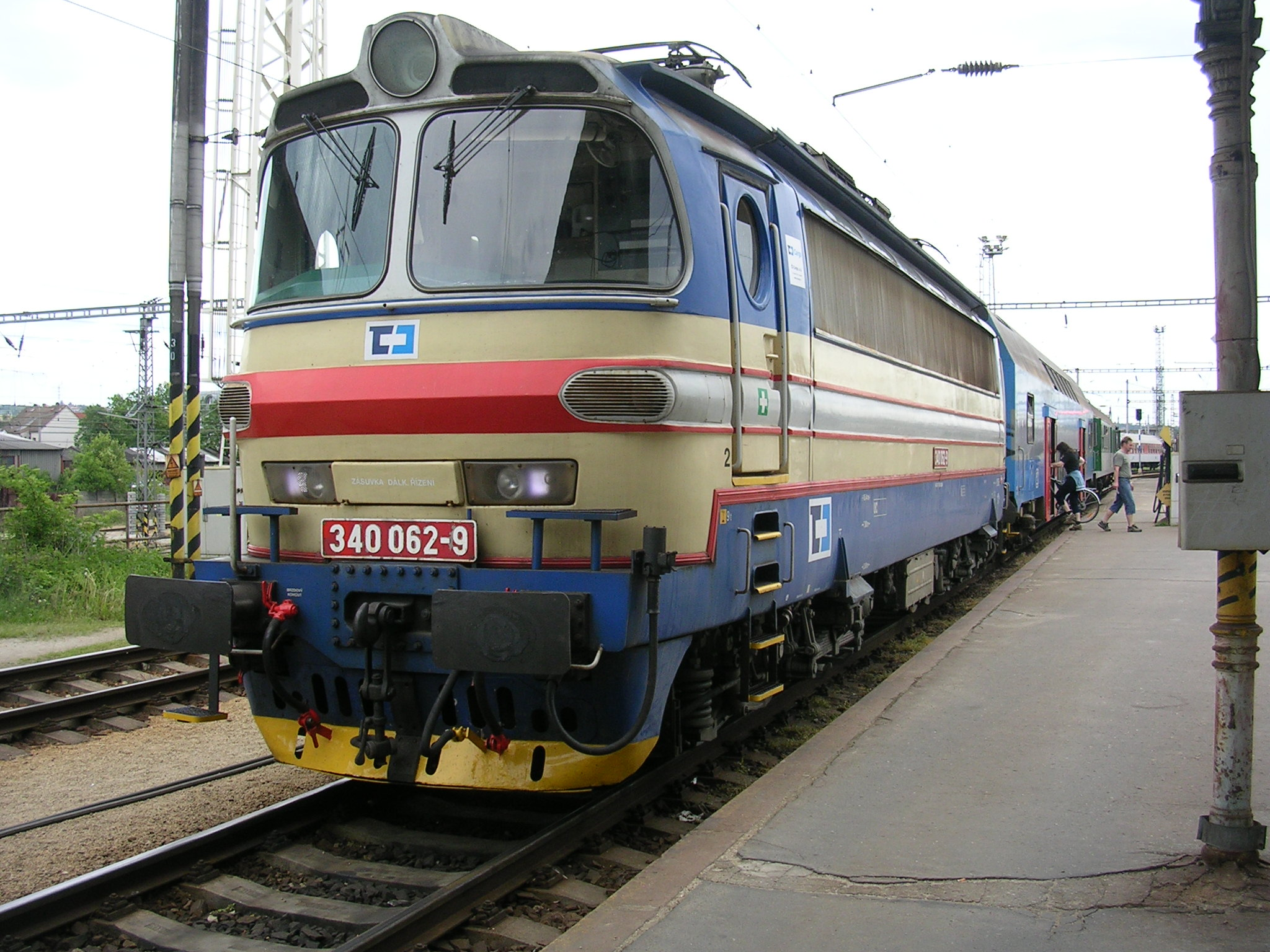
An CSD Class 340 operated by CD Cargo.
