= Traction powerstation =

Traction current producing station

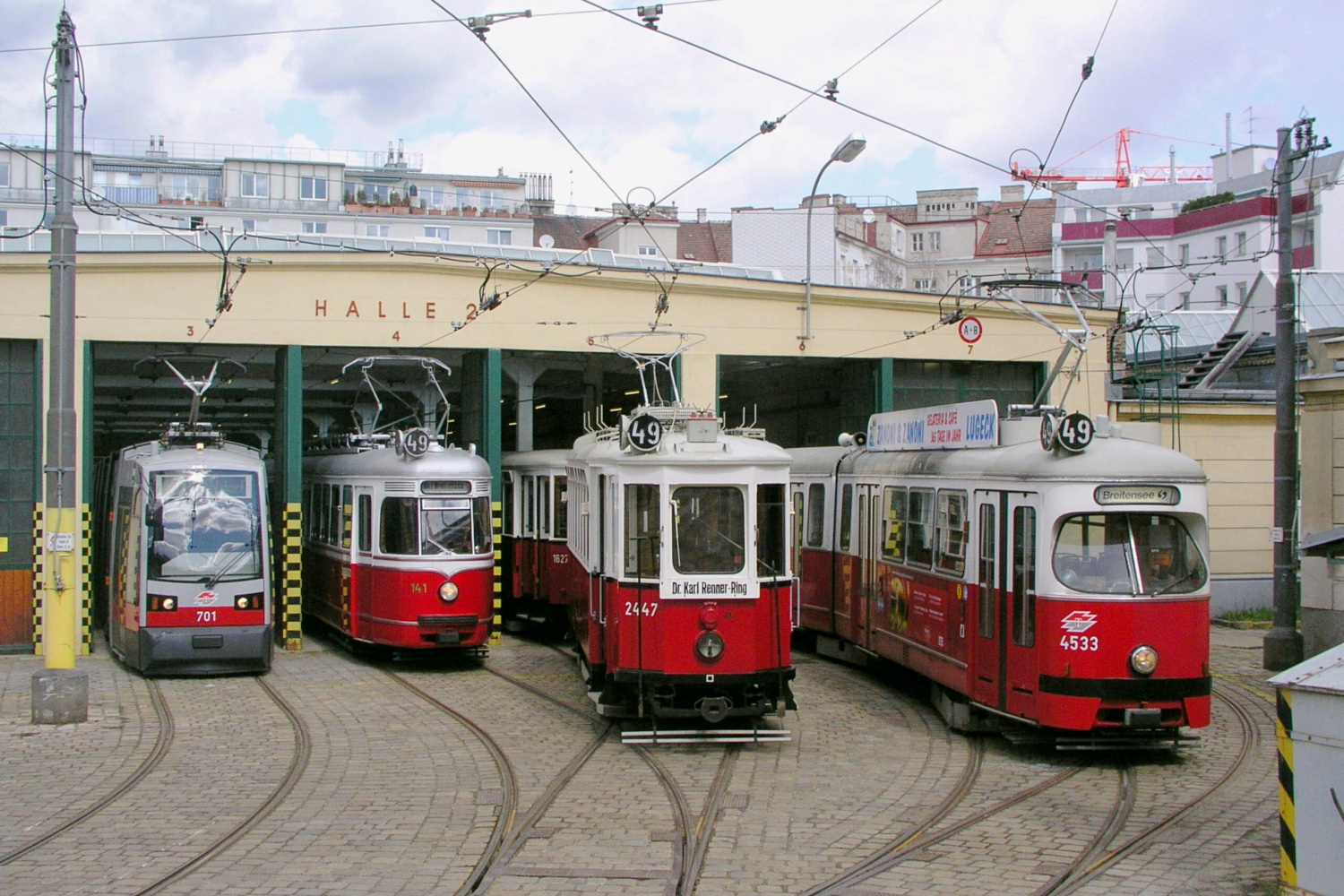
4 Generations of Trams at Breitensee Depot in Vienna

A traction power station is a power station that produces only traction current, that is, electric current used for railways, trams, trolleybuses or other conveyances. Pure traction power stations are rare and there are many more power stations that generate current for other purposes, such as standard three-phase alternating current (AC), in addition to traction current.

== Examples ==
=== Australia ===
- Former Newport A Power Station, operated by the Victorian Railways in Melbourne.

=== Germany ===
- Muldenstein Bahnkraftwerk Muldenstein (German), in the former East Germany
- Nuclear power station Neckarwestheim Nuclear Power Plant (GKN Block 1) The only nuclear power station that produces traction current directly with the world's largest generator for single phase AC.
- Walchensee Hydroelectric Power Station, Bavaria.
- Pump storage power station Langenprozelten.
- Großkraftwerk Power Station in Mannheim.

=== Norway ===
- Hakavik Power Station
- Kjofossen Power Station

=== United Kingdom ===
- Former Lots Road Power Station in Chelsea, London. Provided power to London Underground from 1905 to 2002.

=== United States ===
- Conowingo Dam, and Holtwood Dam on the Susquehanna River provide 25 Hz traction power for the Northeast Corridor in the United States

== See also ==
- Railway electrification system
- Traction substation
- Traction power network
