= Traction power network =

Electricity grid for the supply of electrified rail networks

A traction power network, also known as a traction power supply system, is an electrical distribution system dedicated to supplying power to electrified railways. The installation of a separate traction network generally is done only if the railway in question uses alternating current (AC) with a frequency lower than that of the national grid, such as in Germany, Austria and Switzerland.

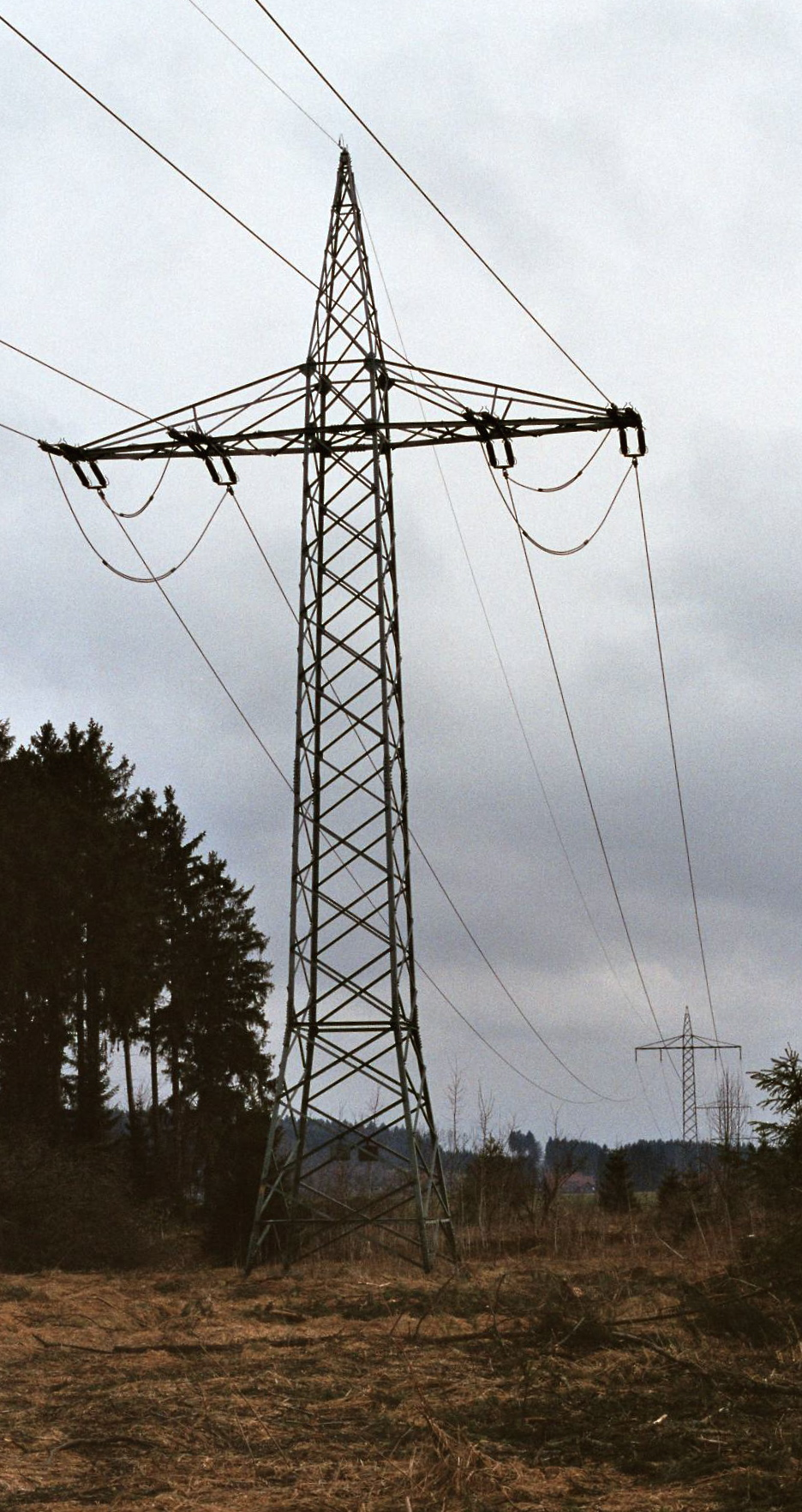
Transposition pylon of power line for single-phase AC traction current (110 kV, 16.7 Hz) near Bartholomä in Germany.

Alternatively, the three-phase alternating current of the power grid can be converted in substations by rotary transformers or static inverters into the voltage and type of current required by the trains. For railways which run on direct current (DC), this method is always used, as well as for railways which run on single-phase AC of decreased frequency, as in Mecklenburg-Western Pomerania, Saxony-Anhalt, Norway and Sweden. In these areas there are no traction current networks.

== History ==
Separate power for traction apart from industrial power has historic roots. There is no reason today to apply different frequencies or current types than for transmission and for industrial usage. However, the advantage with DC traction was the easier transmission with single copper wires to the feeder points. The advantage with AC traction is the easier transmission over long distances to the feeder points. Beyond these parameters and securing former investment, no evidence exists to stay with different current schemes in networks.

== Applications ==
Dedicated traction current lines are used when railways are supplied with low-frequency alternating current (AC). The traction current supply line is connected to substations along the line of the railway and is usually run separately from the overhead catenary wire from which the locomotives are fed.

In countries in which the electric trains run with direct current or with single-phase alternating current with the frequency of the general power grid, the required conversion of the current is performed in the substations, so again no traction current lines are required.

Traction current supply lines are not usually laid parallel to the railway line, in order to allow a shorter line length and to avoid unnecessary influences to the electrical system near the railway line; this also is applied to the current supply of some rapid-transit railways operating with alternating current in Germany.

It is also possible to lay out the traction current supply on special cross beams right on the overhead wire pylons above the catenary wire. Because the overhead line pylons have a smaller cross section than traction current supply masts, the cross beams cannot be too wide, so the standard arrangement of four conductor cables in one level cannot be used. In this case, a two-level arrangement is used, or with two electric circuits for double-railed lines the overhead line pylons for both directions are equipped with cross beams for their own traction current system of two conductor cables each.

In densely populated areas, there are pylons which carry circuits for both traction current and for three-phase alternating current for general power. Such lines are found where rights of way are rare. In particular the parallel route of 110 kV and 220 kV three-phase AC is common. The use of 380 kV power lines on the same pylon requires 220 kV insulators for the traction current line, because in case the 380 kV line fails, voltage spikes can occur along the traction current line, which the 110 kV insulators cannot handle.

As a rule, traction current lines use single conductors, however for the supply of railways with high traffic and in particular for the supply of high speed railway lines, two bundle conductors are used.

== Around the world ==
=== Austria ===
The Mariazell railway in Lower Austria operates on single phase AC at a 25 Hz utility frequency. The railway has its own traction current lines with an operating voltage of 27 kV. These lines are mounted on the pylons of the overhead wire over the catenary wire.

=== Germany ===
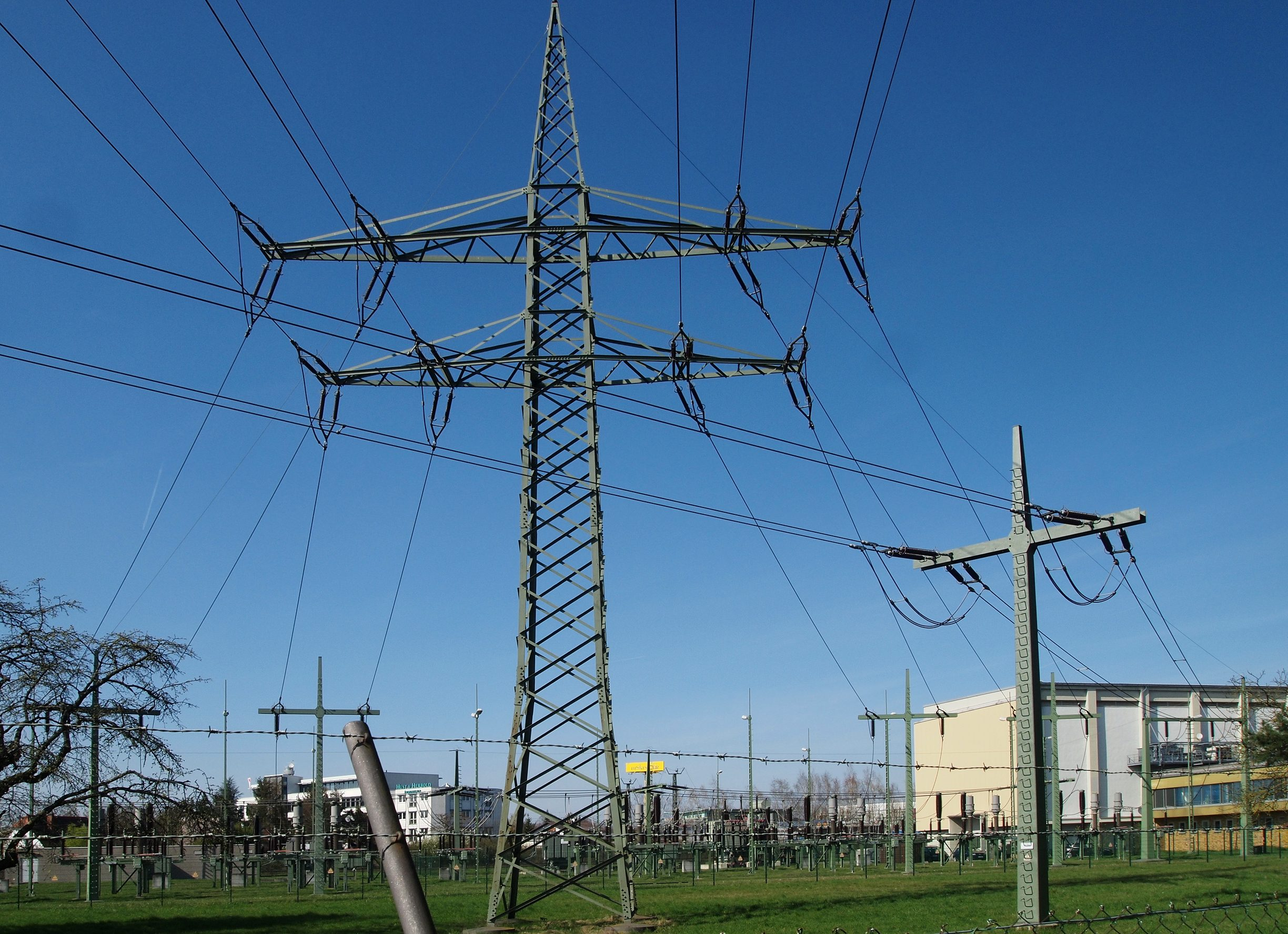
Pylons in a converter plant

In Germany, single conductors are usually used for traction current lines but, for the ICE train, two bundle conductors are used. The traction current supply lines from the nuclear power station Neckarwestheim to the traction current switching station at Neckarwestheim and from there to the central substation in Stuttgart, Zazenhausen are implemented as a four-bundle conductor circuit.

=== Scandinavia ===
In Sweden, Norway and some areas of the former German Democratic Republic, three phase AC is converted into single phase AC with a frequency of 16.7 cycles per second at the substations. Unlike in Western Germany, there are no dedicated power plants for railway electricity. All power comes from general electricity suppliers. Although in this region there is, in principle, no requirement for traction power lines, there is a 132 kV-single AC power grid for railway power supply in Central Sweden (see Electric power supply system of railways in Sweden). In Norway, there is a small 55 kV single phase AC network for power supply of trains in the South, fed by Hakavik Power Station. A further power station, at Kjofossen feeds single phase AC directly in the overhead wire. In Denmark and Finland, 50 Hz is used for the main lines (if electrified) and the electricity comes from general suppliers. As such, much simpler equipment than in Sweden and Norway is needed for conversion.

=== South Africa ===
In the Republic of South Africa there are extensive AC and DC traction schemes, including 50 kV and 25 kV AC single phase systems. Electrification in Natal was stimulated by the takeover of the South African Railways' system by the Electricity Supply Commission (now Eskom) based on the Colenso Power Station.

=== United Kingdom ===
In the United Kingdom, the Network Rail 750 V DC electrification system in the southeast of England is supplied with power from an extensive 33 kV power distribution network.

== Areas with traction power networks ==
- United Kingdom
- Germany (except Mecklenburg-Western Pomerania and Saxony-Anhalt), total length 7,959 km
- Switzerland
- Austria (separate traction power network for the Mariazeller Bahn)
- Central Sweden
- Southern Norway east of Oslo
- USA (Amtrak's former Pennsylvania Railroad lines between Philadelphia and New York City, Washington, D.C., and Harrisburg, PA running with single phase 25 Hz AC, see also Amtrak's 25 Hz traction power system)
- South Africa
- Melbourne, Australia (dedicated high voltage transmission wires between former Newport A Power Station and traction substations. However these lines are operated with three phase AC)
- Riyadh, Kingdom of Saudi Arabia (Riyadh Metro Networks)

== Characteristics ==
Traction current lines are used to power the railway systems of countries which use alternating current of a lower frequency than the public supply. This is typically the case in the German-speaking countries of Europe. For example, 16.7 Hz AC is used in Germany, Austria and Switzerland.

A specific example is the Mariazeller narrow gauge railway in Austria, operating with single phase AC with a frequency of 25 Hz, which has its own traction current lines with an operating voltage of 27 kV. These lines are mounted on the pylons of the overhead wire over the lines.

The voltages used for traction current lines are 110 kV in Germany and Austria and 66 kV or 132 kV in Switzerland.

Traction current lines are operated symmetrically against earth. In the case of 110 kV lines, for example, each conductor has a voltage of 55 kV against earth. The grounding is made in larger substations and in power stations for traction current, using transformers for the cancellation of the earth leakage current. As is the case for all symmetrical powerlines there are also at traction power lines twisting points. A traction powerline for one circuit has usually two conductors. Since most traction current lines possess two electric circuits, four conductors are on the pylons as a rule (in contrast with three-phase alternating current lines, whose number of conductors are an integral multiple of three).

== Routing of traction current lines ==
Traction current lines are not usually laid parallel to the railway line, so as to minimise the line length and to avoid unnecessary influences of electrical system near the railway line. However, there are cases where this practice is not followed (for example, the current supply of some rapid-transit railways operating with alternating current in Germany). In this case, the traction current line is laid on special cross beams of the overhead wire pylons above the overhead line. Because overhead line pylons possess a smaller cross section than traction current masts, these cross beams have to be quite narrow, so the arrangement of four conductor cables in one level, which is standard at traction current lines, cannot be used. Where four conductors are needed, one approach is to employ a two-level arrangement of conductor cables. Alternatively, in cases of double-tracked railway lines, the overhead line pylons for both driving directions are equipped with cross beams for the traction current system (two conductor cables).

In densely populated areas, where rights of way are rare, it is common to find pylons which carry electric circuits for traction current as well as those for three-phase alternating current. The latter can be 110 kV, 220 kV, or, in some cases, 380 kV three phase AC lines. In such cases, the traction current lines must use insulators which can cope with the maximum peak-to-peak voltage which can occur between the lines.

Traction current lines are implemented as a rule as single leaders. For the supply of railways with much rail traffic and in particular for the power supply of high speed railway lines such as the German ICE (Inter City Express) trains, conductors of two bundles are used. The traction current lines from the nuclear power station at Neckarwestheim to the traction current switching station at Neckarwestheim, and from the traction current switching station at Neckarwestheim to the central substation in Stuttgart Zazenhausen are implemented as four-bundle conductors.

Traction current lines are always equipped with an earth conductor. In some cases, two earth conductors are used: for example in, Germany, in cases where the traction current line is carried on pylons together with three phase AC, like the line to the nuclear power station at Neckarwestheim. Similarly, in Austria there are some traction current lines equipped with two earth ropes.

== Alternatives to traction current lines ==
In Sweden, Norway and some areas of the former GDR three phase AC from the public grid is converted into single phase AC with a frequency of 16.7 Hz in substations close to the railways. In these regions there are no traction current lines.

Also in countries in which the electric trains run with direct current or with single phase AC with the frequency of the general power grid, the required conversion of the current is performed in the substations, so that in these countries no traction current lines are needed.

== See also ==
- Third rail
- Traction current converter plant
- Traction powerstation
