= ČD Class 340 =

Czech multisystem electrical locomotive

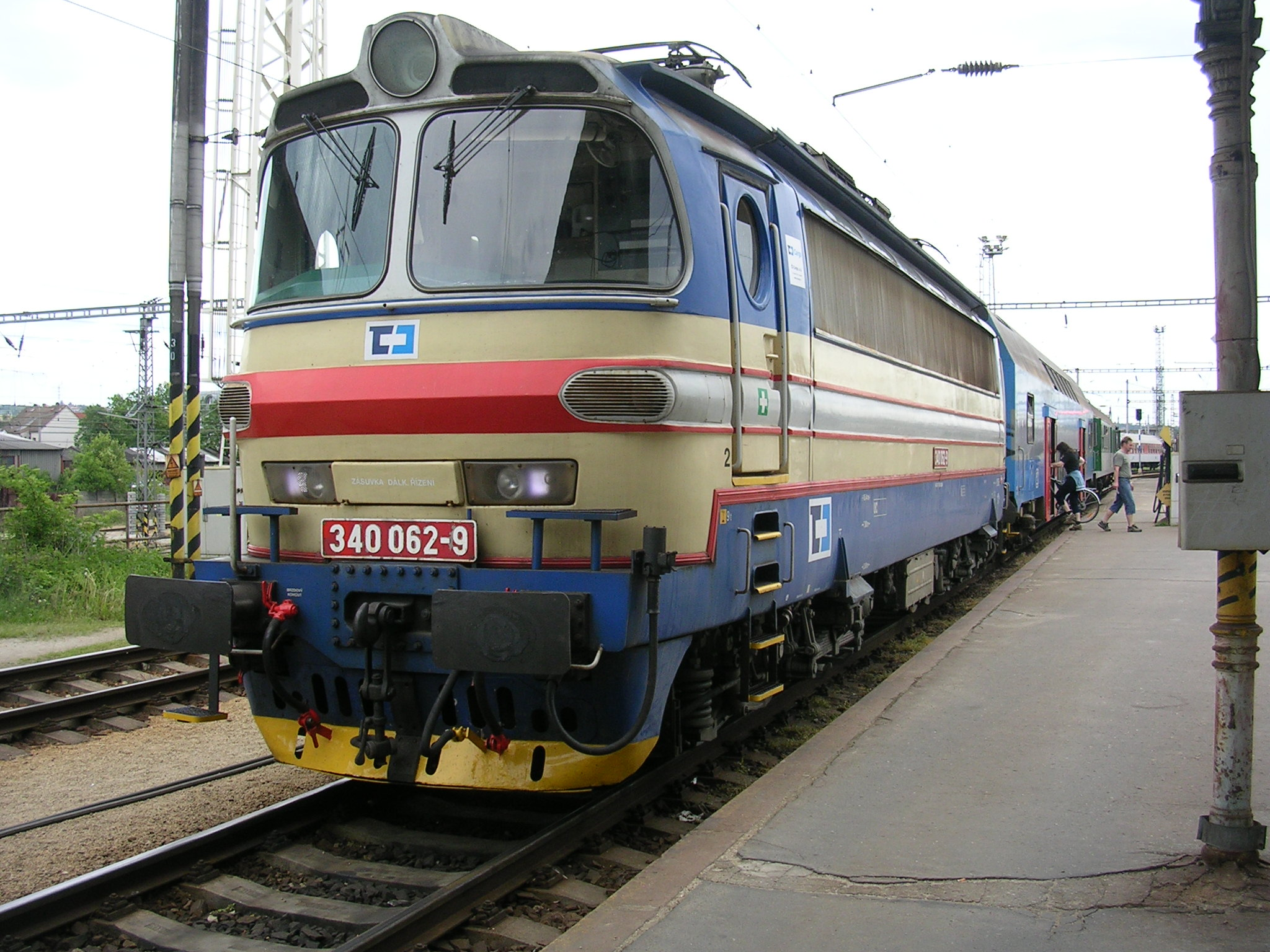
Type and origin
- Power type: Electric
- Build date: 2003–2004
- Total produced: 3
Specifications
- Configuration
  - AAR: B-B
  - UIC: Bo'Bo'
  - Commonwealth: Bo-Bo
- Gauge: 1,435 mm (4 ft 8 1/2 in)
Career
- Operators: ČD Cargo
- Nicknames: Modrá laminátka (Blue laminate lady)

The ČD Class 340 is a multisystem electric locomotive, designed for use between the Czech Republic and Austria. A total of three locomotives were rebuilt from the earlier 240 class. Since 2007, all three have been allocated to ČD Cargo.

== History ==
When the railway from Horní Dvořiště, in the Czech Republic to Summerau, in Austria, was electfied, this left ČD with a problem. They owned no locomotives that could operate on both the Czech 25 kV 50 Hz electrification, and the Austrian 15 kV 16.7 Hz electrification. This left ČD having to use ČD 771 class diesel locomotives on these trains. It was decided to convert the 340 class from the 240 class, due to a shortage of the originally intended 163 class.

== Bibliography ==
1. "340". Atlas Lokomotiv (in Czech). Archived from the original on 25 October 2019.
