= Kjofossen Power Station =

Building in Aurland, Sogn og Fjordane, Norway

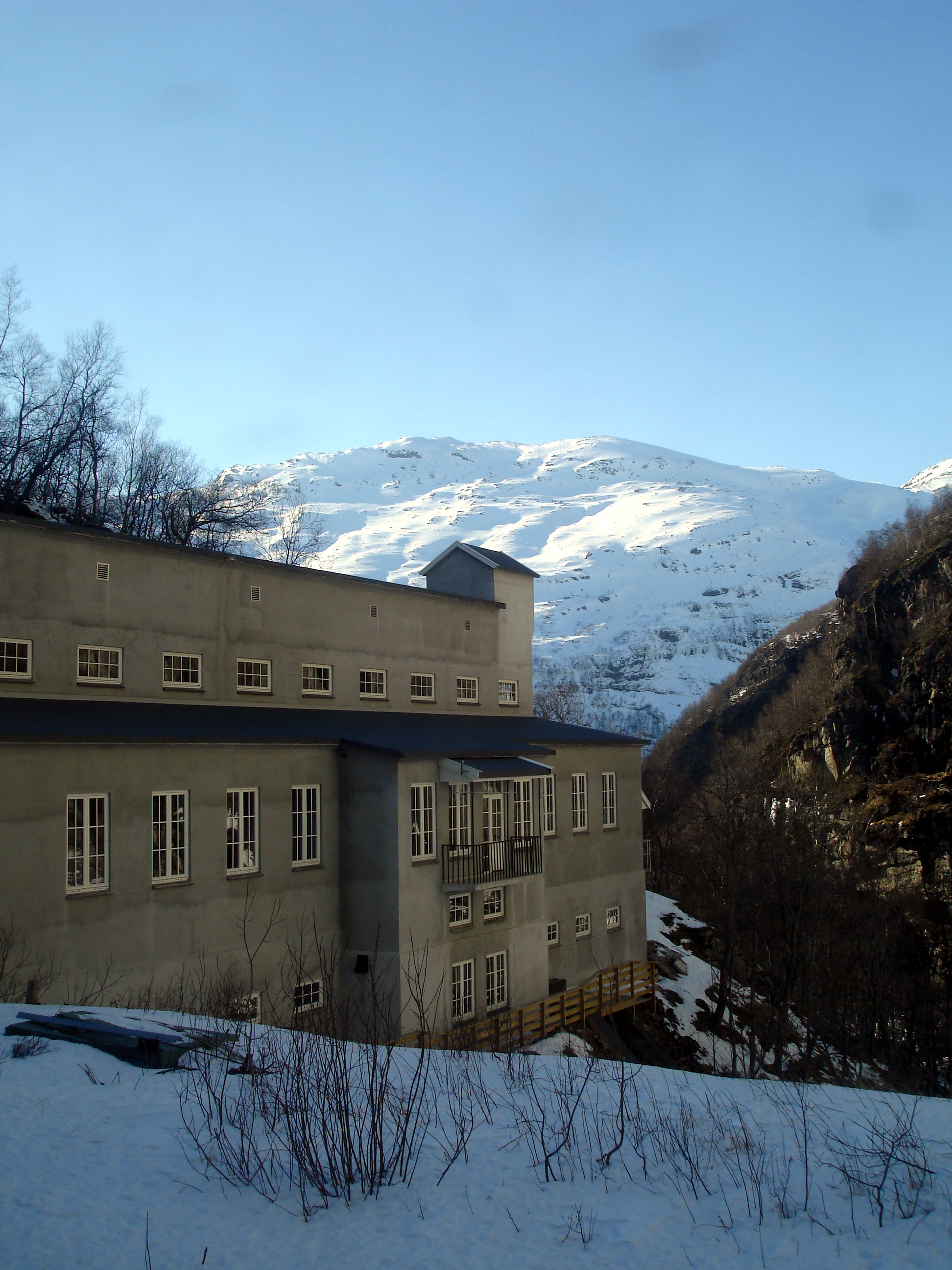
- Kjofossen Power Station
- Interactive map of Kjofossen Power Station
- Official name: Kjosfoss kraftverk
- Country: Norway
- Coordinates: 60.74698°N 7.13490°E
- Status: Operational
- Opening date: October 27, 1944; 81 years ago
- Owner: Bane Energi

Power Station
- Hydraulic head: 97 m
- Turbines: 2
- Installed capacity: 3.5 MW
- Capacity factor: 78.3%
- Annual generation: 24 GW·h

Kjofossen Power Station is a hydroelectric power plant at Vestland built during World War II. Part of its power is used as railway traction current, i.e. single-phase electric power at 16 2/3 hertz, fed directly into the overhead wire of the railway to Bergen. The only other power station in Norway to produce traction current is Hakavik Power Station.

== See also ==
- Hakavik Power Station
