= Hakavik Power Station =

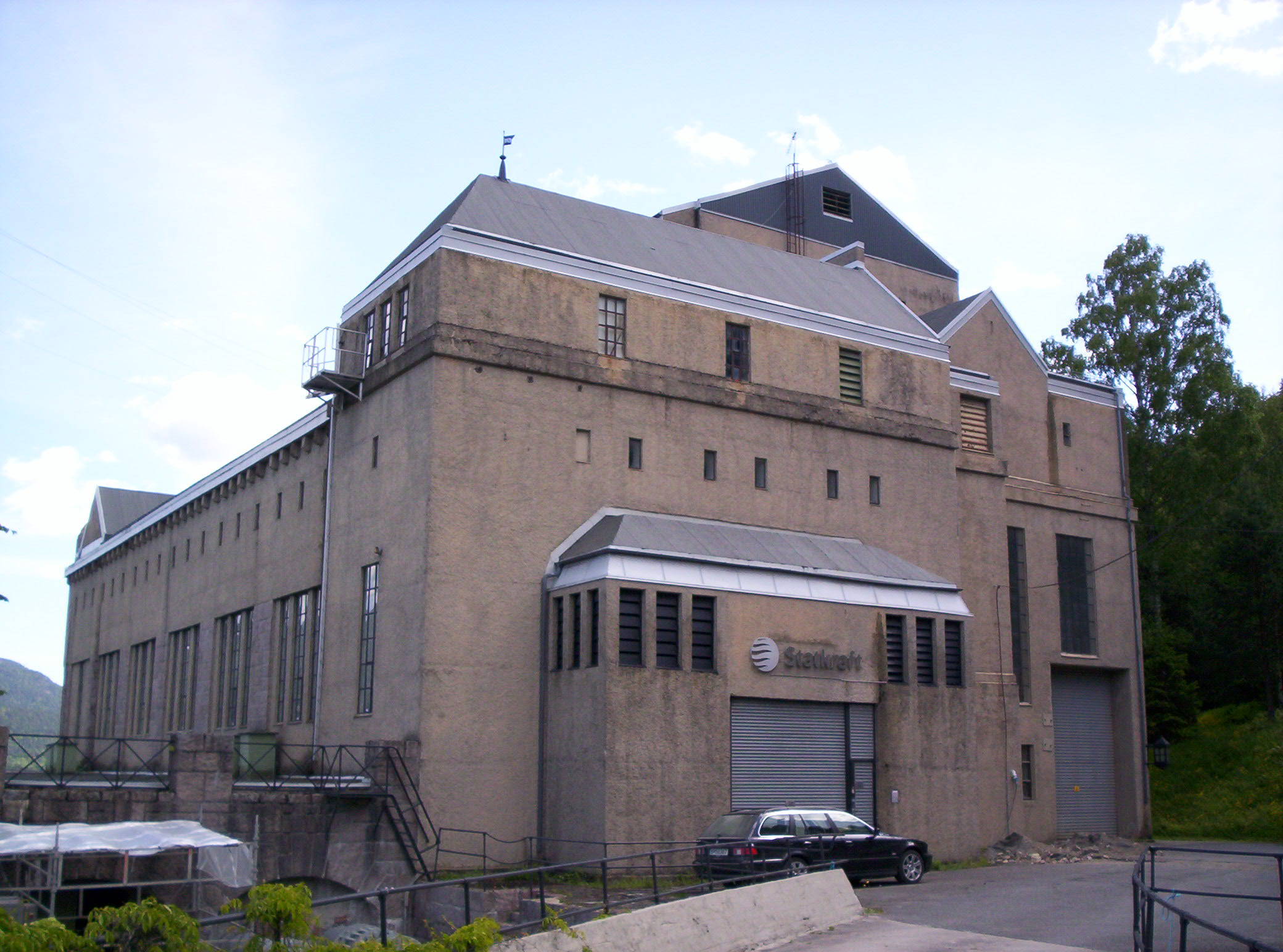
- Hakavik Power Station
- Interactive map of Hakavik Power Station
- Official name: Hakavik kraftverk
- Country: Norway
- Coordinates: 59°37′29″N 9°57′13″E
- Status: Operational
- Opening date: 1922; 104 years ago

Power Station
- Hydraulic head: 389 metres (1,276 ft)
- Turbines: 2 × 3.5 MW
- Installed capacity: 7 MW
- Capacity factor: 34.2%
- Annual generation: 21 GW·h

Hakavik Power Station is a 7-megawatt (9,400 hp) hydroelectric power plant in Øvre Eiker Municipality in Buskerud county, Norway. The power station is located at an elevation of 25 metres (82 ft) above sea level.

The power station was inaugurated in 1922. It generates only railway traction current, single phase 55 kV at 16 2/3 hertz. The station is the starting point of a powerline to Sande and another to Sundhaugen Switching Station, where a 55 kV-line to Asker and another one to Neslandsvatn over Nordagutu and Skollenberg departs. The only other power station in Norway to do this is Kjofossen Power Station.

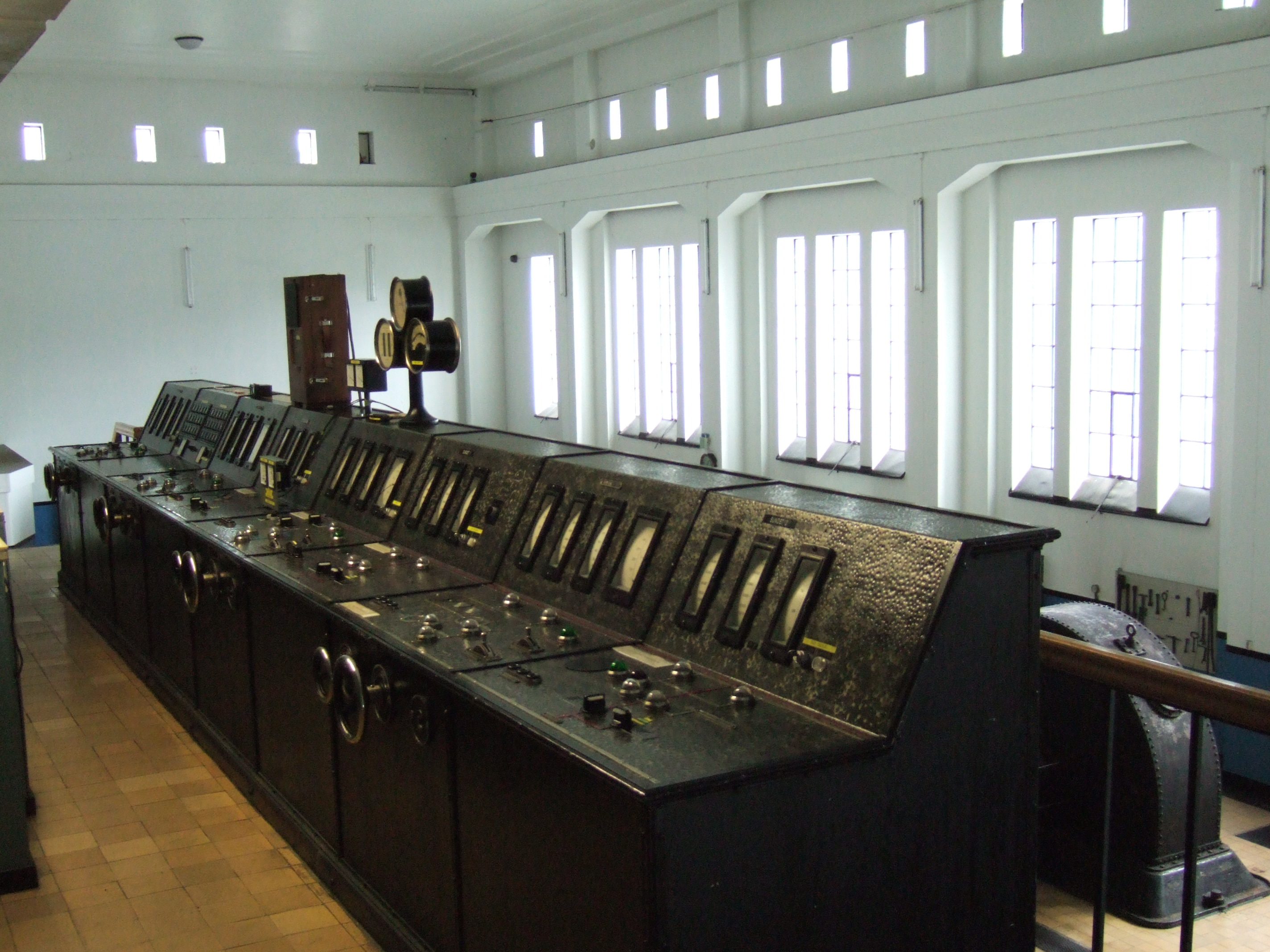
Instruments control room

== See also ==
- Kjofossen Power Station
