= 25 Hz Power Transmission System =

25 Hz Power Transmission System may refer to:

- Amtrak's 25 Hz traction power system
- SEPTA's 25 Hz traction power system
