= 2022 New Hampshire House of Representatives election in Sullivan County =

- November 8, 2022

All 13 seats representing Sullivan County in the New Hampshire House of Representatives
	Majority party	Minority party
Party	Republican	Democratic
Last election	6 seats	7 seats
Seats before	6	7
Seats after	7	6
Seat change	▲1	▼1

For 2022 New Hampshire House of Representatives election in Sullivan County, all 13 out of 400 seats representing Sullivan County in New Hampshire House of Representatives were up for election.

== Detailed results ==
- Source for Republican primary results, Sullivan County:
- Source for Democratic primary results, Sullivan County:
- Reference for general election results, Sullivan County:

=== Sullivan 1 ===
- Elects one representative

Republican primary

Sullivan 1 Republican primary
Party	Candidate	Votes	%
Republican	Tanya McIntire	239	98.0
Write-in	Write-ins	5	2.0
Total votes		244	100.0

Democratic primary

Sullivan 1 Democratic primary
Party	Candidate	Votes	%
Democratic	Brian Sullivan (incumbent)	490	100.0
Total votes		490	100.0

General election

Sullivan 1 general election, 2022
Party	Candidate	Votes	%
Democratic	Brian Sullivan (incumbent)	1,417	68.62
Republican	Tanya McIntire	647	31.33
Write-in	Write-ins	1	0.05
Total votes		2,065	100.0

=== Sullivan 2 ===
- Elects one representative

Democratic primary

Sullivan 2 Democratic primary
Party	Candidate	Votes	%
Democratic	William Palmer	626	99.7
Write-in	Write-ins	2	0.3
Total votes		628	100.0

Republican primary

Sullivan 2 Republican primary
Party	Candidate	Votes	%
Republican	Virginia Drye	351	99.4
Write-in	Write-ins	2	0.6
Total votes		353	100.0

General election

Sullivan 2 general election, 2022
Party	Candidate	Votes	%
Democratic	William Palmer	1,380	60.42
Republican	Virginia Drye	903	39.54
Write-in	Write-ins	1	0.04
Total votes		2,284	100.0

=== Sullivan 3 ===
- Elects three representatives

Republican primary

Sullivan 3 Republican primary
Party	Candidate	Votes	%
Republican	Skip Rollins (incumbent)	771	34.67
Republican	Steven Smith (incumbent)	713	32.06
Republican	Walter Spilsbury (incumbent)	433	19.47
Republican	Tobin Menard	296	13.31
Write-in	Misc. Write-ins	9	0.40
Democratic	Virginia Irwin (write-in)	2	0.09
Total votes		2,224	100.0

Democratic primary

Sullivan 3 Democratic primary
Party	Candidate	Votes	%
Democratic	Virginia Irwin	489	38.7
Democratic	John Streeter	395	31.3
Democratic	Linda Wadensten	358	28.3
Write-in	Write-ins	21	1.7
Total votes		1,263	100.0

General election

Sullivan 3 general election, 2022
Party	Candidate	Votes	%
Republican	Skip Rollins (incumbent)	2,684	21.59
Republican	Steven Smith (incumbent)	2,532	20.37
Republican	Walter Spilsbury (incumbent)	2,199	17.69
Democratic	Virginia Irwin	1,874	15.07
Democratic	John Streeter	1,628	13.10
Democratic	Linda Wadensten	1,512	12.16
Write-in	Write-ins	3	0.02
Total votes		12,432	100.0

=== Sullivan 4 ===
- Elects one representative

Republican primary

Sullivan 4 Republican primary
Party	Candidate	Votes	%
Republican	Judy Aron (incumbent)	515	99.8
Democratic	Bruce Cragin (write-in)	1	0.2
Total votes		516	100.0

Democratic primary

Sullivan 4 Democratic primary
Party	Candidate	Votes	%
Democratic	Bruce Cragin	283	99.6
Write-in	Write-ins	1	0.4
Total votes		284	100.0

General election

Sullivan 4 general election, 2022
Party	Candidate	Votes	%
Republican	Judy Aron (incumbent)	1,483	62.3
Democratic	Bruce Cragin	894	37.6
Write-in	Write-ins	3	0.1
Total votes		2,380	100.0

=== Sullivan 5 ===
- Elects one representative

Republican primary

Sullivan 5 Republican primary
Party	Candidate	Votes	%
Republican	George Grant	578	98.8
Democratic	Linda Tanner (incumbent) (write-in)	6	1.0
Write-in	Misc. Write-ins	1	0.2
Total votes		2,380	100.0

Democratic primary

Sullivan 5 Democratic primary
Party	Candidate	Votes	%
Democratic	Linda Tanner (incumbent)	442	99.8
Write-in	Misc. Write-ins	1	0.2
Total votes		443	100.0

General election

Sullivan 5 general election, 2022 (post recount)
Party	Candidate	Votes	%
Democratic	Linda Tanner (incumbent)	1,397	50.6
Republican	George Grant	1,366	49.4
Total votes		2,763	100.0

The preliminary count originally had Linda Tanner getting 1392 votes and George Grant getting 1362 votes.

=== Sullivan 6 ===
- Elects three representatives

Republican primary

Sullivan 6 Republican primary
Party	Candidate	Votes	%
Republican	Walter Stapleton (incumbent)	615	37.1
Republican	Jeremy Herrell	522	31.5
Republican	Sean McCarthy	513	30.9
Write-in	Misc. Write-ins	6	0.4
Democratic	John Cloutier (incumbent) (write-in)	2	0.1
Total votes		1,658	100.0

Democratic primary

Sullivan 6 Democratic primary
Party	Candidate	Votes	%
Democratic	John Cloutier (incumbent)	633	37.1
Democratic	Gary Merchant (incumbent)	565	33.2
Democratic	Andrew O'Hearne (incumbent)	501	29.4
Write-in	Write-ins	5	0.3
Total votes		1,704	100.0

General election

Sullivan 6 general election, 2022 (preliminary count)
Party	Candidate	Votes	%
Democratic	John Cloutier (incumbent)	2,240	18.13
Democratic	Gary Merchant (incumbent)	2,108	17.06
Republican	Walter Stapleton (incumbent)	2,081	16.84
Democratic	Andrew O'Hearne (incumbent)	2,032	16.45
Republican	Sean McCarthy	1,954	15.82
Republican	Jeremy Herrell	1,939	15.69
Write-in	Write-ins	1	0.01
Total votes		12,355	100.0

Sullivan 6 general election, 2022 (post recount)
Party	Candidate	Votes	%
Democratic	John Cloutier (incumbent)	2,243	18.14
Democratic	Gary Merchant (incumbent)	2,110	17.06
Republican	Walter Stapleton (incumbent)	2,083	16.85
Democratic	Andrew O'Hearne (incumbent)	2,036	16.47
Republican	Sean McCarthy	1,957	15.83
Republican	Jeremy Herrell	1,936	15.66
Total votes		12,365	100.0

=== Sullivan 7 ===
- Elects one representative

Republican primary

Sullivan 7 Republican primary
Party	Candidate	Votes	%
Republican	Margaret Drye	1,288	99.0
Write-in	Misc. Write-ins	8	0.6
Democratic	Larry Flint (write-in)	5	0.4
Total votes		1,301	100.0

Democratic primary

Sullivan 7 Democratic primary
Party	Candidate	Votes	%
Democratic	Jason Bourne	992	76.6
Democratic	Larry Flint	295	22.8
Write-in	Write-ins	8	0.6
Total votes		1,295	100.0

General election

Sullivan 7 general election, 2022
Party	Candidate	Votes	%
Republican	Margaret Drye	3,603	51.1
Democratic	Jason Bourne	3,438	48.8
Write-in	Write-ins	4	0.1
Total votes		7,045	100.0

=== Sullivan 8 ===
- Elects two representatives

Republican primary

Sullivan 8 Republican primary
Party	Candidate	Votes	%
Republican	Jonathan Stone	1,394	51.1
Republican	Don Bettencourt	1,309	47.9
Write-in	Misc. Write-ins	13	0.5
Democratic	Hope Damon (write-in)	9	0.3
Democratic	Robert Lovett Jr. (write-in)	5	0.2
Total votes		2,730	100.0

Democratic primary

Sullivan 8 Democratic primary
Party	Candidate	Votes	%
Democratic	Hope Damon	1,244	57.3
Democratic	Robert Lovett Jr.	925	42.6
Republican	Jonathan Stone (write-in)	3	0.1
Total votes		2,172	100.0

General election

Sullivan 8 general election, 2022 (preliminary count)
Party	Candidate	Votes	%
Democratic	Hope Damon	4,454	25.44
Republican	Jonathan Stone	4,436	25.34
Republican	Don Bettencourt	4,433	25.32
Democratic	Robert Lovett Jr.	4,179	23.87
Write-in	Write-ins	6	0.03
Total votes		17,508	100.0

Sullivan 8 general election, 2022 (post recount)
Party	Candidate	Votes	%
Democratic	Hope Damon	4,466	25.45
Republican	Jonathan Stone	4,457	25.40
Republican	Don Bettencourt	4,443	25.32
Democratic	Robert Lovett Jr.	4,179	23.82
Total votes		17,545	100.0
