= John O'Connor =

John O'Connor may refer to:

== Clergy ==
- John O'Connor (Archdeacon of Emly) (fl. 1854–1904), Archdeacon of Emly, 1880–1904
- John J. O'Connor (bishop of Newark) (1855–1927), Roman Catholic Bishop of Newark
- John O'Connor (priest) (1870–1952), British Roman Catholic priest, model for the fictional detective Father Brown
- John O'Connor (cardinal) (1920–2000), Roman Catholic Archbishop of New York

== Politicians ==
- John O'Connor (Australian politician) (1878–1937), Australian politician from South Australia
- John O'Connor (Canadian politician) (1824–1887), Canadian politician from Ontario
- John O'Connor (Irish Parliamentary Party politician) (c. 1835–1891), Lord Mayor of Dublin and MP for South Kerry
- John O'Connor (North Kildare MP) (1850–1928), Irish politician
- John J. O'Connor (congressman) (1885–1960), American politician from New York
- John J. O'Connor (New Hampshire politician), American politician from New Hampshire
- John J. O'Connor (New York state legislator) (1855–1898), American politician from New York
- John M. O'Connor (born 1954), American politician from Oklahoma
- John S. O'Connor (1896–1967), Irish politician
- John T. O'Connor, American politician from New Hampshire

== Sportspeople ==
- John O'Connor (English cricketer) (1867–1936)
- John O'Connor (Australian cricketer) (1868–1952)
- John O'Connor (Cork hurler) (fl. 1890s)
- John O'Connor (triple jumper) (1893–1977), Irish Olympic athlete
- John C. O'Connor (1878–1922), American college football coach
- Johnny O'Connor (baseball) (1891–1982), Major League Baseball player
- Johnny O'Connor (hurler) (1928–2010), Irish hurler who played for Waterford
- John O'Connor (Wexford hurler) (born 1965), Irish hurler who played for Wexford
- Johnny O'Connor (born 1980), Irish rugby union player

== Others ==
- John O'Connor (musician) (born 1949), British guitarist, television composer and recording artist
- John O'Connor (painter) (1830–1889), Irish painter
- John Carroll O'Connor, full name of American actor Carroll O'Connor (1924–2001)
- John Jay O'Connor (1930–2009), American lawyer and husband of United States Supreme Court Justice Sandra Day O'Connor
- John J. O'Connor (artist) (born 1972), American artist
- John J. O'Connor (historian) (1904–1978), American historian and sociologist
- John J. O'Connor (journalist) (1933–2009), American journalist and critic
- John J. O'Connor (mathematician) (fl. 1990s–2010s), owner of MacTutor History of Mathematics archive
- John Kennedy O'Connor (born 1964), television and radio broadcaster

== See also ==
- John Conner (disambiguation)
- John Connor (disambiguation)
- Jack O'Connor (disambiguation)
- John O'Conor (born 1947), Irish pianist
- John O'Conor (rugby union), Irish international rugby union player
- Jon O'Connor (born 1976), English footballer
- John O'Connor Power (1846–1919), Irish politician
- "He'd Have to Get Under – Get Out and Get Under (to Fix Up His Automobile)", a song also known as "Johnny O'Connor"
