= Irish Rugby Football Union =

Governing body for rugby union on the island of Ireland

- Sport: Rugby union
- Founded: 1879; 147 years ago
- World Rugby affiliation: 1886 (founder)
- Rugby Europe affiliation: 1999
- President: John O'Driscoll (2025–2026)
- Men's coach: Andy Farrell (2019–)
- Women's coach: Scott Bemand (2023–)
- Sevens coach: James Topping
- Website: www.irishrugby.ie

The Irish Rugby Football Union (IRFU) is the body managing rugby union in the island of Ireland (both Republic of Ireland and Northern Ireland). The IRFU has its head office at 10/12 Lansdowne Road and home ground at Aviva Stadium, where adult men's Irish rugby union international matches are played. In addition, the Union also owns the Ravenhill Stadium in Belfast, Thomond Park in Limerick and a number of grounds in provincial areas that have been rented to clubs.

== History ==
Initially, there were two unions: the Irish Football Union, which had jurisdiction over clubs in Leinster, Munster and parts of Ulster and was founded in December 1874, and the Northern Football Union of Ireland, which controlled the Belfast area and was founded in January 1875. The IRFU was formed in 1879 as an amalgamation of these two organisations and branches of the new IRFU were formed in Leinster, Munster and Ulster. The Connacht Branch was formed in 1885.

The IRFU was a founding member of the International Rugby Football Board, now known as World Rugby, in 1886 with Scotland and Wales, with the Rugby Football Union not joining until 1890.

Following the partition of Ireland in to what is now the Republic of Ireland (an independent country) and Northern Ireland (a region of the United Kingdom), the then Committee of the Irish Rugby Football Union decided that it would continue to administer its affairs on the basis of the full 32 Irish counties and the traditional four provinces of Ireland: Leinster (12 counties), Ulster (9 counties), Munster (6 counties), and Connacht (5 counties), as they had been whilst all in the United Kingdom.

This led to the unusual, but not unique, situation among international rugby union teams, where the Irish representative teams are drawn from players from two separate political, national territories: Ireland (an independent, sovereign state) and Northern Ireland (a part of the United Kingdom). To maintain the unity of Irish rugby union and the linkages between North and South, the IRFU purchased a new ground in 1923 in the Ravenhill district of Belfast at a cost of £2,300. The last full International at Ravenhill involving Ireland for more than a half-century took place in 1953–54 against Scotland who were victorious by 2 tries (6 points) to nil. Australia played Romania in the 1999 World Cup at the ground. The next full International played at Ravenhill was the Rugby World Cup warm-up match against Italy in August 2007 due to the temporary closure of Lansdowne Road for reconstruction.

The four provincial branches of the IRFU first ran cup competitions during the 1880s. Although these tournaments still take place every year, their significance has been diminished by the advent of an All-Ireland league of 48 Senior Clubs in 1990.

The four provincial teams have played an Interprovincial Championship since the 1920s and the teams organised by the four provincial branches of the IRFU continue to be the focal point for players aspiring to the international level. Since rugby union turned professional, the 'representative' senior teams of each of the branches - Munster, Leinster, Ulster and Connacht - have functioned as professional clubs part funded by the IRFU, and as such now routinely sign players not born in the respective province while remaining the primary outlet for players developed in that province. All four provinces play at the senior level as members of the United Rugby Championship and in competitions organised by European Professional Club Rugby.

The IRFU, through its provinces, also administer women's rugby on island, and the provincial teams take part in the IRFU Women's Interprovincial Series, the highest level of purely domestic women's rugby. In 2023, two IRFU funded combined provinces teams, Wolfhounds (Leinster and Ulster) and Clovers (Munster and Connacht) were entered in the cross-border Celtic Challenge.

== Logos and emblems ==
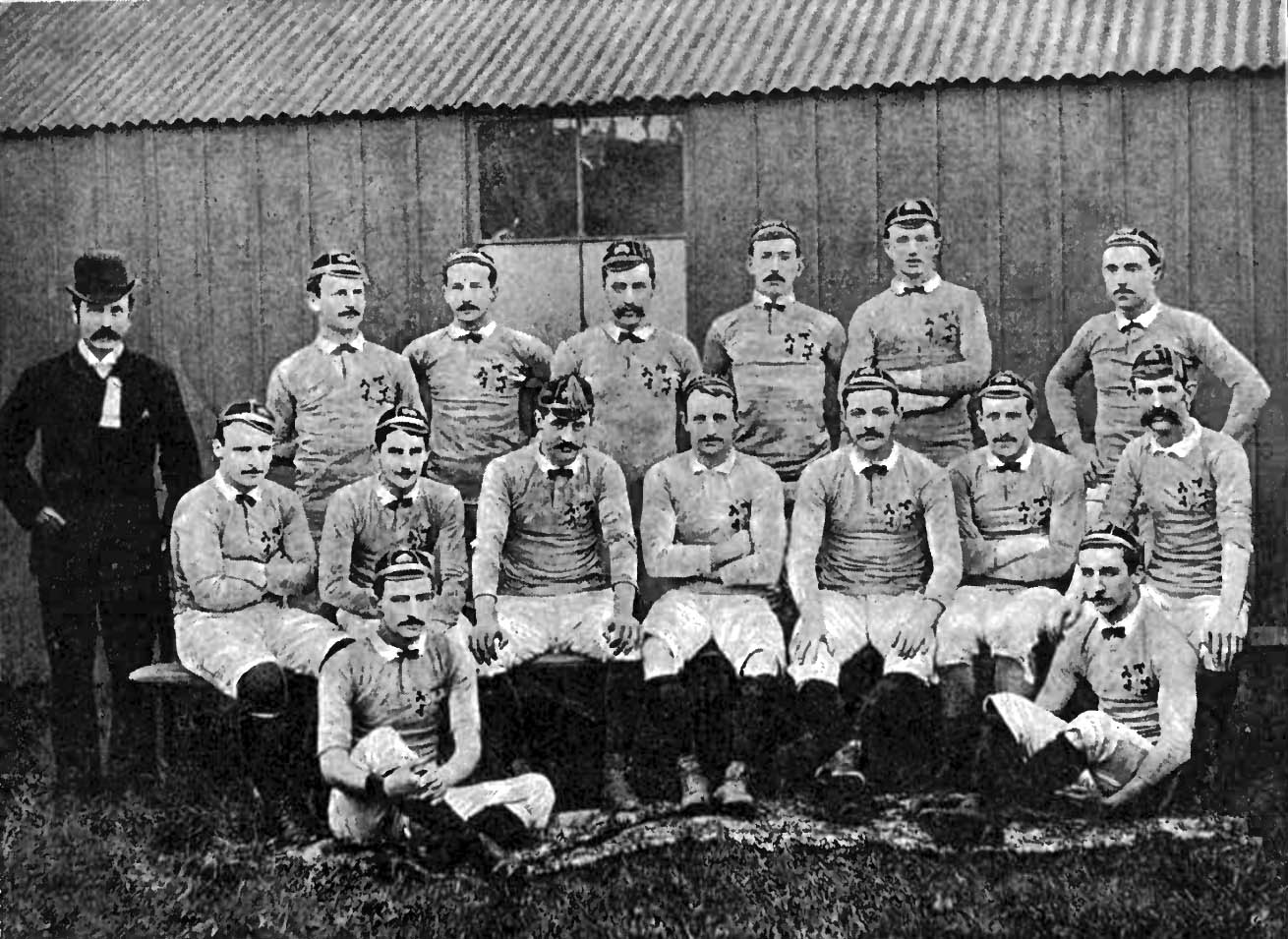
The 1887 Ireland side sporting the 5 sprig shamrock

The Irish Rugby Football Union represents the island of Ireland and the emblems and symbols it uses have reflected its association with the whole of the island of Ireland since its formation. Some elements have changed since 1874, but what has remained consistent throughout the history of the union is the use of the shamrock in its emblems. Originally the Shamrock was a five-sprig emblem covering most of the lefthand side of the jersey and this was used until the 1898 game against England in when it was replaced with a white shield with a sprig of four similar sized shamrocks.

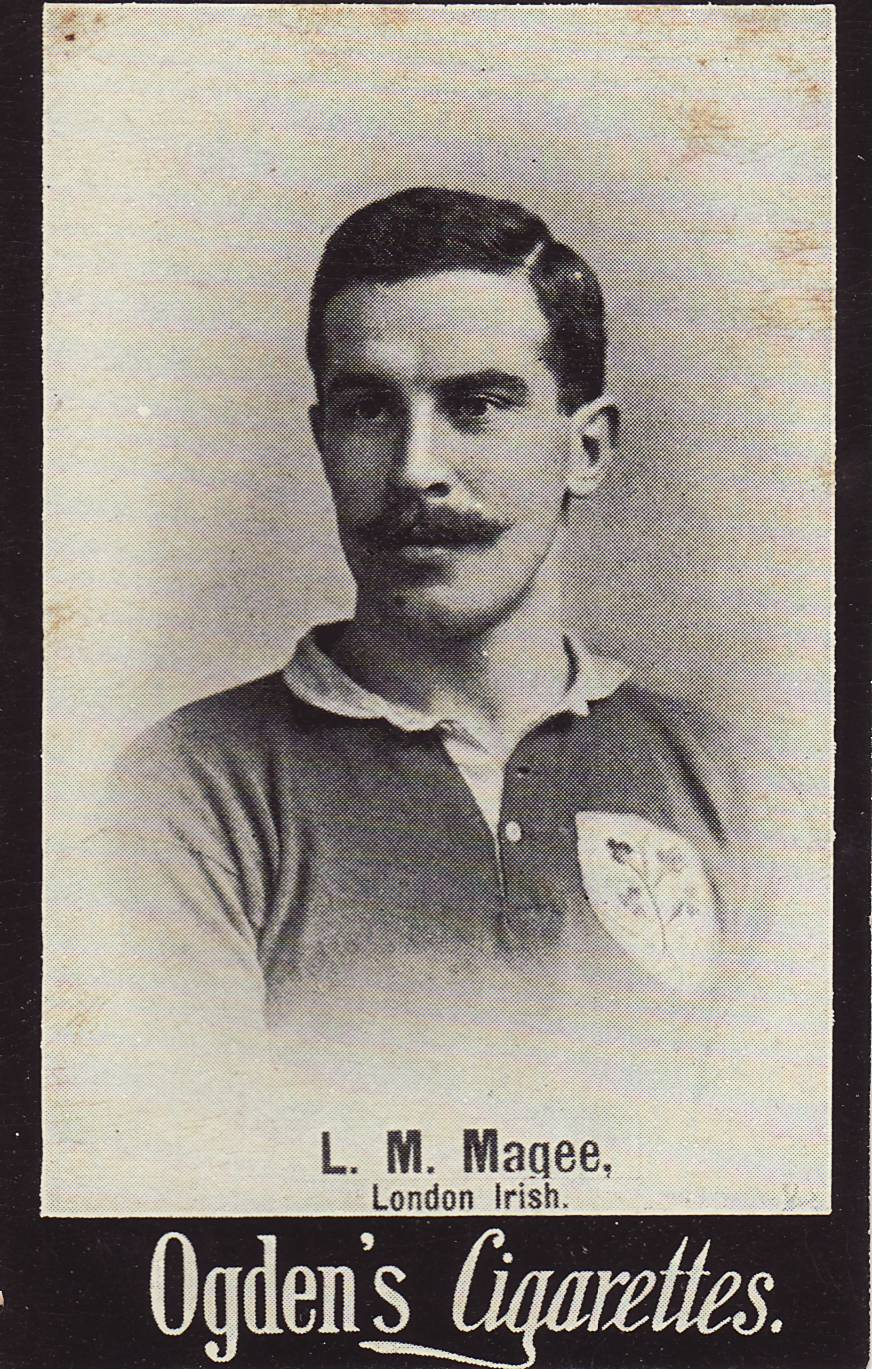
Louis Magee and the four-sprig shamrock on his chest, as depicted in an Ogden's cigarette card

In 1927 a new crest was introduced, with the shamrock design altered to a sprig of three shamrocks of a similar size within a smaller white shield. This was the official crest until 1974 when the centenary logo was used, and which continued to be used with only a slight modification made in 2010.

Logos used on the official match programmes from the 1920s to 1954, showing a single shamrock surrounded by an oval had no relation to the official jersey emblem. The only time an Irish jersey had a single shamrock was when the Ireland side toured Chile and Argentina in 1952 and Argentina in 1970, and in both series no caps were awarded.

Although the use of the shamrock has been a constant, albeit with modifications to design, other elements of symbology have changed. In the early twenties, when the Irish Free State was established, the union was left in the position of governing a game for one island containing two separate political entities. A controversy ensued as to what flag should be flown at international matches. For a side that played both in Dublin and Belfast (the former being in the Free State, the latter being politically part of the United Kingdom) this posed a significant issue.

Flag of the IRFU displaying the coats of arms of the four provinces of Ireland

In 1925 the union designed their own flag, incorporating the arms of the four provinces. Although it had the same elements as the Flag of the Four Provinces, it was not identical, instead having them separated on a green background with the IRFU logo in the centre. Even so, the call to fly the Irish tricolour at Lansdowne Road continued. In 1932, despite the IRFU insisting that only the IRFU flag was flown at home internationals, pressure continued such that the Minister for External Affairs in the Free State asked to meet with the president of the Union. The result was that on 5 February 1932, the IRFU unanimously voted to fly both the flag of the union and the national flag at Lansdowne Road at all international matches in Dublin. The IRFU flag, as designed in 1925, is that which is still used by the Ireland rugby union side, albeit with the logo updated in the middle.

At the 2011 Rugby World Cup, the Ireland team entered the field of play at the beginning of their matches with the Irish tricolour and the Flag of Ulster.

Similar to the flag and logo compromise, since The Rugby World Cup in 1995, the Irish rugby team has sung both the Irish national anthem "Amhrán na bhFiann" and "Ireland's Call" when playing in the Republic of Ireland, and only Ireland's call when playing elsewhere.

== Affiliation ==
There are currently approximately 95,000 rugby players in total in Ireland. There are 56 clubs affiliated to the Ulster Branch; 71 to the Leinster Branch; 59 to the Munster Branch and 23 to the Connacht Branch. In addition, there are 246 schools playing rugby: Ulster (107), Leinster (75), Munster (41) and Connacht (23).

The IRFU also has an Exiles branch tasked with developing "Ireland-qualified" players (i.e., eligible to play internationally for Ireland as members of the Irish diaspora) living in England, Scotland and Wales. Volunteers provide coaching, administration and development under the supervision of a paid development manager.

== IRFU presidents ==
- 1874–1876: Duke of Abercorn
- 1876–1879: Duke of Marlborough
- 1879–1880: W.C. Neville
- 188018–81: W. Goulding
- 1881–1882: R.B. Walkington
- 1883–1884: A.R. McMullen
- 1884–1885: R.E. McLean
- 1885–1886: G. Scriven
- 1886–1887: W.L. Stokes
- 1887–1888: J. Chambers
- 1888–1889: R. Biggs
- 1889–1890: F.W. Moore
- 1890–1891: M.H. Turnbull
- 1891–1892: H. Hook
- 1892–1893: J.R. Blood
- 1893–1894: R. Garratt
- 1894–1895: J. Macaulay
- 1895–1896: R.G. Warren
- 1896–1897: J. Dodds
- 1897–1898: J.F. Maguire
- 1898–1899: J.B. Moore
- 1899–1900: S. Lee
- 1900–1901: J. O'Sullivan
- 1901–1902: T. Thornhill
- 1902–1903: J. Johnston
- 1903–1904: V.J. Murray
- 1904–1905: A.D. Clinch
- 1905–1906: F.M. Hamilton
- 1906–1907: J. Flynn
- 1907–1908: G.H.B. Kennedy
- 1908–1909: A. Barr
- 1909–1910: C.W.L. Alexander
- 1910–1911: F.C. Purser
- 1911–1912: J.H. O'Conor
- 1912–1913: R. Stevenson
- 1913–1916: F.H. Browning
- 1919–1920: A. Tedford
- 1920–1921: W.P. Hinton
- 1921–1922: R.M. Magrath
- 1922–1923: G.G. McCrea
- 1923–1924: H. Thrift
- 1924–1925: J.J. Coffey
- 1925–1926: F.J. Strain
- 1926–1927: G.T. Hamlet
- 1927–1928: J. Sealy
- 1928–1929: H.J. Millar
- 1929–1930: T.J. Greeves
- 1930–1931: J.G. Musgrave
- 1931–1932: W.A. Clarke
- 1932–1933: C.S. Neill
- 1933–1934: S.E. Polden
- 1934–1935: J. Wallace
- 1935–1936: S.T. Irwin
- 1936–1937: C. Davitt
- 1937–1938: H.E. Emerson
- 1938–1945: J.J. Warren
- 1945–1946: H.J. Anderson
- 1946–1947: W.A.B. Douglas
- 1947–1948: T.M. McGrath
- 1948–1949: G.P.S. Hogan
- 1949–1950: W.G. Fallon
- 1950–1951: Air Vice-Marshall Sir W. Tyrrell, K.B.E., D.S.O., M.C., M.B., LL.D.
- 1951–1952: D. F. O'Connell
- 1952–1953: V. E. Kirwan
- 1953–1954: J. B. O'Callaghan
- 1954–1955: C. J. Hanrahan
- 1955–1956: H. M. Read
- 1956–1957: Capt. J. R. Ramsey, P.C.
- 1957–1958: W. E. Crawford, B.L.
- 1958–1959: Johnny J Glynn
- 1960–1961: N.F. Murphy
- 1961–1962: L.B. McMahon
- 1962–1963: J.A.E. Siggins
- 1963–1964: T.A. O'Reilly
- 1964–1965: C.C. Harte
- 1965–1966: P.F. Murray
- 1966–1967: D.G. O'Donovan
- 1967–1968: E. O'Davy
- 1968–1969: C.P. Crowley
- 1969–1970: J.W.S. Irwin
- 1970–1971: E. Patterson
- 1971–1972: D.A. Dineen
- 1972–1973: J.C. Conroy
- 1973–1974: I.F. Mahony
- 1974–1975: H.R. McKibbin
- 1975–1976: J.J. Keane
- 1976–1977: J.A.D. Higgins
- 1977–1978: J.F. Coffey
- 1978–1979: K.J. Quilligan
- 1979–1980: J. Montgomery
- 1980–1981: R. Ganly
- 1981–1982: J.J. Moore
- 1982–1983: J.E. Nelson
- 1983–1984: G.F. Reidy
- 1984–1985: M.H. Carroll
- 1985–1986: D. McKibbin
- 1986–1987: E. Bell
- 1987–1988: P.F. Madigan
- 1988–1989: T.J. Kiernan
- 1989–1990: A.R. Dawson
- 1990–1991: N.J. Henderson
- 1991–1992: A.D. Browne
- 1992–1993: C.A. Quaid
- 1993–1994: M. Cuddy
- 1994–1995: K.E. Reid
- 1995–1996: S. Millar
- 1996–1997: R.M. Deacu
- 1997–1998: N.H Brophy
- 1998–1999: N.A.A. Murphy
- 1999–2000: W.S.H. Lavery
- 2000–2001: E. Coleman
- 2001–2002: R. Loughead
- 2002–2003: D.M. Crowley
- 2003–2004: J.K. Quilligan
- 2004–2005: B.T. Keogh
- 2005–2006: D.A. Crawford
- 2006–2007: P.J. Boyle
- 2007–2008: D.V. Healy
- 2008–2009: J. Lyons
- 2009–2010: J.R. Callaghan
- 2010–2011: Caleb Powell
- 2011–2012: John D. Hussey
- 2012–2013: William B. Glynn
- 2013–2014: Pat Fitzgerald
- 2014–2015: Louis Magee
- 2015–2016: Martin O'Sullivan
- 2016–2017: Stephen Hilditch
- 2017–2018: Philip Orr
- 2018–2019: Ian McIlrath
- 2019–2020: Nicholas Comyn
- 2020–2022: Des Kavanagh (Note: The President and Vice-Presidents served two seasons because of the COVID-19 pandemic.)
- 2022–2023: John Robinson
- 2023–2024: Greg Barrett
- 2024–2025: Declan Madden
- 2025–2026: John O'Driscoll

== National teams ==
- Ireland national rugby union team
- Ireland national rugby sevens team
- Ireland women's national rugby union team
- Ireland women's national rugby sevens team
- Ireland Wolfhounds
- Emerging Ireland
- Ireland national under-20 rugby union team
- Ireland national schoolboy rugby union team

== See also ==
- Rugby Players Ireland
- Connacht Rugby
- Leinster Rugby
- Munster Rugby
- Ulster Rugby
- Wolfhounds, IRFU funded senior women's team representing Leinster and Ulster.
- Clovers, IRFU funded senior women's team representing Munster and Connacht.
- Irish Universities Rugby Union
