= Jack O'Connor =

Jack O'Connor may refer to:

== Sportspeople ==
- Jack O'Connor (Australian footballer) (1900–1983), Australian footballer
- Jack O'Connor (Canadian football), Canadian football player and coach
- Jack O'Connor (Gaelic footballer) (born 1960), former Kerry player and manager
- Jack O'Connor (rugby union) (1906–1980), rugby union player who represented Australia

=== Baseball ===
- Jack O'Connor (catcher) (1866–1937), baseball catcher and manager
- Jack O'Connor (pitcher) (born 1958), baseball pitcher

=== Cricket ===
- Jack O'Connor (Australian cricketer) (1875–1941), Australian cricketer
- Jack O'Connor (English cricketer) (1897–1977), English cricketer

=== Hurling ===
- Jack O'Connor (Cork hurler) (born 1998), Irish hurler
- Jack O'Connor (Wexford hurler) (born 1995), Irish hurler

== Other people ==
- Jack O'Connor (trade unionist) (born 1957), Irish trade union leader
- Jack O'Connor (writer) (1902–1978), American author and outdoorsman

== See also ==
- John O'Connor (disambiguation)
- Jack Connor (disambiguation)
- Connor (surname)
