= Jack Connors =

Jack Connors may refer to:

- Jack Connors (footballer, born 1927) (1927–2006), English football wing half for Darlington
- Jack Connors (footballer, born 1994), football defender for Dagenham & Redbridge and Ireland under-21
- Jack Connors (businessman), founder of Hill Holliday and philanthropist from Boston, MA

== See also ==
- John Connors (1830–1857), Victoria Cross recipient
- John Connor (disambiguation)
- Jack Connor (disambiguation)
