= William Hinton =

William Hinton may refer to:

- Bill Hinton (William Frederick Weston Hinton, 1895–1976), British professional footballer
- William A. Hinton (politician) (1862–1920), Minnesota politician
- William Augustus Hinton (1883–1959), American bacteriologist, pathologist, and educator
- William H. Hinton (1919–2004), American Marxist, farmer, and writer
- Billy Hinton (1882–1953), Irish international rugby union player
