= List of The Jay Leno Show episodes =

This is a list of episodes for The Jay Leno Show airing from September 14, 2009, to February 9, 2010.

== 2009 ==
=== September ===
No.	Original release date	Guest(s)	Musical/entertainment guest(s)
1	September 14, 2009	Jerry Seinfeld, Kanye West	Jay-Z, Kanye West, Rihanna
Headlines
2	September 15, 2009	Michael Moore	Tom Cruise and Cameron Diaz in 10@10
Uninvited Guest, Getting Ready For 10 - Jim Norton
3	September 16, 2009	Robin Williams	Hamish & Andy, Miley Cyrus in 10@10
Back To School
4	September 17, 2009	Halle Berry	Bruce Hornsby, Eric Clapton, D.L. Hughley, Tom Papa
D.L. in D.C., Dealing With The Public
5	September 18, 2009	Drew Barrymore	Rachael Harris, Mel Gibson in 10@10
Jaywalking, Green Car Challenge - Drew Barrymore
6	September 21, 2009	Jennifer Garner	Barney Frank in 10@10
Brian Unger Investigates, Ghosting, Headlines
7	September 22, 2009	Pee-wee Herman	Amy Poehler in 10@10
Funny Items at the $.99 store
8	September 23, 2009	Vince Vaughn	Al Michaels, Bob Costas, Jaywalking
Leno's JMZ, Green Car Challenge - Al Michaels & Bob Costas, Jaywalking
9	September 24, 2009	Rush Limbaugh	Smokey Robinson, Joss Stone
Green Car Challenge - Rush Limbaugh
10	September 25, 2009	Hugh Laurie	LeBron James in 10@10
Internet Success & Failure
11	September 28, 2009	Bill Maher	Brad Paisley, Sheryl Crow
Headlines
12	September 29, 2009	Julia Louis-Dreyfus	Billy Crystal in 10@10
Battle Of The Jaywalk All-Stars
13	September 30, 2009	Steve Carell	Vince Gill, Emmylou Harris
Jackass Of The Month, Green Car Challenge - Steve Carell

=== October ===
No.	Original release date	Guest(s)	Musical/entertainment guest(s)
14	October 1, 2009	Chris Rock	Chris Matthews in 10@10
Senior Twitter
15	October 2, 2009	Jenna Fischer	Dan Ahdoot
Who Cares What They Think
16	October 5, 2009	Jamie Foxx	Joe Torre in 10@10
Brian Unger - Arlington, Texas, Headlines
17	October 6, 2009	Abigail Breslin	Tim Allen
The Dan Band - Dentist Disco, Green Car Challenge - Tim Allen, Jaywalking
18	October 7, 2009	Wanda Sykes	Kathleen Sebelius in 10@10
Leno's JMZ, Craigslist Ads
19	October 8, 2009	Gerard Butler	Ben Harper, Jack Black
Jim Norton Uninvited Guest
20	October 9, 2009	Terry Bradshaw	Ashlee Simpson-Wentz in 10@10, Arsenio Hall
Arsenio Hall Goes To Compton
21	October 12, 2009	Dana Carvey	Justin Timberlake in 10@10
Headlines
22	October 13, 2009	John C. Reilly	Ben Roethlisberger in 10@10
Girltalk in Harlem, Getting Ready At 10
23	October 14, 2009	Bill Cosby	Toby Keith in 10@10
Other Shows Pitched To Jay, Leno's JMZ
24	October 15, 2009	Matt Lauer	D.L. Hughley in D.L. in D.C., Jeff Dunham, Ross Mathews
Green Car Challenge - Matt Lauer, Meal or No Meal
25	October 16, 2009	Rachael Griffiths	John McCain in 10@10
JChat, America's Next Average Model
26	October 19, 2009	Rod Stewart	Serena Williams
Owen Benjamin Writes Your Jingle, Green Car Challenge - Serena Williams, Headlines
27	October 20, 2009	Martha Stewart	Ludacris in 10@10
Jaywalking, Leno's JMZ
28	October 21, 2009	Rainn Wilson	Malin Åkerman
Gina Yashere Surly Psychic, Green Car Challenge - Malin Akerman, Who Cares What They Think
29	October 22, 2009	Hilary Swank	Jerry Jones in 9@9
Don't Try This At Home, Nick Thune Changes Your Life
30	October 23, 2009	Colin Firth	Michelle Obama in 10@10
Frightened and Fabulous, What They Said, What They Meant
31	October 26, 2009	Dr. Phil McGraw	Jimmy Rollins in 10@10
Green Car Challenge - Dr. Phil McGraw, Headlines
32	October 27, 2009	Ewan McGregor	Tim McGraw, Gregg Allman
Green Car Challenge - Ewan McGregor, JMZ - Cesar Millan, Audience Clips
33	October 28, 2009	Chelsea Handler	David Gregory in 10@10
Arsenio Hall At The World Series, Jaywalking
34	October 29, 2009	Dave Salmoni	Tina Fey in 10@10,
Jim Norton Uninvited Guest, Things We Found on eBay
35	October 30, 2009	John Cusack	Frank Caliendo, Adam Carolla
Jackass of the Month

=== November ===
No.	Original release date	Guest(s)	Musical/entertainment guest(s)
36	November 2, 2009	Mariah Carey	Cirque du Soleil
Ghosting, Headlines
37	November 3, 2009	Katie Featherston and Micah Sloat	The Biggest Loser contestant Tracey Yukich
Battle of the Celebrity All Stars: The Real Housewives of Atlanta Edition
38	November 4, 2009	Jenna Bush	Laura Bush in 9@9, Sebastian Maniscalco
The Dan Band - Missed Connections
39	November 5, 2009	Wanda Sykes	Rachael Ray in 10@10
Pumpcasting, Bing Photo Search
40	November 6, 2009	Elizabeth Banks	CC Sabathia in 10@10
Goofy Products, Liz Feldman Teaches Kindergarten
41	November 9, 2009	Kathy Griffin	Diablo Cody in 10@10
Headlines, Green Car Challenge - Kathy Griffin, Internet Success & Failure
42	November 10, 2009	Howie Mandel	The Biggest Loser castoffs Daniel Wright and Shay Sorrells
Owen Benjamin Writes Your Jingle, Jaywalking
43	November 11, 2009	Sandra Bullock	Guy Fieri in 10@10
Leno's JMZ - Tobin Bell & Florence Henderson, Craiglist Confidential
44	November 12, 2009	Penélope Cruz	Dolly Parton in 9@9, Elon Gold, Luc Robitaille
Extreme Johnny Vs. Robitaille: Hockey Hero
45	November 13, 2009	Terrence Howard, Terry Bradshaw	Sheryl Crow
Q&A With T&J, Green Car Challenge - Terrence Howard, Dealing With The Public
46	November 16, 2009	Taylor Lautner	Heather Locklear in 10@10
Green With Unger, Headlines
47	November 17, 2009	The Biggest Loser contestant Rebecca Meyer, Kevin Nealon	Tyra Banks in 10@10
Jaywalking
48	November 18, 2009	Larry the Cable Guy	Frank Caliendo, Adam Carolla, Meghan McCain, Diablo Cody, Jim Norton
Jay's Green Tip, Frank Caliendo Goes Jaywalking, Green Car Challenge - Sheryl Crow, Who Cares What They Think?
49	November 19, 2009	Dakota Fanning	Kate Flannery, Jeff Dunham, Mikey Day
Green Week Tips, JMZ Twilight Sequel: Newer Moon, 99 Cent Products
50	November 20, 2009	Kellan Lutz	Ed Begley, Jr., Arsenio Hall
Green Car Challenge - Ed Begley, Jr., Green, Not Green?
51	November 23, 2009	Arnold Schwarzenegger	Lady Gaga
Green Car Challenge - Arnold Schwarzenegger & Jay Leno, Headlines
52	November 24, 2009	Charles Barkley	The Biggest Loser contestant Allen Smith, Lady Gaga
Products That Should Never Merge
53	November 25, 2009	Paula Patton	Jimmie Johnson in 10@10
The Surly Psychic, Leno's JMZ
54	November 26, 2009	Megan Fox	United States Army, Marine Corps, Navy, Air Force, Coast Guard
Jaywalking
55	November 30, 2009	Bill Maher	Jennifer Lopez in 10@10, Adam Carolla
Headlines, Jackass of the Month, Elon Gold: Super Nanny

=== December ===
No.	Original release date	Guest(s)	Musical/entertainment guest(s)
56	December 2, 2009	John Travolta	Kim Kardashian in 9@9, Ross Mathews, Ed Asner
Meal Or No Meal
57	December 3, 2009	Morgan Freeman	Maxwell, Nick Thune
Jaywalking
58	December 4, 2009	Kelsey Grammer	Taylor Swift in 10@10, Ross Mathews, Terry Bradshaw
Leno's Book of World Records
59	December 7, 2009	Susan Sarandon	Andrea Bocelli with The Muppets
Headlines, Photo Booth
60	December 8, 2009	Gabourey Sidibe	Winner of The Biggest Loser Danny Cahill
The Dan Band - Missed Connections, Cop 'N Kitty,
61	December 9, 2009	Quentin Tarantino	Drew Brees in 9@9, Jim Norton
Green Car Challenge - Quentin Tarantino
62	December 10, 2009	Matt Damon	Barry Manilow
Bad Ads
63	December 11, 2009	Gordon Ramsay	Brad Paisley in 10@10
Who Cares What They Think?
64	December 14, 2009	Anna Kendrick	Tim McGraw in 9@9
Headlines, Green Car Challenge - Anna Kendrick, Leno's JMZ
65	December 15, 2009	Christina Applegate	Nick Lachey in 10@10, Richard Roeper
Jay's Student Film, The Dan Band - Kay Jewelers, Liz Feldman: Forecasting Love
66	December 16, 2009	Sigourney Weaver	John Mayer, Owen Benjamin
Battle of the Celebrity All Stars: Jersey Shore Edition
67	December 17, 2009	Sam Worthington	Mary J. Blige, Elon Gold
Elon Gold: Plastic Surgeon, Green Car Challenge - Sam Worthington, Jay's Celebrity Christmas
68	December 18, 2009	Glenn Beck	Kate Gosselin in 10@10
Sebastian Maniscalco Clothing Etiquette Lessons, Jay Leno Holiday Party, Mistletoe Ambush
69	December 21, 2009	Adam Lambert	Jeff Bridges in 10@10
Headlines
70	December 22, 2009	Dane Cook	Michelle Rodriguez in 10@10, Ross Mathews, Nota, Adam Carolla, Meghan McCain, Jim Norton
Green Car Challenge - Dane Cook, Who Cares What They Think?
71	December 23, 2009	Julie Scardina	African Children's Choir
Ross Mathews: Oakwood Christmas

== 2010 ==
=== January ===
No.	Original release date	Guest(s)	Musical/entertainment guest(s)
72	January 4, 2010	Tim Allen	Snooki in 10@10
Headlines, Green Car Challenge - Tim Allen (2nd time)
73	January 5, 2010	Kim Kardashian	Jillian Michaels, Guy Fieri
74	January 6, 2010	Hugh Jackman	Katie Couric in 10@10, Ross Mathews, Jim Norton
75	January 7, 2010	Denzel Washington	Cris Collinsworth in 9@9
Leno's JMZ
76	January 8, 2010	Brian Williams	Steve Burns, Ross Mathews, Owen Benjamin
World Series of Beer Pong
77	January 11, 2010	Bill Cosby	Mike Sorrentino in 10@10
Headlines
78	January 12, 2010	Sandra Bullock	Anderson Cooper on 10@10
Jaywalking: Faces of the Decade
79	January 13, 2010	Heidi Klum	Kourtney Kardashian in 10@10
80	January 14, 2010	Dwayne Johnson	Jimmy Kimmel in 10@10, Owen Benjamin
Green Car Challenge - Dwayne Johnson
81	January 15, 2010	Julianne Moore	Ricky Gervais, Terry Bradshaw
82	January 18, 2010	Emily Blunt	Ringo Starr, Ben Harper
Headlines
83	January 19, 2010	Chelsea Handler	Michael Jordan in 10@10
84	January 20, 2010	James Cameron	Selena Gomez in 10@10
85	January 21, 2010	Billy Crystal	Zoe Saldaña in 10@10, Elon Gold
Bad Ads
86	January 25, 2010	Mark Harmon	Alonzo Bodden
Headlines
87	January 26, 2010	Mel Gibson	Jason Reitman in 10@10, Bob Harper
Jaywalking
88	January 28, 2010	Bill Paxton	Scott Brown in 10@10, Nick Jonas and the Administration
The Dan Band
89	January 29, 2010	Howie Mandel	Adam Carolla
Jackass of the Month

=== February ===
No.	Original release date	Guest(s)	Musical/entertainment guest(s)
90	February 1, 2010	Jessica Alba	John Shuster
Headlines
91	February 3, 2010	Jessica Biel	Jimmy Fallon in 10@10
99 Cent Store Shopping Spree
92	February 4, 2010	Wanda Sykes	Evan Lysacek
Things We Found on eBay
93	February 5, 2010	Bill Maher	Gretchen Bleiler in 9@9, Ross Mathews
94	February 8, 2010	Emma Roberts	Charles Barkley in 10@10 Carrot Top
Headlines
95	February 9, 2010	Ashton Kutcher, Gabourey Sidibe	Bob Costas in 10@10, Donald Trump, Kurt Warner
Comedy segment with Jay called, "A Look Back.", Series finale
