= William Coffey =

William Coffey may refer to:

- William Coffey (VC) (1829–1875), Irish recipient of the Victoria Cross
- William Coffey (cricketer) (1885–?), Irish cricketer
- William S. Coffey, American lawyer, politician, and judge from New York
- Willie Coffey (born 1958), Scottish National Party (SNP) politician
- William Coffey (Irish politician) (1851–1937), Irish politician and Lord Mayor of Dublin
