= Michael Aron (politician) =

American politician

Member of the New Hampshire House of Representatives from the Sullivan 8th district
- Incumbent
- Assumed office December 4, 2024 Serving with Hope Damon
- Preceded by: Jonathan Stone
- Succeeded by: Samuel Deering (elect)

Personal details
- Party: Republican
- Relations: Judy Aron (wife)
- Education: State University of New York at New Paltz, University of New Haven
- Website: Campaign website

Michael Aron is an American politician. He serves as a Republican member for the Sullivan 8th district of the New Hampshire House of Representatives.

== Biography ==
Aron has a psychology degree from State University of New York at New Paltz and a master's degree in organizational industrial psychology from the University of New Haven. He retired from being an information technology manager at an insurance company in 2022. He is also a member of Toastmasters International, and achieved its highest rank, distinguished toastmaster, twice.

== Political career ==
Aron started out his political career as a member of the Acworth planning board, becoming chairman in 2023. In 2022, he was appointed to head the budgetary committee of the Fall Mountain Regional School District. He is also part of the Acworth Community Project, a nonprofit that runs a store. He has been the chair of the Sullivan County Republican Committee since 2018. Aron was elected to the New Hampshire House of Representatives in 2024 to represent the Sullivan 8th district.

== Personal life ==
Aron has three adult children with his wife, Judy Aron. Judy was first elected in 2022, and in 2024 they campaigned together, sharing a campaign website.
