= Jack Coffey (rugby union) =

- Full name: John James Coffey
- Born: 6 May 1877 Dublin, Ireland
- Died: 28 September 1945 (aged 68) Dublin, Ireland

Rugby union career
- Position: Forward
International career
Years	Team	Apps	(Points)
1900–10	Ireland	19	(0)

John James Coffey (6 May 1877 — 28 September 1945) was an Irish international rugby union player.

== Biography ==
Coffey was the elder brother of first-class cricketer William Coffey.

A Lansdowne forward, Coffey was capped 19 times for Ireland between 1900 and 1910, which included nine Home Nations campaigns. He also appeared against the 1905–06 New Zealand and 1906–07 South African touring sides.

Coffey was appointed president of the Irish Rugby Football Union in 1924.

== See also ==
- List of Ireland national rugby union players
