= John Joseph O'Connor =

John Joseph O'Connor may refer to:

- John O'Connor (cardinal), archbishop of New York
- John J. O'Connor (bishop of Newark), American prelate of the Catholic Church.
- John J. O'Connor (congressman), U.S. Representative from New York
- John J. O'Connor (journalist), American journalist and critic
- Jack O'Connor (catcher), utility player in Major League Baseball

== See also ==
- John O'Connor (disambiguation)
