= John Connor (disambiguation) =

John Connor is a character in the Terminator films and television series.

John Connor may also refer to:

== Government and politics ==
- John Connor (Illinois politician)
- John Connor (Irish politician) (1944–2024), Fine Gael TD for Roscommon
- John T. Connor (1914–2000), American attorney, US Secretary of Commerce, 1965–1967
- Johnny Connor (1899–1955), Irish politician, Clann na Poblachta TD for Kerry North

== Sports ==
- John Connor (baseball) (1861–1905), American baseball player
- John Connor (footballer, born 1893), Huddersfield Town player
- John Connor (footballer, born 1914), Bolton Wanderers and Tranmere Rovers player
- John Connor (soccer) (born 1953), Scottish-born Canadian football (soccer) player

== Other ==
- John Connor (Australia), Australian attorney and business executive
- John Connor (mariner) (1727–1758), mariner
- John Connor (Medal of Honor) (1845–1907), American soldier and Medal of Honor recipient
- "John Conner", alias of conspiracy theorist Mark Dice, inspired by the Terminator character

== Fictional characters ==
- John Connor, a character in the Michael Crichton novel Rising Sun and the film adaptation
- Johnny Connor (Coronation Street), fictional character from Coronation Street
- John Kahner, a fused mash-up version of the characters Johnny Cage and Shao Khan in Mortal Kombat 1

== See also ==
- Jon Connor, American rapper
- John Connors (disambiguation)
- John O'Connor (disambiguation)
- Jack Connor (disambiguation)
- John Conner (disambiguation)
