= Harry Thrift =

Irish rugby union player

- Born: 24 December 1882 Portobello, Dublin, Ireland
- Died: 2 February 1958 (aged 75) Rathgar, Dublin, Ireland
- School: The High School, Dublin
- University: Trinity College Dublin
- Notable relative: William Thrift (brother)
- Occupation: Academic

Rugby union career
- Position: Wing
International career
Years	Team	Apps	(Points)
1904–09	Ireland	18	(15)

Harry Thrift (24 December 1882 — 2 February 1958) was fellow and Physics lecturer at Trinity College Dublin and an Irish international rugby union player.

Born in Portobello, Dublin, Thrift was the younger brother of academic and politician William Thrift. He attended The High School, Dublin, and Trinity College Dublin, where he made the first XV in 1902 as a wing three-quarter. A speedy player, Thrift won a 440 yards national championship in 1906 and got a mention in the "Wandering rocks" chapter of the famous James Joyce novel Ulysses, in reference to his participation in a quarter-mile bicycle race.

Thrift captained Ireland amongst his 18 caps from 1904 to 1909. He formed a productive three-quarter partnership with centre James Cecil Parke, who was also a noted tennis player. His five career tries included one on debut against Wales, helping Ireland to a 11–6 win which gave them a share of the Home Nations title, preventing a triple crown for the Welsh. He was both a selector and president of the Irish Rugby Football Union during the early 1920s.

An academic, Thrift was a fellow and physics lecturer at Trinity College Dublin. He served as bursar of the Dublin University Central Athletic Club, of which he was a founding member.

== See also ==
- List of Ireland national rugby union players
