= List of The Tonight Show with Jay Leno sketches =

This is a list of segments appearing on The Tonight Show with Jay Leno. A few segments have also been used for The Jay Leno Show, as well as on Jay Leno's hosting tenure on You Bet Your Life.

- 99 Cent Shopping Spree: Leno shows off real items collected from a local 99 cent store, which have any assembly mistakes (hair combs in a bag labeled sun glasses), poorly translated words on directions or packaging, or if they are just tacky items.
- Ask the Fruitcake Lady: Marie Rudisill, an outspoken older woman and aunt of Truman Capote, responded to questions about relationships, sex and family. She was originally on the show to promote her cookbook about fruitcake, hence the segment's name. This segment was discontinued in November 2006 upon Rudisill's death.
- Ask Jay Anything: Jay asked the audience anything by answering questions. On the May 12, 2003 episode, there was a variant called "Ask Katie Anything (Cause Jay's Not Here)".
- Beyondo: Leno would work with Kevin Eubanks on trying to summon people from the great beyond; green screen camera tricks used to make only Leno's head visible.
- Celebrity Interviews: Leno will conduct an interview with a celebrity or recent major news name. The person in question is an obvious parody designed to utilize humorous responses. This often occurs "via satellite," but the character's portions are done on the musical performance part of the stage. Fred Willard (as "Willard J. Fredericks") and Gilbert Gottfried are the most common actors used for the segment, as well as Steve Bridges impersonating George W. Bush. Another variation consists of "Phony Interviews," an edited segment where Jay asks comedic questions on set, followed by the actual subject's response at a news conference or on a news interview show.
- Celebrity Jeopardy: A Jeopardy! game that includes people in costumes portraying famous people in the news. George W. Bush, and Martha Stewart, are commonly portrayed. Gilbert Gottfried, who is always included on the panel, portrays other uncommon characters such as the Easter Bunny or Pontius Pilate, and is characterized by his frequent use of the phrase, "Son of a bitch!" at some point during the segment.
- Comedic Products: Depending on the season, Leno will bring out comedic spins on gifts, media releases and "inventions that didn't work out." (for example: A Day After Tomorrow home game for the summer months). It also came out in a different iteration, as being supposedly sold through the NBCCC (Nothing But Cheap Crap Channel), with Leno playing the channel's resident host, Bob Johnson.
- Cop 'N Kitty: Leno portrays a police officer, with a kitten as his sidekick. Originated at The Jay Leno Show.
- Dealing with the Public: Leno plays real police or 911 audio/video recordings that are ridiculous, stupid or funny, such as a man who called 911 and admitted that he was high after smoking marijuana and asked the operator the score of a Detroit Red Wings game.
- Does This impress Ed Asner? Individuals perform stunts or show off a talent in front of Ed Asner. Asner comments on whether or not the act impresses him. Similar to the former Late Show with David Letterman stunt, "Is This Anything?".
- Does This Impress William Shatner? Individuals perform stunts or show off a talent in front of William Shatner. Shatner comments on whether or not the act impresses him. Similar to the former Late Show with David Letterman stunt, "Is This Anything?".
- Don't Try This at Home: Individuals perform stunts that are dangerous. As the segment's name suggests, the home and studio audience should not try these acts as the performers have trained themselves to do their stunts, and people who haven't would likely accidentally injure or kill themselves if they attempt it. The majority of the performers performing their talents in this segment are male, with very few appearing in the segment being female.
- Duller Image Catalog: Leno will present outrageous and crude products created by the staff. A play on The Sharper Image Catalog.
- Fake Spokesperson Auditions: People are asked to be a spokesperson for a TV ad. Each person is asked to read cue cards, or do strange things, as part of an advertisement for a fake product. At the end of the "ad", the person is asked to say "I'm on the Tonight Show with Jay Leno".
- Headlines: Humorous print items sent in by viewers. These real-life headlines are usually newspaper and magazine stories, business/retail and classified advertisements, and other article clippings containing typographical and photographic errors, inadvertently humorous descriptions or unintentionally inappropriate items. The segment usually starts out with a fake, humorous headline during the introduction sequence of the segment, such as Arabs Wish Bush "A Happy Shoe Year!", usually reflecting some current event. Reflecting Jay's moving of this segment to a 10:00 p.m. ET/PT time slot in 2009, the title sequence headline on the final broadcast of this segment was 4 Out Of 5 Scientists Say "Headlines" Funnier at 10PM Than 11:30PM. The segment aired on Monday nights, unless the Monday episode (or the entire week's slate of episodes) was a repeat or if a segment featuring a Tonight Show correspondent at an event aired in its place, in which "Headlines" aired in the next new episode.
- Hockey Player or Medication? Leno shows the audience a word and the audience determines whether it is an NHL player's last name or a kind of medication.
- Howie Do It: Using a hidden camera, Howie Mandel would play practical jokes on average citizens. This bit became much less common after the beginning of Howie's program Deal or No Deal. "Howie Do It" was later spun off into a television series by that name, which briefly ran in spring 2009.
- Iron Jay: Pumping iron questions with a muscle headed Leno. His body was made to look bigger with mirrors and the camera.
- Jaywalking: A pre-recorded segment, "Jaywalking" is a play on the host's name and the illegal practice of jaywalking. Up to 15 people are interviewed in an hour or less for each segment, with about nine interviews used on the air. Leno asks people questions about current news and other topics in public areas around Los Angeles (usually Hollywood Boulevard, Melrose Avenue or Universal Studios). Most responses are outrageously incorrect; for example, one person believed that Abraham Lincoln was the first president, and another could not identify a picture of Hillary Clinton. Sometimes the questions are of the "What color is the White House?" level, such as asking in what country the Panama Canal is located. (These are similar to questions featured on the syndicated comedy game show Street Smarts. Not only has Howard Stern stated that the segment was lifted from his radio show, but there is recorded proof that Stern did the bit long before Leno.) Some of the interviewees prove so popular with viewers that they become regulars on The Tonight Show itself. Such examples are Jaywalk All-Stars Kip and Kim, who have a recurring segment on the show entitled What would Kip and Kim Do?, where people in situations ask them for advice. Their responses are often ridiculous and done to make the audience laugh. Another frequent Jaywalking guest, Angela Ramos, quickly became popular (due to her nasally high-pitched laugh, similar to that of Fran Drescher) and joined the show for a time as a correspondent. Segments related or similar to "Jaywalking" include:
  - Battle of the Jaywalk All-Stars: Some of the lowest-scoring "Jaywalkers" are brought back onto the show to be asked simple questions to see which one can score higher. According to Leno, he at first expected that contestants, after watching themselves on television, would study facts ahead of appearing on Jaywalk All-Stars. (Leno: "Not a problem!")
  - Steve the Judgmental Bastard: An entertaining riff on "Jaywalking" in which Steve Schirripa predicts how random people on the street will answer questions about themselves based on how they look.
  - Tattoo or no tattoo? Leno interviews a person followed by the audience guessing whether they have a tattoo.
- Listen to Iman: Leno would let model Iman give advice to audience members.
- Meal or No Meal: Three panelists watch a talent show consisting of three audience contestants. After each talent is displayed, the judges decide on whether it impresses them enough to give them a free meal at a local restaurant.
- Midnight Confessions: Members of the audience tell a story about something in their life about which they are embarrassed. Often, at the end of the confession, a product appropriate for the situation is presented to the person (often by Gilbert Gottfried).
- Mr. Brain: Leno acting as a brainiac, taking questions from the audience. His head was made to look bigger with mirrors and the camera.
- Photo Booth: A real free photo booth is set up at Universal Studios Hollywood, and people inside are bothered and made fun of before getting their picture taken. The booth's voice is provided by comedian Kira Soltanovich.
- Pitch To America: Whenever a screenwriters convention is held in the U.S., a Tonight Show camera crew sets up an area where screenwriters can walk up and make a pitch for a movie script or television show that he/she has been working on. More recently, the crew goes to a trade show, where inventors pitch their product, and the audience is asked if it "sold" or "not sold" (similar to the Stuff We Found on eBay segment).
- Pumpcast News: A fake news anchor, played by Timothy Stack, displayed on a TV screen at a gas station harasses and bothers the customers pumping gas.
- Pumpernickel Bread Special: A segment where Leno invites celebrity chefs to share hilarious recipes.
- Presidential Jeopardy! Leno portrayed Jay Trebek (a parody of Alex Trebek), as presidential contestants supply questions for answers.
- Ross the Intern: Ross Mathews, an intern for the show, is sent to participate in special events. As part of a running gag, Leno started introducing Ross as his illegitimate son.
- Sidewalking: A camera and microphone are set up in a public location (e.g., on the street, on a college campus), individuals step up to the microphone and perform whatever they desire.
- Steve Irwin bringing in Snakes and Crocodiles. Discontinued due to Steve Irwin's death in 2006.
- Stuff We Found on eBay: Leno brings up some of the oddest stuff that he has supposedly found while searching on eBay, and the studio audience must determine whether the object was sold or not.
- Survey Says: People at the Third Street Promenade in Los Angeles are asked to take a survey for a gift certificate of a store. Cast members use the information the person provides on the survey (college, hometown, work, etc.) to pretend to know the target.
- Teenage Wasteland: Teenagers perform a stunt or talent they possess. Similar to the Late Show with David Letterman stunts, "Audience Show and Tell" and "Stupid Human Tricks." Most of the teenagers performing their talents in this segment are male, with few appearing in the segment being female.
- The Audience Wants to Know: Selected audience members are chosen to ask Leno questions, and in response, Leno shows a video clip relating to the subject.
- The Economy is Bad: During the Monologue, Leno tells a series of one-liner jokes themed around the current state of the economy. He has acknowledged that the cadence is a tribute to Rodney Dangerfield, and a quick playing of Hooray for Hollywood follows each joke.
- The Fine Print: At his desk Leno presents regular everyday products but when zoomed in to reveal the fine print there is a message telling what the product's real intentions are (example: a bag of chips that warns that eating the product will make one fat).
- The Worst-Selling Products on Amazon.com: Leno will show a best-selling book, DVD, or CD available at Amazon.com, and then show a totally fictitious, but similarly designed and humorously titled item that is supposedly a complete flop at Amazon.
- They Walk Among Us: Leno presents images of celebrities and their supposed look-alikes, who were discreetly taped in Burbank. He says they were products of cloning experiments gone wrong.
- Tonight Show phone in. Tapes of celebrity voices are played while Leno talks with them.
- Truth in Labeling: Leno displays products whose names have been changed by the Food and Drug Administration (FDA) and are now renamed for their most common uses. For example, a United States one hundred-dollar bill called "gas money."
- Videos We Found on YouTube: A prototypical Leno segment where he shows amusing videos supposedly found on YouTube. However, the videos are not viewed on YouTube but video files instead. "Zoo Tube" features similar videos of animals.
- Virtual Jay: Computer-generated animation of Leno. According to the skit, when Leno heated up a burrito with the foil still on it in the microwave while at his computer, it caused an electrical shock to come from the microwave to Leno to his computer, thus causing Leno to "travel" through the Internet. It usually involved gags to emphasize some of his recurring jokes at the time (e.g., "Virtual Jay" in a page with the picture of a desert and then realizing that he was in Dan Quayle's webpage during his failed 1996 run for president).
- What's George Bush Doing Today? Started after George W. Bush left office, shows what Bush (played by Steve Bridges) is doing since leaving political office. It features Bush doing things like playing Dance Dance Revolution, having a lightsaber duel with Dick Cheney, or dancing to "Dragostea din tei" (in a parody of the Internet meme Numa Numa).
- Wheel of Consolation: In the final weeks of an American Idol season, the person voted off comes on The Tonight Show and is given a chance to spin the wheel of consolation, which contains three elaborate sounding prizes. The wheel is rigged to stop on a certain item, when the contestant receives a play off of the item won. For example, if the wheel stops on 'Breakfast with Royalty,' the Burger King mascot presents the contestant with a breakfast sandwich.
- Zoo Tube: Leno shows video clips of animals at the zoo.
