= Gerald Reidy =

Irish rugby union player

Gerard Reidy
- Full name: Gerard F. Reidy
- Born: 13 May 1926 Cork, Ireland
- Died: 19 August 2012 (aged 86) Cork, Ireland

Rugby union career
- Position: Wing forward
International career
Years	Team	Apps	(Points)
1953–54	Ireland	5	(0)

Gerard F. Reidy (13 May 1926 — 19 August 2012) was an Irish international rugby union player.

A Cork-born forward, Reidy played for Dolphin RFC from his junior years and also appeared with Lansdowne. He gained five Ireland caps, debuting in the side's final 1953 Five Nations fixture, against Wales in Swansea. After missing Ireland's 1953–54 season opener against the All Blacks, Reidy returned to the back row in place of Ronnie Kavanagh and appeared in all of their 1954 Five Nations matches. He made 20 representative appearances for Munster.

Reidy served as president of the Irish Rugby Football Union in 1983–84.

== See also ==
- List of Ireland national rugby union players
