= John Cashman (1890s hurler) =

Irish hurler

Personal information
- Native name: Seán Ó Cíosáin (Irish)
- Born: Blackrock, County Cork, Ireland

Sport
- Sport: Hurling
- Position: Forward
Club
- Years: Club
- Blackrock
Club titles
- Cork titles: 8
Inter-county*
Years	County	Apps (scores)
1891-1894	Cork	8
Inter-county titles
- Munster titles: 3
- All-Irelands: 3
- *Inter County team apps and scores correct as of 13:39, 3 May 2015.

John Cashman was an Irish sportsperson. He played hurling with his local club Blackrock and was a member of the Cork senior inter-county team from 1892 until 1894. Cashman, together with his teammate John O'Connor, became the first players to win three All-Ireland winners' medals on the field of play.

== Playing career ==
=== Club ===
Cashman played his club hurling with the famous Blackrock club and enjoyed much success throughout the first decade of club activity in Cork. Over the course of twelve championship seasons Blackrock qualified for nine county finals, with victory coming on eight occasions. Cashman was a key member of the team for all of these successes, beginning in 1887 when he captured his first county senior championship title. A second county title quickly followed in 1889. Blackrock were unlucky not to capture a five-in-a-row in the 1890s, however, defeat in 1892 broke the chain. In spite of this Cashman added to his medals tally with victories in 1891, 1893, 1894 and 1895. He finished off his career with Blackrock by winning a two-in-a-row in 1897 and 1898.

=== Inter-county ===
Cashman first came to prominence on the inter-county scene with Cork as part of the Blackrock selection in 1892. That year he lined out in his first provincial decider with All-Ireland champions Kerry providing the opposition. An exciting game developed, however, at full-time Cork were the champions by 5-3 to 2-5. It was Cashman's first Munster title. Cork's next game was an All-Ireland final meeting with Dublin. The game was a controversial one as referee Dan Fraher changed his mind after initially awarding a goal to Cork. He eventually decided that the GAA's Central Council should decide the matter. Dublin, however, had walked off the field and, because of this, Cork were awarded the title. It was Cashman's first All-Ireland title.

Cashman was a member of the Cork hurling team again in 1893. That year he added a second Munster title to his collection following a 5-3 to 0-0 defeat of Limerick. It was Cashman's first Munster title. Kilkenny provided the opposition in the subsequent All-Ireland final. Cork won the game on probably the most unsuitable playing field in hurling history. After someone had neglected to get the grass cut at Ashtown, both teams moved to the Phoenix Park where the game took place. A 6-8 to 0-2 victory gave Cashman a second All-Ireland title.

For a third consecutive year Cashman was selected for championship duty with Cork once again. An easy 3-4 to 1-2 defeat of Tipperary in the provincial decider gave him a third consecutive Munster winners' title. For the second time in three years Dublin provided the opposition in the subsequent All-Ireland final. The game turned into an absolute rout as Cork won easily bu 5-20 to 2-0. Cashman entered the record books as he collected his third All-Ireland winners' title. It was his last game with the Cork hurling team.

== Honours ==
=== Blackrock ===
- Cork Senior Hurling Championship: 3
  - Winner (8): 1887, 1889, 1891, 1893, 1894, 1895, 1897, 1898
  - Runner-up (1): 1892

=== Cork ===
- All-Ireland Senior Hurling Championship: 3
  - Winner (3): 1892, 1893, 1894
- Munster Senior Hurling Championship: 3
  - Winner (3): 1892, 1893, 1894

== Sources ==
- Corry, Eoghan, The GAA Book of Lists (Hodder Headline Ireland, 2005).
- Cronin, Jim, A Rebel Hundred: Cork's 100 All-Ireland Titles.
- Donegan, Des, The Complete Handbook of Gaelic Games (DBA Publications Limited, 2005).
