= John Conner =

John Conner (person) may refer to:

- John Conner (American football) (born 1987), American football fullback
- John Conner (footballer) (1896–?), Scottish forward who played for Belfast Distillery, Crystal Palace and Newport County
- John C. Conner (1842–1873), U.S. Representative from Texas
- John Conner (1775–1826), founder of Connersville, Indiana
- John Chellis Conner (1913–2001), American marimbist
- John Wayne Conner (1956–2016), American murderer executed in Georgia
- Jack Conner (footballer, born 1898) (1898–1967), Scottish wing-half who played for Alloa Athletic, Celtic, Plymouth Argyle, Newport County and Torquay United
- Mark Dice (born 1977), American conspiracy theorist formerly known by the pseudonym John Conner

== See also ==
- John Connor (disambiguation) (other uses)
