= Linda Tanner =

American politician

Member of the New Hampshire House of Representatives from the Sullivan 9th district
- In office 2012-2014 – 2016-present
- Preceded by: Virginia Irwin

Personal details
- Party: Democratic

Linda Tanner is an American politician, who represents the Sullivan 9th District in the New Hampshire House of Representatives. A member of the Democratic Party, she represented the district from 2012 to 2014, before returning to office in 2016.
