= Robert Stevenson (rugby union, born 1866) =

Rugby union player from Northern Ireland

- Born: 27 March 1866 Dungannon, County Tyrone, Ireland
- Died: 26 August 1960 (aged 94) Dungannon, County Tyrone, Northern Ireland

Rugby union career
- Position: Forward
International career
Years	Team	Apps	(Points)
1887–93	Ireland	14	(0)

Robert Stevenson (27 March 1866 — 26 August 1960) was an Irish international rugby union player.

Born in Dungannon, County Tyrone, Stevenson attended the Royal School Dungannon and was employed at his father's linen factory, which he took over at the end of his playing career.

Stevenson, a forward, was capped 14 times for Ireland as a forward from 1887 to 1893. He captained Ireland in a 1891 Home Nations match against Wales in Llanelli and served as president of the Irish Rugby Football Union in 1912–13. His younger brother James was also an Ireland player.

== See also ==
- List of Ireland national rugby union players
