= Jonathan Stone (New Hampshire politician) =

American politician

Member of the New Hampshire House of Representatives from the Sullivan 8th district
- Incumbent
- Assumed office December 7, 2022
- Succeeded by: Michael Aron

Personal details
- Party: Republican

Jonathan Stone is an American politician. He serves as a Republican member for the Sullivan 8th district of the New Hampshire House of Representatives.

== Career ==
Prior to assuming office Stone served as a police officer for the City of Claremont Police department for six years. He was fired from the police department in March 2006 after an internal investigation. During his time as a police officer there were at least 14 internal affairs reports regarding Stone's conduct. He resigned from the Claremont Police in 2007. The ACLU of New Hampshire and Union Leader Corporation sued to have Stone's records released.

Stone ran for election to the New Hampshire House of Representatives in 2020 and was defeated by incumbent John Cloutier. In 2022 Stone was elected to the New Hampshire House of Representatives in November 2022. He has a seat on the Criminal Justice and Public Safety Committee.

Stone is co-owner of a gun shop called Black Op Arms in Claremont.

== Employment misconduct ==
While Stone was serving as a police officer, he was investigated for having an inappropriate relationship with a 15 year old girl. Stone threatened to rape his supervisor's wife and children and murder his supervisor as a result of the investigation. He also made threats against fellow police officers. The file was kept private until a journalist requested the files under New Hampshire's right-to-know laws.

In 2024, it was revealed that Stone had been fired from a post as a correctional officer at the Southern State Correctional Facility in 2021 for a pattern of racist, sexist, and homophobic insults, intimidating colleagues. Since 2013, Stone was repeatedly disciplined by his superiors, including a position demotion and temporary suspension for other incidents.
