= Samuel Deering =

American politician

Member-elect of the New Hampshire House of Representatives from the Sullivan 8th district
- Assuming office December 2026
- Succeeding: Michael Aron

Personal details
- Party: Democratic

Samuel Deering is an American politician. A member of the Democratic Party, he is the member-elect for the Sullivan 8th district of the New Hampshire House of Representatives.
