= Jenny Ramsey =

American politician

Member-elect of the New Hampshire House of Representatives from the Sullivan 2nd district
- Assuming office December 2026
- Succeeding: William Palmer

Personal details
- Party: Democratic

Jenny Ramsey is an American politician. A member of the Democratic Party, she is the member-elect for the Sullivan 2nd district of the New Hampshire House of Representatives.
