= The Jay Leno Show =

American late-night talk show (2009–2010)

- Created by: Jay Leno
- Starring: Jay Leno
- Announcer: Wally Wingert
- Music by: Kevin Eubanks (as bandleader); The Primetime Band
- Country of origin: United States
- No. of seasons: 1
- No. of episodes: 95 (list of episodes)

Production
- Production locations: NBC Studios; Burbank, California
- Running time: 60 minutes (with commercials)
- Production companies: Big Dog Productions; Universal Media Studios

Original release
- Network: NBC
- Release: September 14, 2009 – February 9, 2010

Related
- The Tonight Show with Jay Leno

The Jay Leno Show is an American prime time talk show hosted by Jay Leno that was broadcast by NBC from September 14, 2009, to February 9, 2010. The series was a spiritual successor to his previous late-night talk show The Tonight Show with Jay Leno, and used a similar format consisting of a comedic monologue, followed by celebrity interviews and other comedy segments.

The program was the result of a compromise by NBC Universal's then-CEO Jeff Zucker to keep Leno with the network following his retirement from The Tonight Show and succession by Conan O'Brien. NBC hoped to attract Leno's existing fans, as well as a larger prime time audience: the network believed that The Jay Leno Show would not necessarily require high viewership to be profitable, due to its lower production costs in comparison to scripted dramas.

The Jay Leno Show was met with mixed reception from critics, who felt that the series had little differentiation from Leno's Tonight Show. Others were critical of NBC's decision to give up an hour of its weeknight lineup to Leno, due to the network's past success with dramas airing in the 10:00 p.m. ET/PT time slot. One NBC affiliate (WHDH in Boston owned by Sunbeam Television, now independent) notably planned not to air the show at all, although this decision was retracted due to complaints by the network. Although viewership of The Jay Leno Show was initially on par with NBC's projections, by November, the program's ratings began to fall significantly. NBC's affiliates complained that the declining viewership of The Jay Leno Show also had a ripple effect on the viewership of their late local newscasts.

In an effort to address the concerns, NBC announced in January 2010 that it would, following the 2010 Winter Olympics, shorten The Jay Leno Show to a half-hour, and move it to 11:35 p.m—the timeslot that had been occupied by The Tonight Show for nearly 60 years, and bump Tonight to 12:05 a.m. The decision resulted in a major public conflict between the network and Conan O'Brien, who asserted that the move would damage the highly respected Tonight Show franchise, and that he would not participate in the program if it were moved to 12:05. Despite much support for O'Brien from both the public and media professionals alike, NBC maintained its plan to move Leno to 11:35.

On January 21, 2010, NBC reached a $45 million settlement with O'Brien in order to end his contract. The Jay Leno Show ended on February 9, 2010, after being on the air for only four months, with Entertainment Weekly calling the program television's "Biggest Bomb of All Time." Leno resumed his duties as host of The Tonight Show on March 1, 2010, for a second and final tenure that lasted until his February 2014 succession by Jimmy Fallon.

== History ==
NBC announced in 2004 that Jay Leno would leave The Tonight Show in 2009, with Conan O'Brien as his replacement. Leno—who wanted to avoid a repeat of the acrimonious transition when he inherited Tonight from Johnny Carson—said at the announcement, "You can do these things until they carry you out on a stretcher, or you can get out when you're still doing good." He began to regret his decision to retire in 2007, and several networks and studios including ABC, Fox, Sony, and Tribune expressed interest in his services after leaving Tonight.

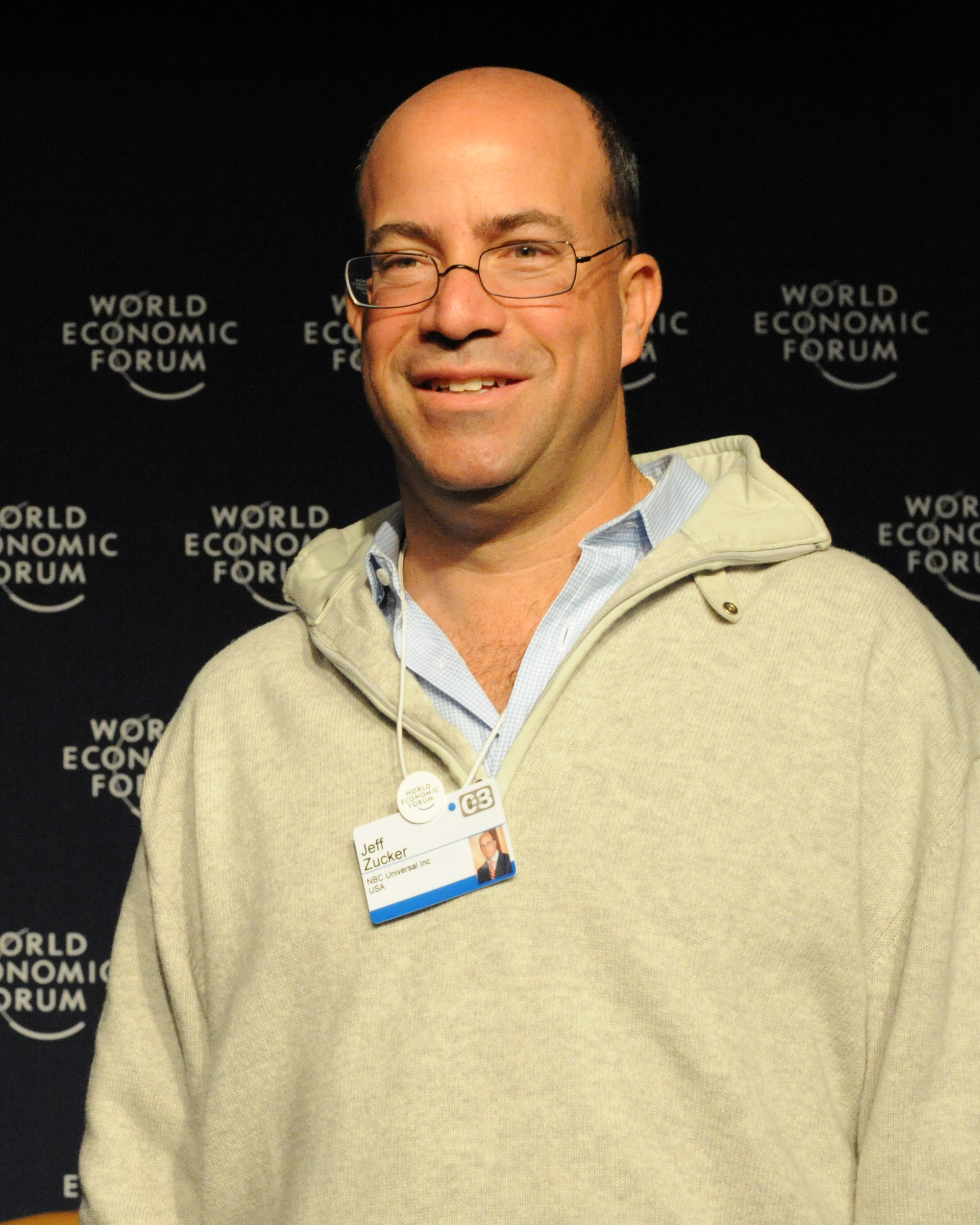
Jeff Zucker, President and CEO of NBC Universal (2007–2011).

Jeff Zucker, then-President and CEO of NBCUniversal, sought to keep Leno from defecting to a competitor. Leno rejected several NBC offers for broadcast network daytime slots or subscription TV slots, a series of recurring specials, and a half-hour show at 8 pm five nights a week featuring Leno's Tonight monologue. The network had in 1981 considered moving The Tonight Show Starring Johnny Carson to 10 pm; Zucker, who in 2007 offered Oprah Winfrey an hour five nights a week at 8 pm, now offered Leno an hour five nights a week at 10 pm. Leno was announced on December 9, 2008.

At least one station, then-affiliate WHDH-TV in Boston, Massachusetts, stated that it would not carry the program, claiming that Leno would be detrimental to the station's 11 pm news and that it would instead launch a local news program in the time slot. NBC said that such plans would amount to a flagrant violation of the network contract—a claim which WHDH disputed—and said that it would immediately remove its programming from WHDH if the station followed through with the plan. WHDH backed down on April 13, 2009, and announced that it would air Leno instead of the proposed program.

Though Leno was the first to move the entire five-day-a-week late night talk show to prime time, he was not the first Tonight alumnus to move from late night to a prime time talk show. Steve Allen hosted Tonight Starring Steve Allen from 1954 to 1957; while still hosting that show, he began hosting the prime-time The Steve Allen Show in 1956 on NBC, and the latter show would run until 1960. Jack Paar, who hosted Tonight from 1957 to 1962, next hosted a weekly talk show known as The Jack Paar Program that ran until 1965, also on NBC.

In January 2010, several news outlets reported that The Jay Leno Show would be shortened to 30 minutes and begin airing weeknights at 11:35 pm ET, with Conan O'Brien and Jimmy Fallon's shows following it beginning at 12:05 am. The scheduling change would have been implemented on February 28 after the 2010 Winter Olympics (which preempted much of NBC's primetime and late-night lineup). Leno himself commented on the rumors during his January 7 monologue, joking that NBC stands for "Never Believe your Contract." According to Broadcasting & Cable, "most [NBC affiliates] are hopeful Jay—and Conan—sticks with NBC, and most, if not all, desperately want to see a change in terms of the lead-in they're getting to their lucrative late news; the affiliates "remain fiercely loyal to Leno and were quick to say the rookie program's struggles don't reflect the funnyman's work ethic or comedic chops. 'This isn't about Jay's popularity,' says WJAR Providence VP/General Manager Lisa Churchville. 'This is about having that kind of show at 10 p.m.'"

NBC announced plans to move Leno to 11:35 pm and The Tonight Show with Conan O'Brien to 12:05 am. O'Brien refused to participate in the move and, on January 21, 2010, reached an agreement with NBC allowing him to leave the network. Leno's final episode aired on February 9, 2010 and Leno returned to Tonight as host on March 1, 2010.

== Content ==
The Jay Leno Show aired weeknights at 10:00 p.m. ET/PT (9:00 p.m. CT/MT) from Studio 11 of the NBC Studios in Burbank, California with the following format:

- After brief opening credits, a monologue of eight to 12 minutes.
- One celebrity guest, two at the most. The "car-themed" set adjusted to allow guests to get off the couch and participate in antics.
- Musical segments appeared only twice a week, in the middle of the show, and sometimes featured multiple acts performing together.
- Comedy segments were reserved for the last 15 minutes of the show, the only portion of the show where Leno sometimes used a desk. Toward the end of the four-month run certain comedy segments such as "Headlines" were moved up to airing right after Jay's monologue, as opposed to being reserved for the end of the show. They include:
  - "Headlines" and "Jaywalking", both from Tonight.
  - The "advertiser-friendly 'Green Car Challenge'". Two to three times each week, celebrities drove an electric Ford Focus and tried to set records on a 1,100-foot dedicated outdoor track. The segment was based on the "Star in a Reasonably-Priced Car" segment on the British automotive series Top Gear, which Leno had previously appeared on.
  - "Ten at Ten", "in which celebs and other newsmakers . . . answer a rapid-fire series of ten 'ridiculous, celebrity-based questions.' The ten at ten guest would not be in the studio, but would instead appear via satellite from some other location. When the off-site location was in the Central or Mountain Time Zones, the skit would be changed to 9 at 9 (since these time zones have all programming one hour earlier in their local time than the coastal time zones), which was the same except there would only be nine questions."
  - Comic "correspondents" such as D. L. Hughley, Dan Finnerty, Mikey Day, Rachael Harris, and Jim Norton did pretaped segments.

One planned segment, "Stories Not Good Enough for the NBC Nightly News" (which would have featured then-NBC Nightly News anchor Brian Williams), was dropped from the show before it made it to air.

In addition to reserving comedy segments for the end, the network aired no commercials after the show and "urged local affiliates to do the same" so local news could start immediately, retaining as many Leno viewers as possible.

=== Recurring segments ===
- "Headlines" (Monday): Humorous print items sent in by viewers. These real-life headlines are usually headlines with typographical errors, or unintentionally inappropriate items. The segment usually starts out with a fake, humorous headline during the introduction for the segment.
- "Jaywalking": A pre-taped segment, "Jaywalking" is a play on the host's name and the illegal practice of jaywalking. Leno asks people questions about current news and other topics in public areas around Los Angeles (usually Hollywood Boulevard, Melrose Avenue or Universal Studios). Most responses are outrageously incorrect; for example, one person believed that Abraham Lincoln was the first president, and another could not identify a picture of Hillary Clinton. Sometimes the questions are of the "What color is the White House?" level, such as asking in what country the Panama Canal is located. Up to 15 people are interviewed in an hour or less for each segment, with about nine interviews used on the air. A similar format was used for the game show Street Smarts.
- JMZ: A parody of TMZ, a segment in which they report on fake celebrity news with such guest stars as Chuck Liddell.
- Ten@Ten: Jay interviews a celebrity via satellite by asking them 10 questions. Some editions have only used 9 questions, calling it the "Nine@Nine" as a reference to the central or mountain time zone.
- Green Car Challenge: A segment in which celebrities go in a car and try to be the fastest in a track with obstacles. Tim Allen had the best record time; Rush Limbaugh had the record worst time (though he did so on purpose), and Leno never tried.
- Photo Booth: A pre-taped segment in which someone goes in a Photo Booth and something is amiss.
- Stuff We Found on eBay: Leno brought up some of the oddest stuff that he and members of the studio audience had supposedly found while searching on eBay.
- Ross the Intern: Ross Mathews, an intern for the show, is sent to participate in special events. As part of a running gag, Leno started introducing Ross as his illegitimate son.

=== First show ===
Jerry Seinfeld was the celebrity guest on the debut episode. Jay-Z, Rihanna, and Kanye West performed "Run This Town", in which all three are featured. West sat down for a previously unplanned interview with Leno, discussing West's outburst at the MTV Video Music Awards the previous night. Dan Finnerty was the comic correspondent for the night, and the end of the show featured Headlines.

Reviews for the first show ranged from neutral to negative, with most critics stating that the show was, despite the changes, still very similar to Tonight. Metacritic scores it at 48 out of 100 based on 23 TV critic reviews, and viewers scoring it at a 4.0 out of 10. Media Life described the show as "underwhelming" and felt that Leno "failed to rise to the occasion." The Buffalo News called the show "a mess." The Associated Press noted that "it's not a good sign when the Bud Light commercial is funnier than the comedy show it interrupts," and that "at least Rosie Live took some chances." Jonah Krakow of IGN gave it a 5.5/10 saying that "show felt like they just picked from where they left off three months ago, and I'm not sure that's a good thing".

=== Final show ===
The final Jay Leno Show aired on February 9, 2010. The guests were Ashton Kutcher, Gabourey Sidibe and Bob Costas, with unannounced visits from Donald Trump and Kurt Warner. Following the monologue, there was a brief clip reel of highlights from the show's short tenure; otherwise, little mention was made about the fact that it was the final episode of the program. The last moments of the show featured the program's "10 at 10" segment, with its celebrity guest being Bob Costas. When Leno asked Costas how it felt to be the show's final guest, the sportscaster replied, "Kind of like being involved in the last game of a Clippers season, isn't it?" Directly following the interview with Costas, Leno thanked him, told the audience to stay tuned for their local news, and then abruptly went off-air.

Many media outlets criticized Leno's apparent lack of ceremony for the end of his program. Variety reported that the lack of fanfare was intentional, as NBC was attempting to rehab the reputation of Leno and The Tonight Show and did not desire to bring any further attention to Leno's transition back to Tonight. The Associated Press noted that the last few weeks of the program, including the final episode, were pervaded by "bad vibes." The Boston Globe wrote that Leno said farewell to his short-lived show "with all the momentousness of a guy taking out the trash." The episode received negative reviews from Entertainment Weekly, the Los Angeles Times, and The Wall Street Journal. By comparison, O'Brien's final Tonight Show was treated as a finale, with guests making reference to the show ending and guest Neil Young taking an ironic tone by performing "Long May You Run".

== Impact ==
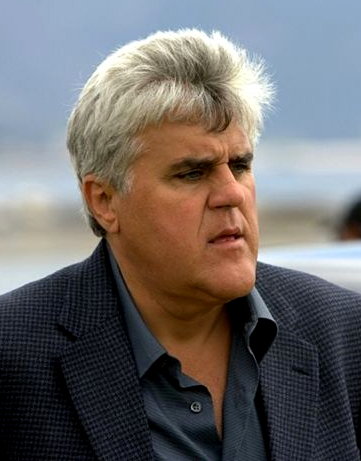
Jay Leno, creator and host

=== Financial ===
Leno had a contract for five years for the show. NBC reportedly had an option to cancel after two years, but had committed to at least one or two years regardless of ratings, although later chose to end the show after less than five months. He could have earned up to $30 million each year depending on ratings for Leno, compared to a $20 million annual salary during his last years at Tonight.

NBC expected to benefit by offering an inexpensive comedic alternative to the procedurals ("100% more comedy and 98% fewer murders!") and other one-hour dramas that typically air at 10 pm, and by offering new episodes 46 weeks each year versus 22. While Leno was not necessarily expected to be competitive with the higher-rated scripted shows on ABC and CBS in its time slot, its projected cost of production was far lower and thus it was expected to be profitable to the network, and product integration intended to make the show "as DVR-proof as you can be on television in this era". Each airing of Leno cost about $350,000 to $400,000 versus up to $3 million for an hour-long drama, saving NBC $13 million each week without the network needing the show to beat its competitors. Those costs include the services of 22 writers, whom Leno called the "top 5% of the highest-paid . . . in the Guild."

McDonald's became the first buying advertiser for the program; as part of a tie-in with its McDonald's Monopoly promotion, a "Million Dollar Roll" segment hosted by NBC personalities aired nightly during commercial breaks of The Jay Leno Show in October 2009.

=== Ratings ===
Leno did not expect his show to beat competing first-run episodes, but to do better than reruns, in part because topical jokes benefit from the "immediacy" of the time slot versus 11:30 pm. A television analyst predicted that Leno would finish in "a safe third place" every night. NBC research before the show's debut indicated that fans of Leno would watch Leno two to three times a week.

NBC saw a 1.5 rating for the show in the 18–49 demographic as "viable" and a 1.8 as a "home run". NBC told Leno that at a 1.5 rating, NBC makes $300 million a year. Tonight at 11:30 pm earned about a 1.3 to 1.5; the television audience at 10 pm is 40% larger than at 11:30 pm, and the network hoped Leno's audience would also grow. Industry observers have cited a range of ratings, from 1.7 to 2, as being necessary for the show to succeed at 10 pm. By comparison, 2.5 is generally necessary for a 10 pm drama to succeed; those that earned a 1.7 or less during the 2008–2009 season were generally cancelled. NBC's prime-time dramas averaged about 2 during 2008–2009.

The first episode of The Jay Leno Show earned "fast national" estimates of 17.7 million viewers, an 11 Nielsen rating (5.1 among persons 18–49) and an 18 share, significantly above both his Tonight finale and the debut of The Tonight Show with Conan O'Brien in all categories. By the second week and competing against season premieres, the audience fell to six million viewers, still on par with or exceeding NBC projections. As of November 1, 2009, The Jay Leno Show has averaged a 1.98 in the adults 18–49 ratings and 6.594 million viewers. During the week before Christmas, the ratings dropped to 1.4 during the week. Prior to the controversy regarding the move of the Jay Leno Show to 11:35 p.m., viewership bottomed out at 4.799 million viewers, although there was a slight bump as word of the controversy broke.

Though the show itself had been meeting the network's projections, it was severely detrimental to the ratings of the late local news on NBC affiliates. As originally feared by WHDH in Boston, several stations across the country saw what was known as the "Leno Effect", where the lower audience for Leno (as compared to NBC's scripted prime time offerings) translated directly into a domino effect of severe audience drops for late local news (on the order of 25–30%) and completely stunted NBC's past successful schedule hammocking strategies, effects that NBC had underestimated.

==== Dispute over timeslot ====
In early January 2010, multiple media outlets reported that, following the 2010 Winter Olympics, The Jay Leno Show would be shortened to 30 minutes and begin airing weeknights at 11:35 pm ET, with Conan O'Brien and Jimmy Fallon's shows following it beginning at 12:05 am on March 1, 2010. On January 10, NBC Universal Television Entertainment Chairman Jeff Gaspin confirmed that The Jay Leno Show would indeed move to 11:35.

Leno immediately accepted the return to 11:35 p.m., calling the move "all business." He had made it known in the press in November 2009 that he wished to return to his old timeslot; behind the scenes, Leno had privately indicated that he did not believe the 10:00 experiment would work. On the other hand, O'Brien's contract stipulated that the network could move the show back to 12:05 a.m. without penalty, a loophole put in primarily to accommodate sports preemptions, the network's traditional nightly Wimbledon tournament highlights show, and specials such as New Year's Eve with Carson Daly.

O'Brien did not seriously respond for several days after the announcement, then drafted a press release explaining why he felt it was unfair to him, his staff, Fallon, and the legacy of The Tonight Show to move the show past midnight. He concluded by saying that he "cannot participate in what I honestly believe is [The Tonight Show's] destruction." O'Brien received an outpouring of celebrity and viewer support for rejecting the move, while Leno received heavy criticism. On January 21, O'Brien signed a $45 million deal allowing him to leave the network, and aired his final episode of Tonight on January 22; Leno returned as host of Tonight on March 1.

=== Settlement ===
On January 19, 2010, multiple media outlets reported that O'Brien and NBC were close to signing a deal between $30 and $40 million for the host to walk away from the network. One apparent sticking point in the negotiations was the amount his staff and crew were to be paid for leaving the program. Reports also said that the contract could prohibit O'Brien from badmouthing NBC in any way, and that he may be able to return to television as early as September 2010.

On January 21, after two weeks of negotiations, it was announced that Conan O'Brien had signed a $45 million deal to leave NBC. The Wall Street Journal reports that O'Brien will receive about $32 million, with his staff receiving around $12 million. The contract contains a clause prohibiting O'Brien from making negative remarks about NBC for a certain amount of time; it does not, however, contain the previously rumored "mitigation clause," in which NBC would be able to keep some of the severance pay after O'Brien finds a new program. It also stipulates that he could have returned to television as early as September 1, 2010. The network confirmed that Leno would officially resume as host of The Tonight Show on March 1. TMZ reported that NBC would rerun episodes from O'Brien's time as host until the network began airing the Olympics on February 12.

O'Brien later reached a deal with cable network TBS to premiere a new late-night talk show, Conan.

=== Industry impact ===
NBC became the first large United States network to broadcast the same show every weekday during prime time since ABC's Who Wants to Be a Millionaire? marathons in 1999 and only the second since DuMont aired Captain Video and His Video Rangers from 1949 to 1955. More recently, the upstart MyNetwork TV had attempted, upon its launch in 2006, to air the same telenovelas every night of the week, a programming strategy that proved to be very unsuccessful. NBC's executives called the decision "a transformational moment in the history of broadcasting" and "in effect, launching five shows." An industry observer said that Leno, "in all my years, is the biggest risk a network has ever taken." According to former NBC president Fred Silverman, "If the Leno Show works, it will be the most significant thing to happen in broadcast television in the last decade."

Although NBC had not developed a new hit show at 10 pm in years, industry executives criticized the network for abandoning a history of airing quality dramas at that hour such as Hill Street Blues, St. Elsewhere, and ER, which made NBC "the gold standard for sophisticated programming . . . the No. 1 network for affluent and well-educated young viewers" during the 1980s and 1990s. In addition, critics predicted that the decision would hurt NBC by undermining a reputation built on successful scripted shows. Other networks believed NBC's decision created an opportunity, and planned their 2009–2010 schedules accordingly. For example, the show competed with The Mentalist, CSI: Miami, CSI: NY, and Numb3rs, four of television's most popular series, on CBS (the first of those four series was moved to 10:00 PM to directly compete with Leno's show, and significantly improved the ratings for that timeslot compared to its predecessor). Leno was also not easily sold overseas.

The January 29, 2010 issue of Entertainment Weekly listed the show at the top of a list of the 50 Biggest Bombs in television history. The comment made by the network executives about "launching five shows" was ultimately transformed into the joke that its removal was like "cancelling five shows." TV Guide similarly listed the show as the biggest blunder in television history in its November 1, 2010 edition.

==== Boycott by competing networks ====
Rival networks ABC and CBS had discouraged "their stars" from appearing on The Jay Leno Show in its primetime slot. Julia Louis-Dreyfus (The New Adventures of Old Christine) was the first CBS actor to appear on the show, on September 29, 2009; on that episode, she said "there was a little pressure, because as you know you are now on prime time", but that "Obviously, I committed to doing your show and we're friends". This boycott did not affect The Tonight Show with Conan O'Brien nor was it industry-wide. Other TV networks, like Fox, The CW, and HBO, were more encouraging. Hugh Laurie from the Fox TV show House was a guest on the September 25, 2009, telecast. House is produced by Universal Media Studios, a sister company to NBC through NBC Universal, and Fox does not offer any network programming in the 10 p.m. time slots, instead allowing most of its affiliates to go to local news.

In a Broadcasting & Cable interview published in early November 2009, Leno mentioned the boycott again, saying "I'm flattered; like ABC and CBS...none of their stars can appear on the show. What are you so afraid of if we're doing so terrible? It's all part of the game."

==== Labor union impact ====
John Wells, the president of the Writers Guild of America, West, and executive producer of prominent NBC shows ER and The West Wing, said, "I wish NBC and Jay Leno well; personally, he's a very nice guy, but I hope he falls flat on his face and we get five dramas back."

== Website dispute ==
In 2004, Guadalupe Zambrano, a Texas real estate agent, registered the domain name thejaylenoshow.com to redirect to his real estate business. After the Leno announcement, Leno accused Zambrano of cybersquatting. Zambrano contended that he had owned the domain for five years, well before the announcement, thus precluding recovery. The UDRP proceedings ruled in favor of Leno, however, stating that Zambrano profited from the value of the Jay Leno trademark in bad faith.

== International broadcasting ==
- In Australia, The Comedy Channel aired the show on a same-day turn weeknights at 7.30pm AEST. Free-to-air channel 7Two also aired the program at 6.00pm, usually on a 30-hour delay. It moved to middays on January 18, 2010 and ran until September 24, 2010.
- In Canada, Citytv simulcast Leno with NBC during the 2009–2010 season, requesting simultaneous substitution where applicable.
- In Portugal, SIC Mulher aired the show Monday and Tuesday at 00.30am.
- In Israel, yes stars Comedy aired the show Sundays-Thursdays at 8.00pm.
- In Finland, The Jay Leno Show aired on MTV3 MAX on weeknights; because of subtitling, the episodes were shown three days after their American broadcast.
- In Sweden, The Jay Leno Show aired on Kanal 9 on weeknights. Episodes were broadcast one week after their original American airing.
- Westwood One provided audio of the monologue as a short-form feature, under the title Last Night on The Jay Leno Show, to radio stations in the United States and Canada, replacing the discontinued Jimmy Kimmel Live! feature.
