= Jack Connor =

Jack Connor may refer to:

- Jack Connor (footballer, born 1911) (1911–1994), Scottish football centre forward
- Jack Connor (footballer, born 1919) (1919–1998), English football centre forward for Stockport County
- Jack Connor (footballer, born 1934) (1934–2010), English football defender for Huddersfield Town & Bristol City

== See also ==
- John Connor (disambiguation)
- Jack Connors (disambiguation)
- Jack O'Connor (disambiguation)
- Connor (surname)
