= John Connors =

John Connors may refer to:

- John Connors (VC) (1830–1857), Irish recipient of the Victoria Cross
- John Connors (American politician) (1922–2009), member of the Iowa House of Representatives
- John Connors (Canadian politician) (born 1944/45), leader of the Newfoundland New Democratic Party, 1970–1974
- John Connors (actor) (born 1990), Irish actor

== See also ==
- John Conyers (disambiguation)
- John Connor (disambiguation)
