= John Conyers (disambiguation) =

John Conyers (1929–2019) was an American politician.

John Conyers may also refer to:

- John Conyers (apothecary) (c. 1633–1694), pioneering English archaeologist
- John Conyers (East Grinstead politician) (1650–1725), English Member of Parliament for East Grinstead and West Looe
- John Conyers (Essex politician) (1717–1775), English Member of Parliament for Essex and Reading
- John Conyers, 3rd Baron Conyers (before 1538–1557), English aristocrat
- Sir John Conyers (died 1490), Knight of the Garter
- Sir John Conyers, 1st Baronet (died 1664), of the Conyers baronets
- Sir John Conyers, 3rd Baronet (1649–1719), of the Conyers baronets

== See also ==
- John Connors (disambiguation)
