= Jack Connors (footballer, born 1927) =

English footballer

Personal information
- Full name: John Joseph Aloysius Connors
- Date of birth: 21 August 1927
- Place of birth: Stockton, County Durham, England
- Date of death: 2006 (aged 78)
- Place of death: Corby, Northamptonshire, England
- Position: Wing half

Senior career*
Years	Team	Apps	(Gls)
19??–1948	Stockton		
1948–1952	Darlington	65	(0)
1951–19??	Corby Town		
- * Club domestic league appearances and goals

John Joseph Aloysius Connors (21 August 1927 – 2006) was an English footballer who played as a wing half in the Football League for Darlington and in non-league football for Stockton and Corby Town.

Connors played football for hometown club Stockton, before opening his Darlington career playing at outside left in a 3–1 defeat at home to Lincoln City in the Third Division North in February 1948. He soon resumed his preferred position at left half, but had to compete with Guy Wharton and Norman Parsley for the place. In just over four seasons with the club, he made 65 league appearances, before moving on to Midland League club Corby Town in 1952.
