= Jim Grenier =

American politician

Member of the New Hampshire House of Representatives from the 7th Sullivan district
- In office December 5, 2012 – December 5, 2018
- Preceded by: Constituency established
- Succeeded by: Judy Aron

Personal details
- Party: Republican

James L. "Jim" Grenier is an American politician from New Hampshire. He served in the New Hampshire House of Representatives.
