= Ron Rule =

American politician

Member-elect of the New Hampshire House of Representatives from the Sullivan 4th district
- Assuming office December 2026
- Succeeding: Judy Aron

Personal details
- Party: Republican

Ron Rule is an American politician. A member of the Republican Party, he is the member-elect for the Sullivan 4th district of the New Hampshire House of Representatives.
