= John O'Connor (Archdeacon of Emly) =

John Hutton O'Connor was Archdeacon of Emly from 1880 to 1904.

Hutton was educated at Trinity College, Dublin and ordained in 1854.

He served at Kilrush (Curate); Cappamore (Perpetual Curate);Grean (Rector) and Borris (Rector).
