= Billy Hinton =

Irish rugby union player

- Full name: William Peart Hinton
- Born: 27 October 1882 Rathgar, Dublin, Ireland
- Died: 29 August 1953 (aged 70) Dublin, Ireland
- School: Wesley College Dublin
- Occupation: Stockbroker

Rugby union career
- Position: Fullback
International career
Years	Team	Apps	(Points)
1907–12	Ireland	16	(4)

William Peart Hinton (27 October 1882 — 29 August 1953) was an Irish international rugby union player.

Educated at Wesley College Dublin, Hinton played his rugby for Old Wesley and was a specialist fullback. He was a permanent fixture in the Ireland team between 1907 and 1912, gaining a total of 16 caps.

Hinton served as a second lieutenant with the Royal Irish Regiment during World War I and in 1915 was reported as having been killed, when he had instead suffered minor shrapnel injuries to his head.

A stockbroker by profession, Hinton served a term as president of the IRFU in 1920–21.

== See also ==
- List of Ireland national rugby union players
