= John J. O'Connor (New Hampshire politician) =

American politician from New Hampshire

Member of the New Hampshire House of Representatives from the Sullivan 4th district
- In office 2016 – December 4, 2018
- Preceded by: Larry Converse
- Succeeded by: Gary Merchant

Personal details
- Party: Republican
- Education: John Jay College of Criminal Justice

John J. O'Connor is an American politician who served one term in the New Hampshire House of Representatives, representing the Sullivan 4th district from 2016 to 2018. A Republican from Claremont, New Hampshire, he defeated incumbent Larry Converse in the 2016 general election, and was defeated for re-election in 2018 by Democrat Gary Merchant.

Before entering politics, O'Connor worked in law enforcement. He attended the John Jay College of Criminal Justice.
