= Mark Dice =

American YouTuber (born 1977)

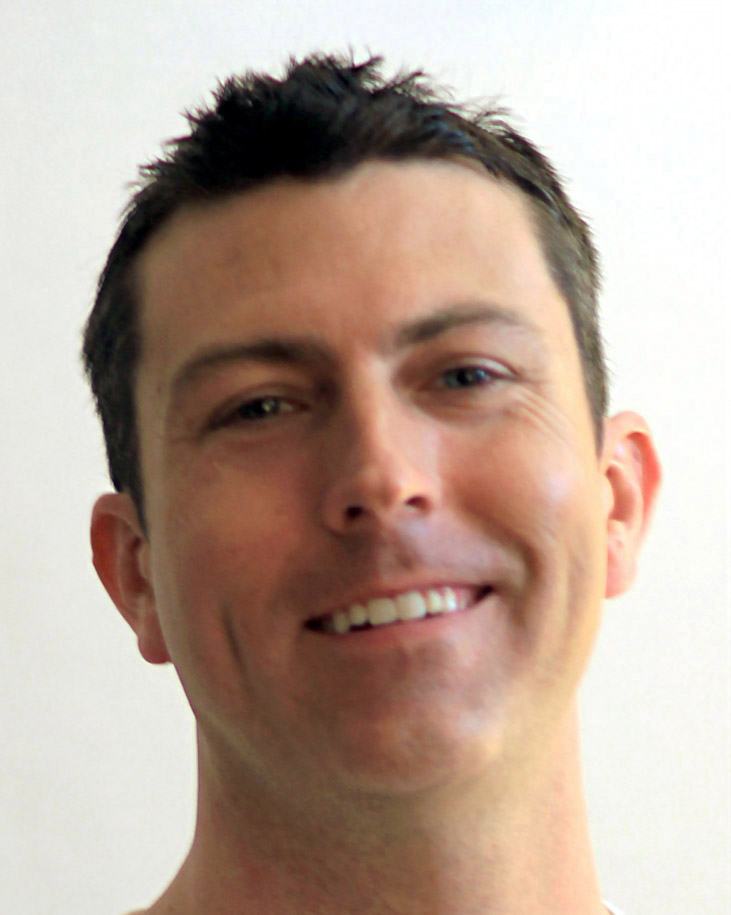
- Dice in 2011
- Born: Mark Allan Shouldice; December 21, 1977 (age 48)
- Other name: John Conner
- Education: University of Wisconsin–Milwaukee; California State University, San Marcos (BA)
- Known for: YouTube videos; right-wing conservative commentary; promoting conspiracy theories
- Political party: Republican
- Website: markdice.com

Mark Allan Shouldice (born December 21, 1977), better known as Mark Dice, is an American YouTuber, conservative political commentator, author, activist, and conspiracy theorist.

== Early life ==
Shouldice grew up in Union Grove, Wisconsin. His parents were mechanical engineer Charles K. Shouldice and high school teacher Sharon M. Green. Shouldice attended Union Grove High School, and graduated in 1997. During his senior year of high school, Shouldice wrote and published his first book called "Magic Memory" which serves as a manual providing "theories and training techniques... that can significantly improve just about anyone's memory". Shouldice initially attended the University of Wisconsin–Milwaukee. In 1999, Shouldice moved to Oceanside, California. Shouldice then attended and graduated from California State University, San Marcos with a Bachelor of Arts in Communication in 2004.

== Career ==
=== The Resistance ===
Dice is the founder of a San Diego-based Christian activist group called "The Resistance", described as being "known for its hardline stance on morality". In late 2004, Dice published the website TheResistanceManifesto.com under the pseudonym John Conner. The Village Voice wrote that his pen-name was "presumably" taken from the 1984 sci-fi film The Terminator, whose fictional protagonist was future Resistance leader John Connor. A year later, Dice self-published his web-based writings as The Resistance Manifesto under his John Conner pen name; a 2008 version of the book credited Mark Dice as the author.

In 2007, the San Diego Reader reported that Dice had his own one-hour radio talk show, "Resistance Radio", produced by Genesis Communications Network, broadcasting on Sunday nights. He said he was living in Vista, California, and that he had started a website at www.markdice.com.

In 2008, in response to Starbucks' reintroduction of its original logo (featuring a topless siren), Dice led his group and its 3,000 members in boycotting the coffee chain: "The Starbucks logo has a naked woman on it with her legs spread like a prostitute […] It's extremely poor taste, and the company might as well call themselves Slutbucks." Starbucks had more than 6,000 locations in 2008.

As the founder of The Resistance, Dice told KFSN-TV of his group's intention to disrupt theater showings of 2009's Angels & Demons because the film "is a fraud, aimed at covering up the existence of a secret society called the Illuminati." Dice contended that the Illuminati were instrumental in the September 11 attacks and the 2008 financial crisis.

=== Conspiracy theories ===
Dice has been described as a right-wing, conservative conspiracy theorist who has provided the media with his input on a broad array of topics.

In May 2005, through his website, Dice advocated for the Georgia Guidestones monument to "be smashed into a million pieces, and then the rubble used for a construction project", claiming that the Guidestones "have a deep Satanic origin and message", that "the New World Order is written all over them.", and that R. C. Christian, the person who built the guidestones, belongs to "a Luciferian secret society" related to the New World Order.

In June 2008, Dice launched "Operation Inform the Soldiers", an effort to send DVDs, letters, and declassified government documents to U.S. servicemembers in Iraq. Dice hoped these would prove 9/11 conspiracy theories and cause the recipients to "rethink why they’re fighting." On June 10, syndicated talk show host Michael Reagan advocated on air that Dice should be assassinated for having done so. Six days later, Reagan hosted Dice on his show and apologized for his comments.

In June 2008, Fox News called Dice a "conspiracy theorist who believes that Freemasons worship Satan and that 'the United States military has built enormous underground cities for the political elite.'"

Dice promoted the Jade Helm 15 conspiracy theories, claiming that the 2015 military exercises were preparation for a declaration of martial law in the United States.

==== Illuminati ====
Conflating celebrities with the Illuminati and Satanism, Dice called musicians Jay-Z and Beyoncé "Illuminati puppets. I call them Satanic skanks". Dice described celebrities' connection to the Illuminati as the pursuit of power via message of materialism.

Dice called Super Bowl halftime shows of the 2010s "elaborate Illuminati rituals hidden in plain sight". The Super Bowl XLVI and XLVII halftime shows allegedly featured "secret Illuminati hand signs", while musician Katy Perry—star of the Super Bowl XLIX halftime show—"promotes bisexuality and appears to be some kind of Satanic Witch". Dice published a YouTube video denouncing the Super Bowl 50 halftime show as "gay Pride propaganda". Dice noted the show featured the rainbow-colored message "believe in love" and a platform with four ramps, which Dice described as a "crucifix blasphemously placed in the centre."

=== Political commentary ===
Dice describes himself as a media analyst and author who exposes "the liberal lunatics and their manipulation of mainstream media." A false claim he made about the funeral of John Lewis was debunked by Agence France-Presse.

==== 2016 ====
Regarding the unrest after the September 2016 killing of Keith Lamont Scott, Dice decried the "black thugs who are rioting over this black thug."

In October 2016, Dice helped uncover that YouTube prankster Joey Salads had staged a YouTube video which cast opponents of Donald Trump in a negative light. Dice called the video from Salads "shameful" and posted a response video in which he showed behind-the-scenes footage from Salads that proved the video was staged. Dice also expressed concern that the video would deflect attention away from actual instances of Trump supporters being attacked, citing the firebombing of a Republican office in North Carolina as an example.

In November 2016, Dice attributed the rise of the alt-right to being "a direct consequence of social justice warriors trying to shut down conservatives on social media and ruin their careers by organizing cyber mobs to harass people's employers". He also cited opposition towards political correctness as a reason for people gravitating toward the alt-right. Also in November, after the Podesta emails were leaked, Dice noted an email from Marina Abramović to Tony Podesta and conflated the former's spiritualism with Satanism, tweeting, "I am now accepting apologies from everyone who said I was crazy for writing books about how the Establishment are Satanists".

In late 2016, Dice helped organize an unsuccessful boycott of Rogue One, a Star Wars film he called "feminist propaganda" on Twitter. Dice also encouraged his fans to boycott Grubhub in November 2016 after Grubhub's CEO Matt Maloney released a letter that was interpreted as an attack against Trump supporters.

==== 2017–2019 ====
After the Stoneman Douglas High School shooting in February 2018, Dice tweeted a distortion of the events: "Someone tell Generation Z kids that in the event of a school shooting, they should call 911 instead of posting video of it on Snapchat." Student survivors, including Sarah Chadwick, pushed back against Dice's claims; Dice deleted the post and did not respond to media inquiries thereabout. Also in February, Dice criticized the Green brothers for selling VidCon to Viacom, calling the acquisition an instance of the "YouTube community being sold out to big media again".

In May 2018, Dice defended controversial tweets made by American actor Roseanne Barr that have been perceived as being racist, saying "Time to ban monkey bars from all school playgrounds, because they’re 'racist' too, I guess."

In August 2018, after racist tweets by Sarah Jeong were published, Dice called her continued employment at The New York Times an "example […] of liberal hypocrisy".

On July 11, 2019, Dice attended the White House social media summit alongside other extremist figures.

In September 2019, Dice claimed in a tweet that "Liberals are now celebrating getting AIDS" in response to American hairstylist and television personality Jonathan Van Ness speaking about his HIV diagnosis in The Guardian and The New York Times. Dice's tweet received backlash from Twitter users, including American actress Patricia Arquette, who called Dice a "soulless skin husk" and added that "I will use this stupid and heartless tweet of yours which is devoid of any humanity and use it as a honey trap to see all the fake religious mindless people I can mute and block. Thanks for sweeping them up like trash for me into one pile."

In 2019, Dice said that his achievements were being downplayed in his Wikipedia article.

==== 2020–2022 ====
Dice spread false claims of election fraud related to the 2020 U.S. presidential election, resulting in his content on YouTube and Facebook being placed behind content warnings.

In mid-January 2021, Dice equated the storming of the United States Capitol to the Black Lives Matter protests in 2020, saying that "By BLM standards, it would be what you call a 'mostly peaceful' protest".

In February 2021, in response to Hasbro changing the Mr. Potato Head brand to be more gender-neutral, Dice made a series of tweets, including a tweet on February 25 advocating for Republican states to secede, a tweet claiming that "Mr. Potato Head has been canceled", and a tweet claiming that "Democrats believe there are dozens of genders."

In early March 2021, in response to Burger King UK tweeting "Women belong in the kitchen", Dice replied "Isn't 'Burger King' inherently sexist? Why not 'Burger Royal' for more inclusiveness?" On March 24, 2021, Dice responded to a tweet made by American filmmaker and author Michael Moore referencing the perpetrator of the Boulder shooting by telling him to "Turn off CNN." In late March 2021, Dice alleged that American podcaster Joe Rogan had "lied" about Spotify censoring Rogan's content. Dice also misattributed a quote to Rogan that was actually made by American radio host and conspiracy theorist Alex Jones in September 2020 when the Spotify censorship controversy started.

In March 2022, in response to conservative political commentator Dave Rubin announcing that he and his husband would have two children through surrogacy, Dice called it "horrifying", adding that "Any Christian or conservative congratulating them is just as bad as the Marxists."

== Publishing ==
=== Books ===
Dice has self-published a number of books. After having written The Resistance Manifesto in 2005, in which the alleged Illuminati played a minor role, Dice devoted his entire next book—2009's Illuminati: Facts and Fiction—to them. His book The Illuminati in Hollywood, explains Dice's belief that liberalism is promoted by films and television, while his 2013 self-published book Illuminati in the Music Industry alleges Rick Ross and Christina Aguilera's membership in the group. In November 2019, Dice self-published The Liberal Media Industrial Complex about social media, its political influence, and the "massive backslash from those wanting to regain the influence they once held."

- The Resistance Manifesto (2005)
- Illuminati: Facts and Fiction (2009)
- The Illuminati in Hollywood (2009)
- Illuminati in the Music Industry (2013)
- The Bilderberg Group: Facts and Fiction (2015)
- The Liberal Media Industrial Complex (2019)
- Hollywood Propaganda. How TV, Movies, and Music Shape our Culture (2020)
- The War on Conservatives (2023)

=== Videos and social media ===
In 2016, The Hollywood Reporter described Dice as "best known for his YouTube videos" and a "rising online media star who considers himself mainstream conservative but is being called alt-right by his detractors." Inspired by The Tonight Show with Jay Leno sketch "Jaywalking", Dice records videos in crowded locations where he asks passers-by to answer simple questions or to sign petitions. Dice formulated one such petition in 2013 to repeal the First Amendment to the United States Constitution; by invoking the suggestion of supporting President Obama, Dice found people in Southern California willing to sign. Dice's on-screen persona was described by a fan in The New York Times as a "goon".

In November 2019, KUSI-TV averaged Dice's daily videos as having 250,000 views and enumerated his YouTube subscribers at "more than 1.5 million".

In February 2021, Dice had more than 600,000 Twitter followers.

== Personal life ==
Dice is a member of the Republican Party. He was reported living in Vista in 2007, and in 2019 he was reported in Pacific Beach, San Diego.
