= Margaret Drye =

American politician

The Honorable Margaret Drye
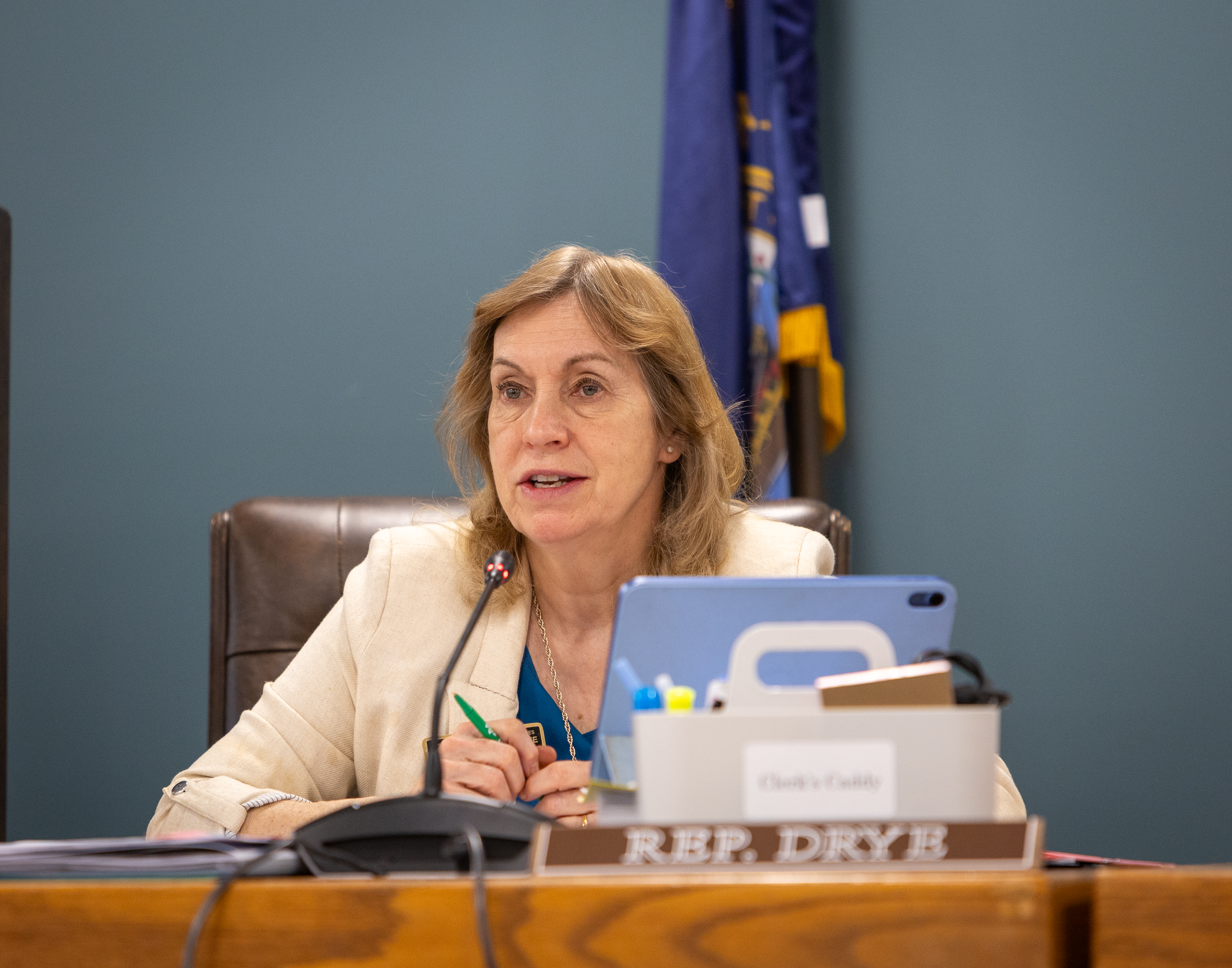
- Drye in 2026

Member of the New Hampshire House of Representatives from the Sullivan 7th district
- Incumbent
- Assumed office December 7, 2022
- Preceded by: Judy Aron
- Succeeded by: Lawrence Schissel (elect)

Personal details
- Party: Republican
- Education: Mt. Holyoke College
- Website: Official Website

Margaret Drye is an American politician. She serves as a Republican member for the Sullivan 7th district of the New Hampshire House of Representatives.

== Personal life ==
Margaret Drye lives in Plainfield, New Hampshire, where she volunteers as an EMT with the Cornish Rescue Squad. A mother of nine, Margaret taught homeschool for more than thirty years.
