= Walter Stapleton (politician) =

American politician

Walt Stapleton

Member of the New Hampshire House of Representatives from the Sullivan 5th district
- Incumbent
- Assumed office December 5, 2018
- Preceded by: Raymond Gagnon

Personal details
- Born: 1947 (age 78–79)
- Party: Republican
- Spouse: Claire
- Children: 3

Military service
- Allegiance: United States Army Transportation Corps
- Years of service: 1964

Walter A. Stapleton (born 1947) is a New Hampshire politician. A member of the Republican Party, he currently serves in the New Hampshire House of Representatives.

== Biography ==
Stapleton lived in Fairfield and then Milford, Connecticut. He enlisted in the United States Army Transportation Corps in 1964. Stapleton moved to Claremont, New Hampshire, in 1983, where he currently resides.

== Political career ==
In 2016, Stapleton ran for a seat in the New Hampshire House of Representatives that represented the Sullivan 10 district, but was defeated. Stapleton was a delegate to the Republican National Convention in 2016.

On November 6, 2018, Stapleton was elected to the New Hampshire House of Representatives where he represents the Sullivan 5 district. Stapleton assumed office on December 5, 2018. Stapleton is anti-abortion and opposes same-sex marriage.

== Personal life ==
Stapleton married Claire in 1968 in Barryville, New York. Together they have three sons. Stapleton is a member of St. Mary's Catholic Church.
