= Gary Merchant =

American politician

Member of the New Hampshire House of Representatives from the Sullivan 4 district
- Incumbent
- Assumed office December 5, 2018
- Preceded by: John J. O'Connor

Personal details
- Party: Democratic
- Education: University of New Hampshire; Northeastern University

Gary Merchant is an American politician based in New Hampshire.

== Political career ==
On November 6, 2018, Merchant was elected to the New Hampshire House of Representatives where he represents the Sullivan 4 district. Merchant assumed office on December 5, 2018. Merchant is a Democrat.

== Personal life ==
Merchant resides in Claremont, New Hampshire.
