= Andrew O'Hearne =

American politician

Member of the New Hampshire House of Representatives from the Sullivan 3rd district
- In office December 5, 2018 – December 7, 2022
- Preceded by: Francis Gauthier
- In office December 5, 2012 – December 7, 2016
- Preceded by: Spec Bowers
- Succeeded by: Francis Gauthier

Personal details
- Party: Democratic

Andrew Scott O'Hearne is a New Hampshire politician.

== Career ==
O'Hearne has worked as a police officer. On November 6, 2012, O'Hearne was elected to the New Hampshire House of Representatives where he represents the Sullivan 3 district. He served in this position until 2016. O'Hearne was once again elected to this position on November 6, 2018, and assumed the office again on December 5, 2018. O'Hearne is a Democrat. O'Hearne endorsed Pete Buttigieg in the 2020 Democratic Party presidential primaries.

== Personal life ==
O'Hearne resides in Claremont, New Hampshire.
