= Dick Magrath =

Irish rugby union player

- Full name: Richard Marshall Magrath
- Born: 21 March 1878 Cork City, Ireland
- Died: 9 October 1972 (aged 94) Ballintemple, Cork, Ireland

Rugby union career
- Position: Wing
International career
Years	Team	Apps	(Points)
1909	Ireland	1	(0)

Richard Marshall Magrath (21 March 1878 – 9 October 1972) was an Irish international rugby union player.

A native of Cork, Magrath was a founding member of Cork Constitution. He was a Munster representative player and featured in their fixture against the touring 1905 All Blacks. In 1909, Macgrath gained an Ireland cap as a wing three–quarter for a Home Nations match against Scotland at Inverleith. He became a Five Nations referee.

== See also ==
- List of Ireland national rugby union players
