= Headlines (Jay Leno) =

Leno doing Headlines on The Tonight Show in 2010

Headlines was an appropriated comedy routine developed by Jay Leno. The segment usually aired on The Tonight Show with Jay Leno Monday nights. It was first seen in 1987, when he was still a guest host on The Tonight Show Starring Johnny Carson, and continued (even after Leno became permanent host in 1992) until Jay Leno left The Tonight Show in 2014. It also aired on the prime-time spin-off The Jay Leno Show and during Leno's hosting run on You Bet Your Life in 2021. Viewers submitted newspaper headlines or other articles from all over the world, and the clippings contain either (but not limited to) a misspelled word, juxtaposed image or badly structured sentences that comically (and often in an unintentionally risqué way) completely change the meaning of what the writer intended.

== Influence ==
On December 18, 2006, an item in The Dallas Morning News about David Letterman, which included a photograph of Leno, was included on both Headlines and on Small Town News, a segment with a similar conceit on Letterman's Late Show.

In January 2010, during the replacement of O'Brien as Tonight Show host, Letterman ran a fake promo (featuring former Tonight announcer Edd Hall) for the return of Leno to The Tonight Show, referring to "Headlines" as "the bit [Leno] stole from Letterman's late-night show".

== Publications ==
Leno released several compilations of Headlines during the late 1980s and early 1990s:

- Headlines: Real but Ridiculous Headlines from America's Newspapers
- More Headlines
- Headlines III: Not The Movie, Still The Book
- Headlines IV: The Next Generation
- Jay Leno's Police Blotter: Real-Life Crime Headlines

All profits from sale of the books went to charity, most notably the Samuel Jared Kushnick Foundation.

Wil B. Strange includes "personal ads from the book 'Jay Leno's Headlines'" in an issue of Campus Life.
