= Grean =

Grean is a surname. Notable people with the surname include:

- Charles Randolph Grean (1913–2003), American composer and producer
- Doug Grean (born 1966), American record producer, audio engineer, and guitarist
