= John O'Conor (rugby union) =

Irish rugby union player

- Full name: John Hamilton O'Conor
- Born: Letterkenny, Ireland
- Died: 23 May 1953 Rathgar, Ireland

Rugby union career
- Position: Forward
International career
Years	Team	Apps	(Points)
1888–96	Ireland	17	(0)

John Hamilton O'Conor was an Irish international rugby union player.

A Bective Rangers forward, O'Conor was capped 17 times for Ireland from 1888 to 1896. He was a member of the side which won the 1894 Home Nations triple crown and held the captaincy the following season for a match against England.

O'Conor served as president of the Irish Rugby Football Union in 1911–12.

== See also ==
- List of Ireland national rugby union players
