= Judy Aron =

American politician

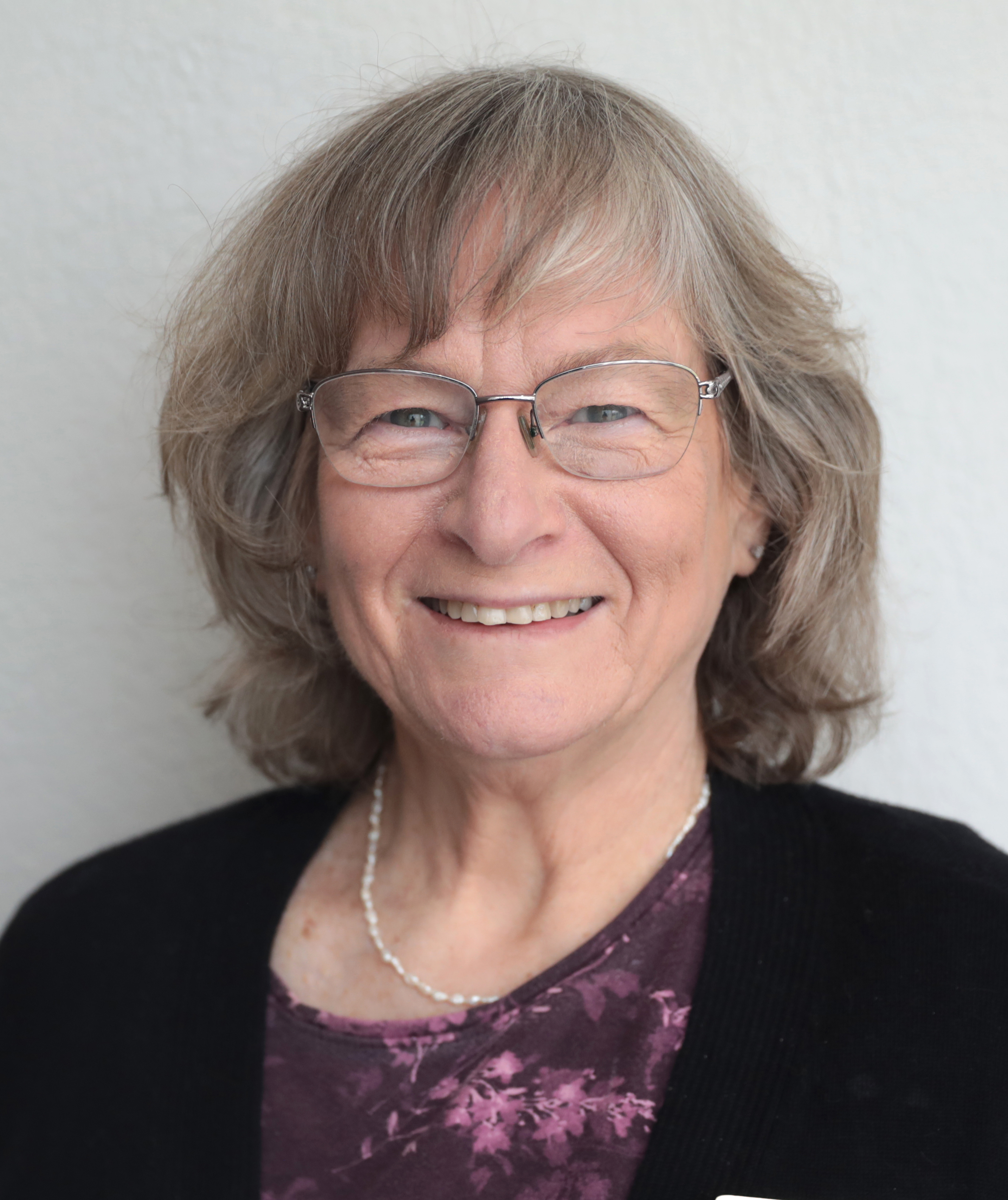
- Aron at the 2022 Hazlitt Summit hosted by Young Americans for Liberty Foundation

Member of the New Hampshire House of Representatives from the Sullivan 7th district
- Incumbent
- Assumed office December 5, 2018
- Preceded by: Jim Grenier

Member of the New Hampshire House of Representatives from the Sullivan 4th district
- Succeeded by: Ron Rule (elect)

Personal details
- Party: Republican
- Relations: Michael Aron
- Children: 3
- Education: State University of New York at New Paltz (BA)
- Website: Judy Aron

Judy Aron is an American politician who has served in the New Hampshire House of Representatives since 2018, representing the Sullivan 7th electoral district as a member of the Republican Party.

== Education ==
Aron earned a B.A. in economics from State University of New York at New Paltz.

== Career ==
On November 6, 2018, Aron was elected to the New Hampshire House of Representatives where she represents the Sullivan 7 district. Aron assumed office on December 5, 2018. Aron is a Republican.

== Personal life ==
Aron resides in South Acworth, New Hampshire. Aron is married to fellow representative Michael Aron and has three children.
