= John O'Connor (Australian cricketer) =

Australian cricketer

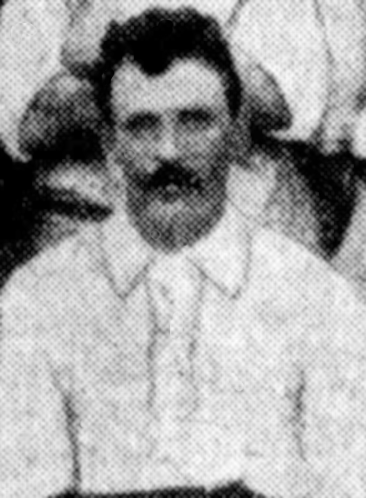

Personal information
- Born: 19 August 1868; Geelong, Victoria, Australia
- Died: 2 February 1952 (aged 83); Windsor, Victoria, Australia

Domestic team information
- Years: Team
- 1896–1897: Victoria
- Source: Cricinfo, 26 July 2015

John O'Connor (19 August 1868 – 2 February 1952) was an Australian cricketer. He played two first-class cricket matches for Victoria between 1896 and 1897.

== See also ==
- List of Victoria first-class cricketers
