= Jack O'Connor (rugby union) =

- Born: John Aloysius O'Connor; 11 October 1906 Dundas, New South Wales
- Died: c. 1980

Rugby union career
- Position: lock
International career
Years	Team	Apps	(Points)
1928	Wallabies	4	(3)

John Aloysius O'Connor (11 October 1906 – c. 1980) was a rugby union player who represented Australia.

O'Connor, a lock, was born in Dundas, New South Wales and claimed a total of 4 international rugby caps for Australia.
