= Bill Hinton =

English footballer

Personal information
- Full name: William Frederick Weston Hinton
- Date of birth: 25 December 1895
- Place of birth: Swindon, England
- Date of death: 1976 (aged 80–81)
- Height: 5 ft 9 1/2 in (1.77 m)
- Position: Goalkeeper

Senior career*
Years	Team	Apps	(Gls)
	Swindon Town	0	
1920–1923	Bolton Wanderers	34	
1924–1926	Tottenham Hotspur	57	
1928	Swindon Town	0	
- * Club domestic league appearances and goals

William Frederick Weston Hinton (25 December 1895 – 1976) was an English professional footballer who played for Swindon Town, Bolton Wanderers, Tottenham Hotspur.

== Football career ==
Hinton joined his local club Swindon Town but didn't make a first team appearance. In 1920 the goalkeeper joined Bolton Wanderers where he played in 34 matches between 1920 and 1923. Hinton signed for Tottenham Hotspur in 1924 where he featured in 64 matches in all competitions for the Lilywhites. After leaving White Hart Lane he returned to Swindon Town in 1928 where he ended his playing career.
