= Norman Parsley =

English footballer

Personal information
- Full name: Wilfred Norman Parsley
- Date of birth: 28 November 1923
- Place of birth: Shildon, England
- Date of death: 1993 (aged 69–70)
- Position: Wing half

Senior career*
Years	Team	Apps	(Gls)
–	Shildon Works		
1945–1953	Darlington	161	(14)
- * Club domestic league appearances and goals

Wilfred Norman Parsley (28 November 1923 – 1993), generally known as Norman but also as Wilf Parsley, was an English footballer who scored 14 goals from 161 appearances in the Football League playing as a wing half for Darlington.
