= William Palmer (New Hampshire politician) =

American politician

Member of the New Hampshire House of Representatives from the Sullivan 2nd district
- Incumbent
- Assumed office December 7, 2022
- Succeeded by: Jenny Ramsey (elect)

Personal details
- Party: Democratic
- Education: Columbia College of Physicians and Surgeons

William Palmer is an American politician. He serves as a Democratic member for the Sullivan 2nd district of the New Hampshire House of Representatives.

== Life and career ==
Palmer attended Columbia College of Physicians and Surgeons.

Palmer served in the Cornish School Board for eight years.

In November 2022, Palmer defeated Virginia Drye in the general election for the Sullivan 2nd district of the New Hampshire House of Representatives, winning 60 percent of the votes. He assumed office in December 2022.
