= Marie Rudisill =

American author, TV personality, aunt of Truman Capote (1911–2006)

- Born: Edna Marie Faulk; March 13, 1911; Monroeville, Alabama, US
- Died: November 3, 2006 (aged 95); Hudson, Florida, US
- Other name: Fruitcake Lady

Marie Rudisill (March 13, 1911 – November 3, 2006), also known as the Fruitcake Lady, was a writer and television personality, best known as the nonagenarian woman who appeared in the "Ask the Fruitcake Lady" segments on The Tonight Show on American television. She was an aunt to novelist Truman Capote (his mother, Lillie Mae Faulk, was her elder sister). Rudisill helped to raise Capote, who lived with her at times during his childhood, both in Alabama and New York City.

== Biography ==
Rudisill was born Edna Marie Faulk in Monroeville, Alabama. Her first marriage, to a Japanese man in the 1930s, ended in divorce due to her family's disapproval. She later wrote, "I really loved that man. He was so talented and such a sweet wonderful person. And I would have been happier with him than I was with the man I married after that." She married James Rudisill in 1939. She wrote, "A man who drinks excessively, it's not a happy marriage. We loved each other, but we had our times." The couple had one son, James, and Rudisill had three grandchildren.

Rudisill authored eight books, including Fruitcake: Memories of Truman Capote & Sook. She was a resident of Florida.

== The Tonight Show ==
Rudisill's book Fruitcake (published by Hill Street Press) led to her being invited to be a guest on The Tonight Show on December 14, 2000. During her first visit she showed Jay Leno and Tom Cruise how to make fruitcakes. This led to her being nicknamed the Fruitcake Lady and led to several more appearances on The Tonight Show, in which she instructed host Jay Leno and other guests in the preparation of various baked desserts.

In 2002, the "Ask the Fruitcake Lady" segments became a regular part of The Tonight Show. In these segments, viewers posed prerecorded questions to Rudisill (including questions of a graphic sexual nature), and her frank and often unpredictable responses were shown. She often lost patience with what she perceived as stupidity on the part of some questioners, and lapsed into profanity.

== Death ==
Marie Rudisill died in Hudson, Florida, on November 3, 2006, at the age of 95, just before the publication date of her last book, Ask the Fruitcake Lady: Everything You Would Already Know If You Had Any Sense, on November 7. The November 8 broadcast of the Tonight Show included a tribute composed of highlights from her segments on the show, including one in which she cooked with (and was hugged and kissed on the cheek by) Tom Cruise.

An updated version of her 1989 cookbook, Sook's Cookbook: Memories and Traditional Recipes from the Deep South, was published by Louisiana State University Press in September 2008.

== Bibliography ==
- Truman Capote: The Story of His Bizarre and Exotic Boyhood by an Aunt Who Helped Raise Him (1983), with James C. Simmons
- Sook's Cookbook: Memories and Traditional Recipes from the Deep South (1989); updated edition 2008
- Critter Cakes & Frog Tea: Tales and Treats from the Emerald River (1994)
- Fruitcake: Memories of Truman Capote & Sook (2000)
- The Southern Haunting of Truman Capote (2000), with James C. Simmons
- Ask the Fruitcake Lady: Everything You Would Already Know If You Had Any Sense (2006)
