= Jack O'Connor (Australian footballer) =

Australian rules footballer, born 1900

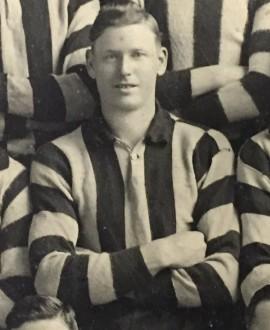
- O'Connor in 1918

Personal information
- Full name: John William O'Connor
- Born: 8 November 1900; Collingwood, Victoria
- Died: 23 February 1983 (aged 82); Heidelberg West, Victoria
- Original team: Northcote
- Height: 179 cm (5 ft 10 in)
- Weight: 74 kg (163 lb)

Playing career^{1}
Years	Club	Games (Goals)
1918	Collingwood	3 (1)
- ^{1} Playing statistics correct to the end of 1918.

John William O'Connor (8 November 1900 – 23 February 1983) was an Australian rules footballer who played with Collingwood in the Victorian Football League (VFL).
