= Frank Purser =

Irish rugby union player

Frank Purser OBE
- Full name: Francis Carmichael Purser
- Born: 16 September 1876 British India
- Died: 28 February 1934 (aged 57) County Dublin, Ireland
- School: Galway Grammar School
- University: Trinity College Dublin
- Notable relative: Sarah Purser (aunt)
- Occupation: Neurologist

Rugby union career
- Position: Three-quarter
International career
Years	Team	Apps	(Points)
1898	Ireland	3	(0)

Francis Carmichael Purser (16 September 1876 – 28 February 1934) was an Irish physician and rugby union player.

== Biography ==
Born in British India, Purser lost his mother while still a baby and was sent by his father, an Indian Civil Service official, to live with extended family in Galway. He was a nephew of the portrait artist Sarah Purser. After attending Galway Grammar School, Purser studied medicine at Trinity College Dublin and as a varsity rugby player for Dublin University was capped three times for Ireland in the 1898 Home Nations, utilised as a three-quarter.

Purser began his medical career as a pathologist and general physician, before branching out into neurology. Becoming one of Ireland's leading neurologists, Purser was an honorary professor of neurology at Trinity College Dublin. He served as president of the Royal College of Physicians of Ireland and Irish Medical Association.

== See also ==
- List of Ireland national rugby union players
