= William Coffey (cricketer) =

Irish cricketer

Personal information
- Full name: William Loftus Coffey
- Born: 7 October 1885; Dublin, Ireland
- Died: Unknown

Career statistics
Competition	First-class
Matches	1
Runs scored	4
Batting average	2.00
100s/50s	0/0
Top score	4
Balls bowled	90
Wickets	3
Bowling average	13.33
5 wickets in innings	0
10 wickets in match	0
Best bowling	3/40
Catches/stumpings	0/–
- Source: Cricinfo, 10 January 2022

William Loftus Coffey (born 7 October 1885) was an Irish cricketer. He made his debut for Ireland in a match against a team representing New York City in September 1909. Later that month, he played his second and final match for Ireland, playing a first-class match against Philadelphia, which was his only first-class match.

Coffey immigrated to the United States in 1909 and became a U.S. citizen in 1919.
