= Hope Damon =

American politician

Member of the New Hampshire House of Representatives from the Sullivan 8th district
- Incumbent
- Assumed office December 7, 2022

Personal details
- Party: Democratic

Hope Damon is an American politician. She serves as a Democratic member for the Sullivan 8th district of the New Hampshire House of Representatives.
