= John Cloutier =

American politician

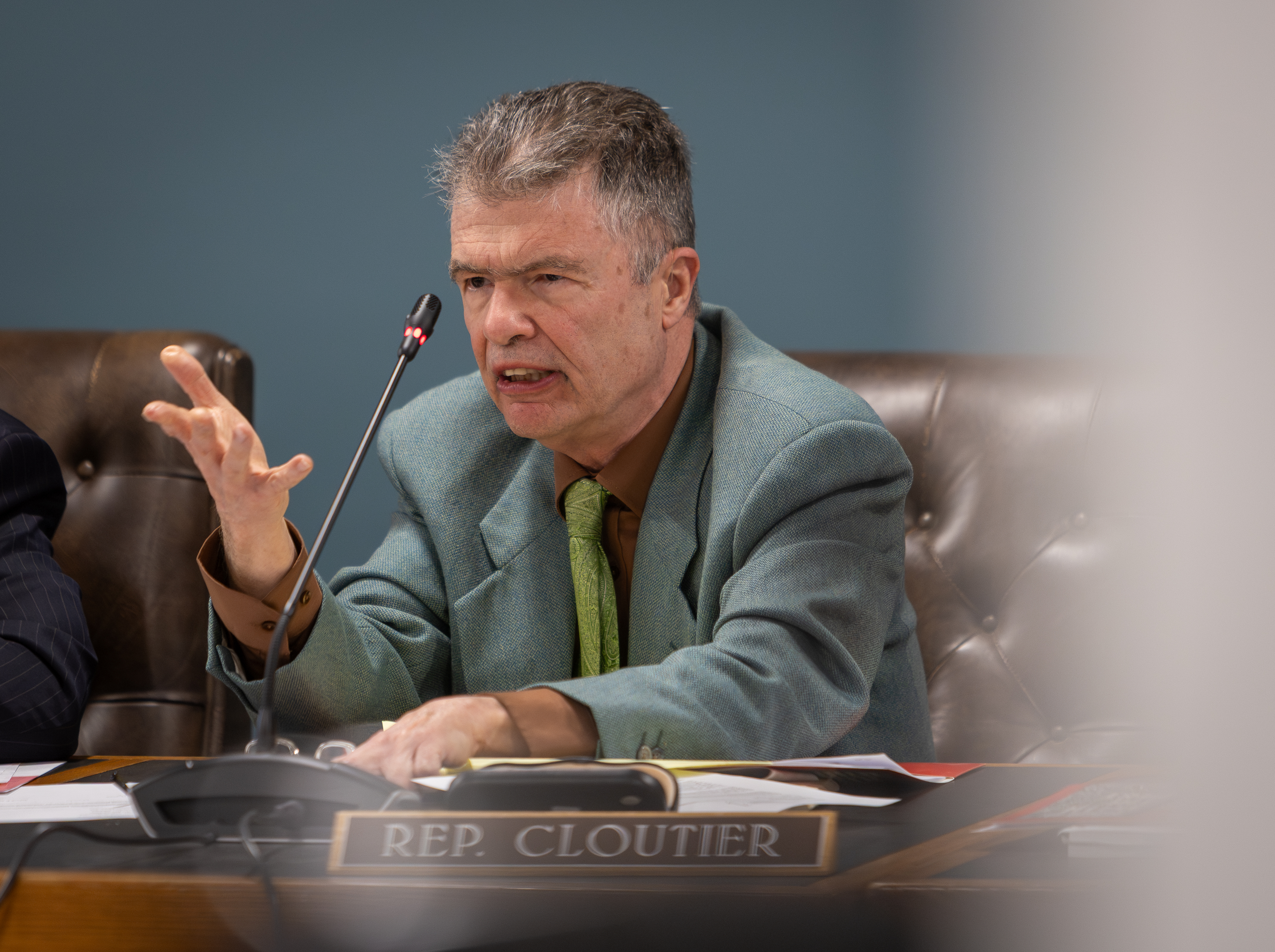
- Cloutier in 2026

Member of the New Hampshire House of Representatives from the Sullivan 6th district
- Incumbent
- Assumed office 1992

Personal details
- Born: November 15, 1957 (age 68) Claremont, New Hampshire, U.S.
- Party: Democratic
- Education: Keene State College
- Occupation: Former security officer

John R. Cloutier (born November 15, 1957) is an American politician in the state of New Hampshire. He is a member of the New Hampshire House of Representatives, sitting as a Democrat from the Sullivan 6 district, having been first elected in 1992.
