= Virginia Irwin (politician) =

American politician

Member of the New Hampshire House of Representatives for Sullivan 6
- In office 2016–2018

Member of the New Hampshire House of Representatives for Sullivan 9
- In office 2014–2016

Member of the New Hampshire House of Representatives for Sullivan 6
- In office 2012–2014

Personal details
- Party: Democratic

Virginia O'Brien Irwin is an American politician from New Hampshire. She served in the New Hampshire House of Representatives.

She was a candidate for Sullivan 3 in the 2022 New Hampshire House of Representatives election.
