= O'Connor (surname) =

List of people with the surname O'Connor

O'Connor (Irish: Ó Conchobhair) is a surname. Notable people with the surname include:

== Medieval kings ==
- Cathal Crobhdearg Ua Conchobair (1153–1224), King of Connacht
- Conchobar Máenmaige Ua Conchobhair (died 1189), last independent King of Connacht
- Ruaidhrí Ó Conchobhair (died 1198), last High King of Ireland (also known as Rory O'Connor)
- Toirdealbhach Mac Ruaidhrí Ó Conchobhair (1088–1156), High King of Ireland (also known as Turlough O'Connor)

== Arts ==
- Alexander James O'Connor, more known as Rex Orange County (born 1998), British singer-songwriter
- Brian O'Connor, American bassist
- Caroline O'Connor (born 1962), Australian singer, dancer and actress
- Carroll O'Connor (1924–2001), American actor
- Celeste O'Connor (born 1998), American actress
- Claudio O'Connor (born 1963), Argentine singer
- Denis O'Connor (New Zealand sculptor) (born 1947), New Zealand ceramicist, sculptor and writer
- Denis O'Connor (British-Irish sculptor), sculptor
- Des O'Connor (1932–2020), British singer and TV comedian
- Donald O'Connor (1925–2003), American actor and entertainer
- Elmo O'Connor (born 1994), American rapper and singer known as BONES, founder of TeamSESH.
- Ella Marija Lani Yelich-O'Connor, more known as Lorde (born 1996), New Zealand singer-songwriter
- Flannery O'Connor (1925–1964), American author
- Frank O'Connor (1903–1966), Irish author
- Frank O'Connor (1881–1959), American actor, director, and screenwriter
- Gavin O'Connor (born 1963), American film director, screenwriter, producer, playwright and actor
- Gavin O'Connor (born 1972), Irish actor
- Hazel O'Connor (born 1955), English singer and actress
- James O'Connor, American drummer
- Joe O'Connor, American actor
- Josef O'Connor (born 1990), artist
- Joseph O'Connor (born 1963), Irish novelist
- Josh O'Connor (born 1990), British actor
- Margaret O'Connor (milliner) (born 1986), Irish milliner
- Mark O'Connor (born 1961), American fiddler
- Raymond O'Connor (died 2023), American character actor
- Renee O'Connor (born 1971), American actress
- Ruairi O'Connor (born 1991), Irish actor
- Simon O'Connor (born 1949), New Zealand actor and playwright
- Sinéad O'Connor (1966–2023), Irish singer-songwriter
- Una O'Connor (1880–1959), Irish character actress
- O'Connor, Argentinian band

== Law and politics ==
- Alexander O'Connor, Fijian politician
- Arthur O'Connor (1763–1852), United Irishman and later a general in Napoleon's army
- Basil O'Connor (1892–1972), American lawyer, co-founded National Foundation for Infantile Paralysis with Franklin D. Roosevelt
- Batt O'Connor, Irish builder, who worked for the revolutionary Michael Collins
- Bob O'Connor (mayor) (1944–2006), Mayor of Pittsburgh, Pennsylvania
- David J. O'Connor (1924–2011), American politician
- Dennis O'Connor, Associate Chief Justice of Ontario
- Edmund O'Connor (1848–1898), President pro tem of the NY State Senate 1895
- Feargus O'Connor (1794–1855), Irish Chartist leader
- Frank O'Connor (1903–1966), Canadian politician
- Frank D. O'Connor (1909–1992), New York politician
- Gavan O'Connor (born 1947), Australian politician
- Gordon O'Connor (born 1939), Canadian politician
- James O'Connor (1870–1941), American politician
- Jeremiah F. O'Connor (1933–2010), American politician
- Jerry L. O'Connor (born 1953), American politician
- John O'Connor (1824–1887), Canadian politician
- Joseph O'Connor, Irish author
- Joseph O'Connor, Irish revolutionary, soldier and politician
- Joseph O'Conor (1916–2001), Irish actor
- Judith G. O'Connor (born 1936), American politician
- Justice O'Connor (disambiguation), various people
- Sir Kenneth O'Connor (1896–1985), British Judge
- Larry O'Connor (born 1956), Canadian politician
- Máireag Bean Uí Conchobhair Fáilghe (died 1451), Irish noblewoman
- Maureen O'Connor (judge) (born 1951), Lieutenant Governor of Ohio and member of the Ohio Supreme Court
- Maureen O'Connor (born 1946), mayor of San Diego, California, from 1985 to 1992
- Matt O'Connor, founder of the fathers' rights pressure group Fathers 4 Justice
- Michael O'Connor (1865–1940), Australian politician
- Nicholas O'Connor (born 1945), Irish politician
- Nicholas R. O'Connor (1849–1920), American politician from New York
- Patrick J. O'Connor, Chicago alderman
- Ray O'Connor (1926–2013), 22nd Premier of Western Australia, convicted fraudster and Australian rules footballer
- Richard O'Connor (1851–1912), Australian politician and jurist
- Sandra Day O'Connor (1930–2023), Associate Justice of the United States Supreme Court
- T.P. O'Connor (1848–1929), Irish journalist and politician
- Terence O'Connor (1891–1940), British politician

== Military ==
- Bryan D. O'Connor (born 1946), astronaut
- Francis Burdett O'Connor was an officer in the Irish Legion of Simón Bolívar's army in Venezuela.
- Luke O'Connor (1831–1915), first recipient of the Victoria Cross and British General
- Sir Richard O'Connor (1889–1981), British Army general
- Rory O'Connor, Irish revolutionary soldier, who commanded Four Courts garrison

== Religion ==
- Alex O'Connor (born 1999), English broadcaster and podcaster on themes of religion
- Denis T. O'Connor (1841–1911), Roman Catholic Archbishop of Toronto
- James O'Connor (bishop) (1823–1891), Bishop of the Roman Catholic Diocese of Omaha
- John O'Connor (cardinal) (1920–1999), Roman Catholic Archbishop of New York City
- Michael O'Connor, Bishop of the Roman Catholic Diocese of Pittsburgh
- Patrick Edward O'Connor (1932–2014), New Zealand Roman Catholic priest
- William Patrick O'Connor, Bishop of the Roman Catholic Diocese of Superior (1942–1946)

== Science and academia ==
- Annette O'Connor, professor and researcher in health care
- C. Y. O'Connor (1843–1902), Irish engineer
- David O'Connor, Australian Egyptologist
- J. Dennis O'Connor, American academic administrator
- Johnson O'Connor (1891–1973), American psychometrician
- Joseph Desmond O'Connor (1919–1998), British linguist
- Michael Patrick O'Connor (1950–2007), American linguist
- Thomas H. O'Connor (1923–2012), American historian

== Sport ==
- Adrian O'Connor (born 1978), Irish backstroke swimmer
- Brian O'Connor, University of Virginia baseball head coach
- Christy O'Connor Jnr (1948–2016), Irish golfer
- Christy O'Connor Snr (1924–2016), Irish golfer; uncle of Christy Jnr
- Cian O'Connor (born 1979), Irish equestrian
- Dan O'Connor (baseball) (1868–1942), Canadian baseball player
- D'Arcy O'Connor (1994), English footballer
- David O'Connor (equestrian) (born 1962), American equestrian
- Denise O'Connor (born 1935), American Olympic fencer
- Donncha O'Connor (born 1981), Cork All Ireland Senior Medalist
- Drew O'Connor (born 1998), American ice hockey player
- Fred O'Connor (born 1939), American football player
- Fred O'Connor (soccer) (1902–1952), American soccer player
- Gary O'Connor (born 1974), Scottish football goalkeeper
- Garry O'Connor (born 1983), Scottish footballer (Hibernian, Lokomotiv Moscow, Birmingham City, Scotland)
- Georgia O'Connor (2000–2025), English boxer
- James O'Connor (rugby) (born 1990), Australian rugby union player
- Jamesie O'Connor (born 1971), Irish hurler
- Jennifer O'Connor (netball) (born 1984), Australian netball player
- Joe O'Connor (born 1995), English snooker player
- Karen O'Connor (born 1958), American equestrian
- Kieran O'Connor (1979–2020), Gaelic footballer
- Leah O'Connor (born 1992), American steeplechase runner
- Logan O'Connor, Canadian ice hockey player
- Mary O'Connor (athlete) (born 1955), New Zealand long-distance runner
- Michael O'Connor (baseball player) (born 1980), Major League Baseball player
- Michael O'Connor (rugby) (born 1960), Australian rugby union and rugby league player
- Patrick O'Connor, Jamaican sprinter
- Pat O'Connor (American football) (born 1993), American football player
- Pat O'Connor (racing driver) (1928–1958), Formula One driver
- Paul O'Connor, Irish Gaelic footballer
- Paul O'Connor, Irish skier
- Peter O'Connor (athlete) (1872–1957), Irish athlete
- Red O'Connor, American football player
- Ryan O'Connor (born 1992), Canadian ice hockey player
- Tomás O'Connor (born 2004), Argentine footballer
- Tommy O'Connor, Irish footballer
- Tony O'Connor, Irish rower
- William Joseph O'Connor (1862–1892), Canadian professional oarsman

== Other ==
- Brendan O'Connor, multiple people
- Daniel O'Connor, multiple people
- Erin O'Connor (born 1978), British supermodel
- Francis V. O'Connor (1937–2017), American art historian
- Kevin O'Connor, multiple people
- Liam O'Connor, multiple people
- Michael O'Connor (disambiguation), multiple people
- Patricia O'Connor, multiple people
- Terry O'Connor, multiple people
- Thomas Burton O'Connor (1914–1952), American journalist & editor
- Tom O'Connor, multiple people
- Tony O'Connor, headteacher

== Fictional characters ==
- O'Connor, the name of O'Brien in the 1956 film adaptation of Nineteen Eighty-Four
- Enoch O'Connor, the name of a side character in Ransom Rigg's book series 'Miss Peregrine's Home For Peculiar Children' who possesses the ability to resurrect the dead via inanimate objects.

== Similar names ==
- O'Conner
- Conner (surname)
- Connor (surname)
- Connors (surname)
- Conor
- O'Conor Don
- O Connor Sligo
