= Connor (surname) =

Origin
- Region of origin: Ireland

Other names
- Variant forms: O'Connor, Konnor, MacConnor, McConnor, Connors

Connor, (from Conchobar, is an Irish name meaning "Wolf Kin", "Lover of Wolves" or "Lover of Hounds")

== Clans and family names ==
- O'Connor (surname) (kin of Connor), of Irish origin mostly found in Ireland.
- MacConnor or McConnor comes from Irish Mac Conchobhair, son of Conchobhair

== Notable people ==
- Bob Connor (1922−2002), English professional footballer
- Bob Connor (politician) (1938–1997), American politician
- Bull Connor (1897–1973), American police official and segregationist
- Connie Yerwood Connor (1908–1991), Texas physician
- Dorinda Connor (1947–2024), American politician
- Dutch Connor (1895–1978), American football player and coach
- Evelyn Connor, American politician
- Gary Connor (born 1972), American politician
- George Connor (American football) (1925–2003), American football player
- George Connor (racing driver) (1906–2001), American racecar driver
- Geraldine Connor (1952–2011), British ethnomusicologist, theatre director, composer and performer
- Henry Connor (disambiguation), several people
- Jack Connor (footballer, born 1911) (1911–1994), Scottish footballer
- Jack Connor (footballer, born 1934) (1934–2010), English footballer
- Jake Connor (born 1994), English rugby player
- Jimmy Connor (footballer, born 1881), Scottish footballer
- Jimmy Connor (footballer, born 1909) (1909–1980), Scottish footballer
- Joe Connor (disambiguation), several people
- John Connor (disambiguation), several people
- Kenneth Connor (1918–1993), English actor
- Kevin Connor (artist) (1932–2025), Australian artist
- Kevin Connor (director) (born 1937), film and TV director
- Kimberly Connor (born 1980), American boxer and mixed martial artist
- Kit Connor (born 2004), English actor
- Kyle Connor (born 1996), American ice hockey player
- Laura Connor, British ballet dancer
- Mark Connor (born 1949), American baseball coach
- Patrick Edward Connor (1820–1891), 19th-century American general
- Pearl Connor (1924–2005), Trinidadian theatrical and literary agent, actress and cultural activist
- Roger Connor (1857–1931), American baseball player, hall of fame inductee
- Roger G. Connor (1926–1999), American jurist
- Rose Connor (1892–1970), American architect
- Sarah Connor (singer) (born 1980), German singer
- Seldon Connor (1839–1917), American soldier
- Steven Connor (born 1955), English writer, professor and cultural critic
- William D. Connor (1864–1944), Canadian-born American politician, lieutenant governor of Wisconsin

== Fictional characters ==
- Aidan Connor, a character from Coronation Street
- Carla Connor, a character from Coronation Street
- Jenny Connor, a character from Coronation Street
- Johnny Connor, a character from Coronation Street
- John Connor, protagonist in the Terminator franchise
- Kate Connor, a character from Coronation Street
- Liam Connor, a character from Coronation Street
- Maria Connor, a character from Coronation Street
- Michelle Connor, a character from Coronation Street
- Paul Connor, a character from Coronation Street
- Ryan Connor, a character from Coronation Street
- Sarah Connor (Terminator), mother of John Connor

== See also ==
- Connor (given name)
- Conner (surname)
- Connors (surname)
- Connor (disambiguation)
- O'Conor
