= Conner (surname) =

- Albert Clinton Conner, American painter
- Alexander H. Conner, American politician
- Amanda Conner, American comic artist
- Angela Conner, English sculptor
- Bart Conner, retired American Olympian
- Bruce Conner (1933–2008), American artist
- Chamarri Conner (born 2000), American football player
- Charles Franklin Conner, former United States Deputy Secretary of Agriculture
- Charles Fremont Conner, American artist
- Chris Conner (born 1983), American ice hockey player
- Christopher C. Conner, Chief Judge of the United States District Court for the Middle District of Pennsylvania
- Clyde Conner, American football wide receiver
- Clyde R. Conner, American college football player
- Darion Conner, American former linebacker convicted of vehicular homicide
- David Conner, several people
- Dennis Conner (born 1942), American yachtsman
- Dick Conner, English football player
- Doyle Conner (1928–2012), American politician
- Eliza Archard Conner (pen name, "Zig"; 1838–1912), American journalist
- Elizabeth Marney Conner (1856–?), American educator
- Finis Conner, American entrepreneur
- Fox Conner (1874–1951), United States Army Major General in World War I
- Frank Conner (golfer), American pro golfer
- Garlin Murl Conner (1919–1998), United States Army lieutenant
- Gary Lee Conner, American guitarist
- Hayden Conner (born 2002), American football player
- J. W. Conner, Wisconsin State Assembly
- Jack Conner (footballer, born 1891) (1891–?), Scottish footballer
- Jack Conner (footballer, born 1898) (1898–1967), Scottish footballer
- James Conner (disambiguation), multiple people
- Jean Conner, American artist
- Jimmy Dan Conner, American basketball shooting guard
- John Conner (disambiguation), multiple people
- Kavell Conner, Canadian linebacker
- Keven Conner (c. 1974–2003), American R&B singer, member of the band H-Town
- Keyanna Conner, American politician
- Lester Conner, American basketball coach
- Lois Conner, American photographer
- Lycurgus Conner, American politician
- Mac Conner, American commercial illustrator and centenarian
- Madison Conner (born 2003), American basketball player
- Martin Sennet Conner, governor of Mississippi from 1932 to 1936
- Maurice Conner, Canadian politician
- Mekinges Conner, Native American woman and wife of William Conner
- Michael Conner, American science fiction writer
- Monte Conner, former Senior Vice President of A&R for Roadrunner Records
- Mountifort Conner ( –1880) politician in South Australia, sporting journalist in Victoria and NSW
- Nadine Conner, American singer
- Pierre Conner (1932–2018), American mathematician
- Raymond Conner, American businessman
- Richard Conner, Union Army soldier and Medal of Honor recipient
- Seth Conner (born 1992), American baseball coach
- Snoop Conner (born 2000), American football player
- Stanley Conner, American college football coach
- Tamlin Conner, American–New Zealand psychologist
- Tanner Conner (born 1998), American football player
- Tara Conner (born 1985), Miss USA 2006
- Van Conner (1967–2023), American musician, member of Screaming Trees
- Varise Conner, American fiddler
- Walter Thomas Conner (1877–1952), Baptist theologian
- William Conner, American trader and interpreter
- William C. Conner, American federal judge
- W. W. Conner, American politician

Fictional characters:

- The Conners, fictional family in the American television series Roseanne and its spinoff

== See also ==
- Conner (given name)
- Conners, surname
- Connor (surname)
- O'Conner
