= Conchobar =

Conchobar (Old Irish pronunciation: [ˈkonxoβaɾ]) is an old and famous Irish male name meaning "lover of canines". It is the source of the Irish names Conor, Connor, Connors, Conner, O'Connor, etc. It is a name borne by several figures from Irish history and legend, including:

- Conchobar mac Nessa, legendary king of Ulster
- Conchobar Abradruad, legendary High King of Ireland of the 1st century BC
- Conchobar mac Donnchada, High King of Ireland 819–833
- Conchobar Maenmaige Ua Conchobair, 12th-century king of Connacht
- Conchobar MacDermot, king of Moylurg 1187–1196
- Conchobur Mac Cathmhail (died 1252) royal chief of Cenel Feradhaigh and of many territories besides
- Conchobar mac Tadg, king of Connacht 967–973 and eponym of the O'Conor family
- Conchobar 'Buidhe' Mág Tighearnán (anglicised Conor 'The Tawny' McKiernan) was chief of the McKiernan Clan of Tullyhunco, County Cavan from 1312 until 1314

== See also ==
- List of Irish-language given names
