= James Conner =

James Conner may refer to:

- James Perry Conner (1851–1924), U.S. Representative from Iowa
- James Conner (general) (1829–1883), Confederate general in the American Civil War
- James Conner (American football) (born 1995), American football player

== See also ==
- James Connor (disambiguation)
- James Connors (disambiguation)
- James O'Connor (disambiguation)
- Jimmy Connor (disambiguation)
- Connor James (disambiguation)
