= Connes =

Connes is a surname. Notable people with the surname include:

- Alain Connes (born 1947), French mathematician
- Janine Connes (1926–2024), French astronomer

== See also ==
- Conner (surname)
