= James O'Connor =

James O'Connor or O'Conner may refer to:

== Politics and law ==
- James O'Connor (Louisiana politician) (1870–1941), U.S Representative from Louisiana
- James F. O'Connor (1878–1945), U.S Representative from Montana
- James Francis Thaddeus O'Connor (1886–1949), U.S. federal judge
- James O'Connor (Cork politician) (born 1997), Irish Fianna Fáil politician for Cork East
- James O'Connor (Wicklow politician) (1836–1910), MP for the constituency of West Wicklow 1892–1910
- James O'Connor (Irish judge) (1872–1931), Attorney General for Ireland
- James L. O'Connor (1858–1931), Wisconsin Attorney General
- James O'Connor (Arizona politician) (born 1946), American politician
- James K. O'Connor (1864–?), American politician

== Sports ==
- Jimmy O'Connor (footballer, born 1951) (James Kelly O'Connor, born 1951), Scottish footballer, see List of Bury F.C. players (1–24 appearances)
- James O'Connor (footballer, born 1979), former Irish soccer player, former head coach of Orlando City SC
- James O'Connor (footballer, born 1984), English football player for Kidderminster Harriers
- James O'Connor (rugby union) (born 1990), Australian rugby union player
- Jamesie O'Connor (born 1972), Irish hurler
- James O'Connor (hurler), Irish hurling manager and former player

== Other ==
- James Arthur O'Connor (1792–1841), Irish painter
- James O'Connor (bishop) (1823–1890), Irish-American Roman Catholic bishop of Omaha
- James F. O'Conner (1861–1940), United States Navy sailor and Medal of Honor recipient
- James O'Connor (academic) (1930–2017), American sociologist and economist
- James O'Connor (drummer), American drummer with the band Godhead
- James P. O'Connor, Irish entomologist

== See also ==
- Jimmy O'Connor (born c. 1948), Irish footballer
- Jimmy O'Connor (author) (1918–2001), journalist and television dramatist
- Connor (disambiguation)
