= Halting site =

Types of populated places used by Irish Travellers

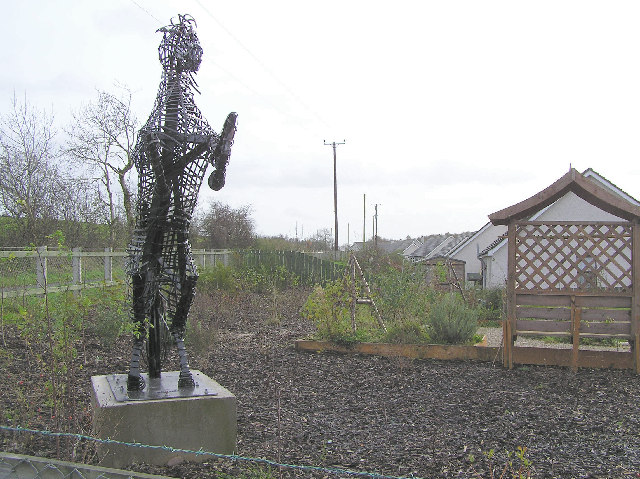
A traveller Pride sculpture. This effigy of a horse rearing up is at Tattykeel group housing scheme outside Omagh in county Tyrone.

A halting site (or a halting bay site) is purpose-built residential accommodation for Travellers provided by a local municipal authority. The halting site has an individual bay for each family unit with a full range of services provided in a small structure on each bay.

== Provision by local authorities ==
=== Accommodation for Travellers in Ireland ===
Irish state policy for providing housing for the Travelling community is laid out in legislation, the most recent being the 1998 Housing (Traveller Accommodation) Act. This law outlines the 5-year rolling accommodation programmes required of each municipal authority to meet the existing and projected accommodation needs of Travellers in their areas.

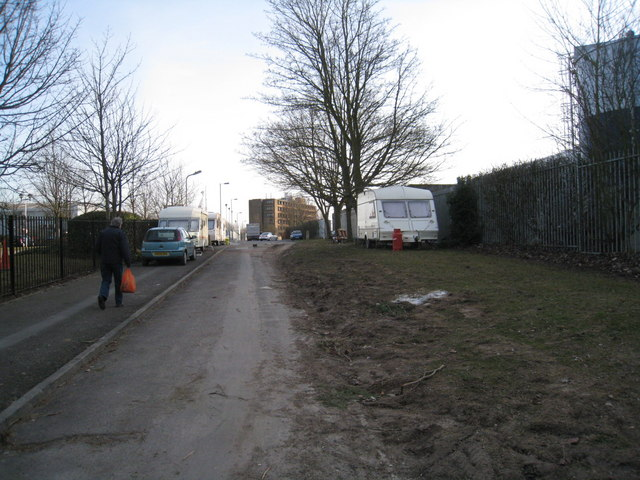
An unauthorised encampment on public land

A minority of Travellers reside on halting sites. Of the 30,987 Traveller individuals recorded as living in the Republic of Ireland in Census 2016, approximately 950 families live on halting sites.

Other accommodation types for Travellers can include:

- Standard Local Authority Social Housing
- Traveller Group Housing
- RAS (abbrev for Rental Accommodation Scheme) & Leasing
- HAP (abbrev for Housing Assistance Payment)
- Voluntary Housing
- Rural Dwellings (not applicable in cities)
- Private Rented Accommodation

A halting site should not be confused with an encampment set up on private or public land (including highway verges and lay-bys) without the consent of the landowner.

Due to these being unauthorised the people residing there are liable to eviction. These lack facilities and are referred to in official documents as "Temporary Dwellings". The provisions set out in the 1998 Housing (Traveller Accommodation) Act contain strong powers for local authorities to deal with unauthorised temporary dwellings. There are penalties used to deal with illegal encampments, as outlined in relevant legislation.

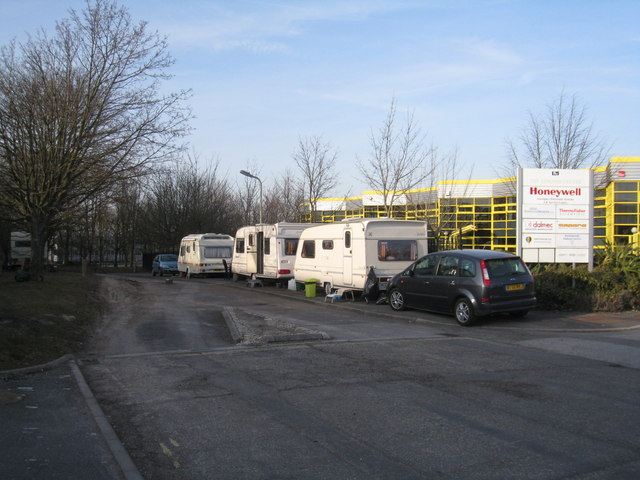
An encampment on a highway verge

These laws include:

- Local Government (Sanitary Services) Act 1948
- Planning and Development Acts 2000–2006
- Section 10 of the Housing (Miscellaneous Provisions) Act, 1992 as amended by Section 32 of the Housing (Traveller Accommodation) Act, 1998
- Roads Act, 1993
- Criminal Justice (Public Order) Act, 1994 (as amended)
- Housing (Miscellaneous Provisions) Act, 2002

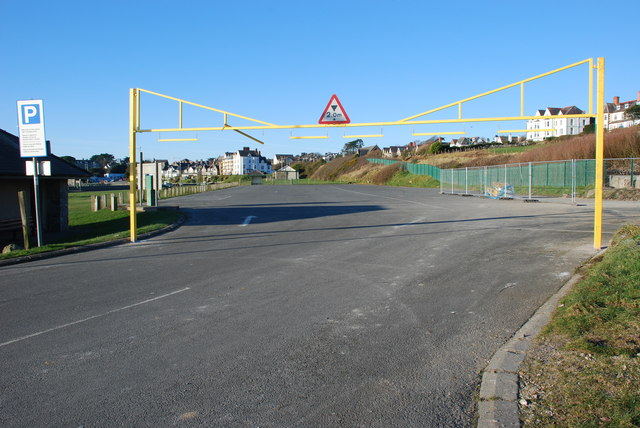
Height restriction barricade to prevent encampments on public land

The Housing Department in the Local Authority of each county implements the Traveller Accommodation Programme. This Traveller Accommodation Programme is determined by assessment of need in the local government's administrative area, in accordance with the terms of the 1998 Act. Local authorities calculate the accommodation needs of Traveller households who are approved applicants for accommodation. This involves a census of the number of Travellers residing in the county towards the end of the calendar year. The assessment is done in consultation with the Travelling Community, Travellers’ Organisations, the Local Traveller Accommodation Consultative Committee, Public Representatives, the wider community and other Statutory and Voluntary Bodies.

Regarding halting site size, case studies showed that the range should be between five and fifteen bays but consensus rests on the number of ten. The conclusion was drawn that sites that are smaller than ten bays can create difficulties in the provision of onsite services (such as community centres and pre-school facilities) because of the economies of scale involved.

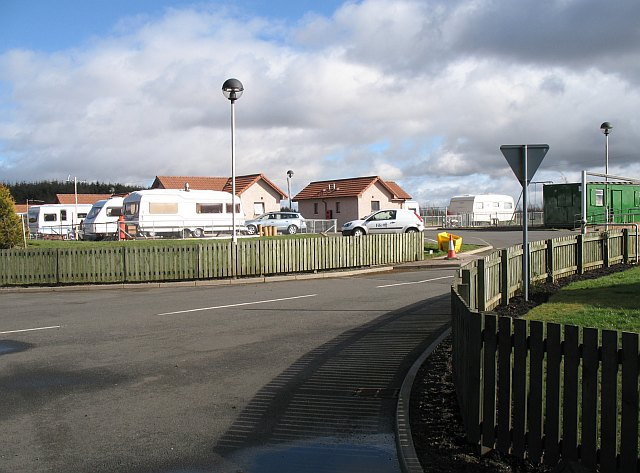
Size is an important factor in a halting site.

=== Accommodation provision in consultation ===
A big change to relations between the Traveling Community and the settled community is how the state has committed to working with Travellers. This is seen in County Councils and other relevant agencies delivering accommodation in consultation with members of the Travelling Community. The 1998 Act has provisions to allow for consultation by the County Council with the Travelling Community. The local authority Traveller Accommodation Programmes sets out to enable Traveller ownership of and pride in the programme itself. This is accomplished by Traveller participation in the structures, processes, and associations that play a role in managing housing and accommodation provided.

The Local Traveller Accommodation Consultative Committees (LTACC) was established to facilitate consultation between Housing Authorities and Travellers. Membership of the LTACC provides for a number of Traveller positions depending on the size of the population. The committee gives advice on the provision and management of accommodation for Travellers.

The ongoing implementation of the accommodation programme requires a commitment from all involved to work together. But the process of enabling partnership takes time. There was a consensus among Travellers consulted that Travellers are conceived of as a problem within the local authority. At the same time there are cases of County Council officials expressing exasperation. There have been frustrated attempts to "identify and resolve" issues arising from "vandalism, malicious damage and anti-social behavior" on halting sites. There have been cases of the inoperability of the Local Traveller Accommodation Consultative Committee (LTACC) because of a lack of interest from Traveller representatives.

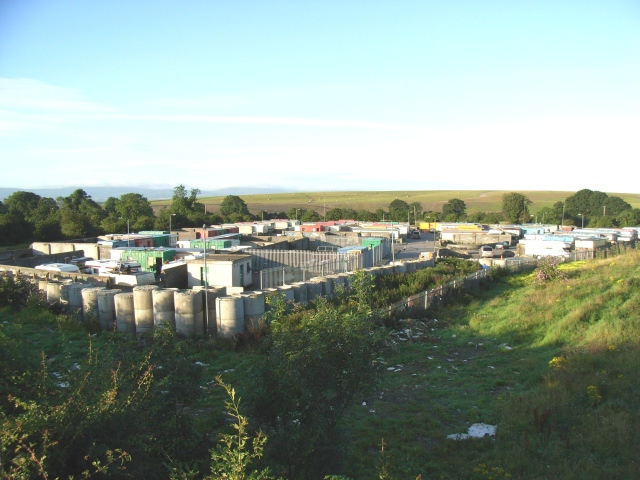
A halting site on Cappagh Road, Finglas

The 1998 Act has built-in procedures to facilitate the statutory obligation on local authorities to provide accommodation for Travellers. Firstly, there is central involvement from the Department of Local Government. The funding of the Traveller Accommodation Programme is not included in general funding to County Councils. The funds for this particular programme are received direct from the Department of Local Government. This is done so as to prevent any conflict of interest regarding funding within the County Councils. Failure by a County Council to comply with the provisions of the 1998 Act results in that funding being withheld by the Department of Local Government

Senior County Council officials have strong powers if Traveller Accommodation measures cannot achieve agreement among councilors. Lobbying over many years by Travellers’ organisations resulted in these emergency powers being invested in senior municipal officials. This is warranted by the presence of some public representatives who have repeatedly objected to halting sites.

All tenants of official halting sites (and group housing schemes) are required to sign a licence agreement (or a tenancy agreement) prior to taking up occupation of Traveller accommodation. The terms and conditions are explained in detail to every new tenant. Management plans that are set up in co-operation with Traveller families rely in the first instance on the residents and their behaviour. Local authority is legally compelled to investigate complaints of anti-social behaviour and breaches of the Tenancy Agreement. Following this appropriate action is taken which can include issuing tenancy warnings or instigating Possession Proceedings or Excluding Order Proceedings as appropriate.

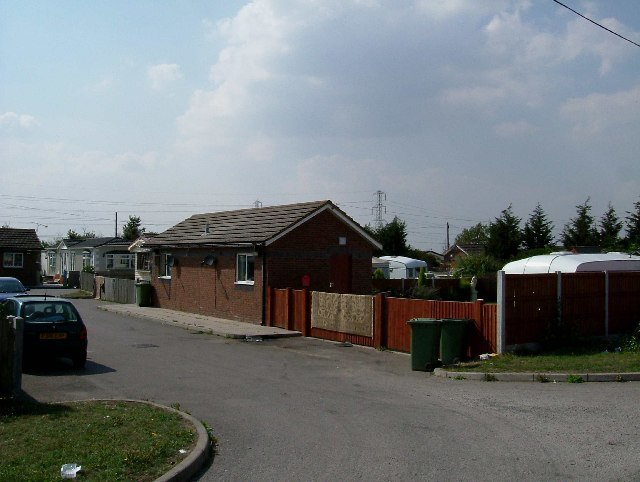
Traveller Accommodation is Provision in Consultation with Travellers

County Councils encourage tenant participation in the management and maintenance of Traveller accommodation in halting sites. This extends to maintenance of safety standards. County Councils have a statutory responsibility to ensure appropriate fire safety standards at all Local Authority housing units, which includes halting sites. To accomplish this, the maintaining of fire safety is a shared responsibility of both the county council and its tenants. The presence of unauthorised dwellings, contributing to overcrowding on halting sites, is an ongoing serious concern for fire safety.

== History ==
=== Introduction ===
Historically, many Travellers resided in temporary camping sites located on roadsides.

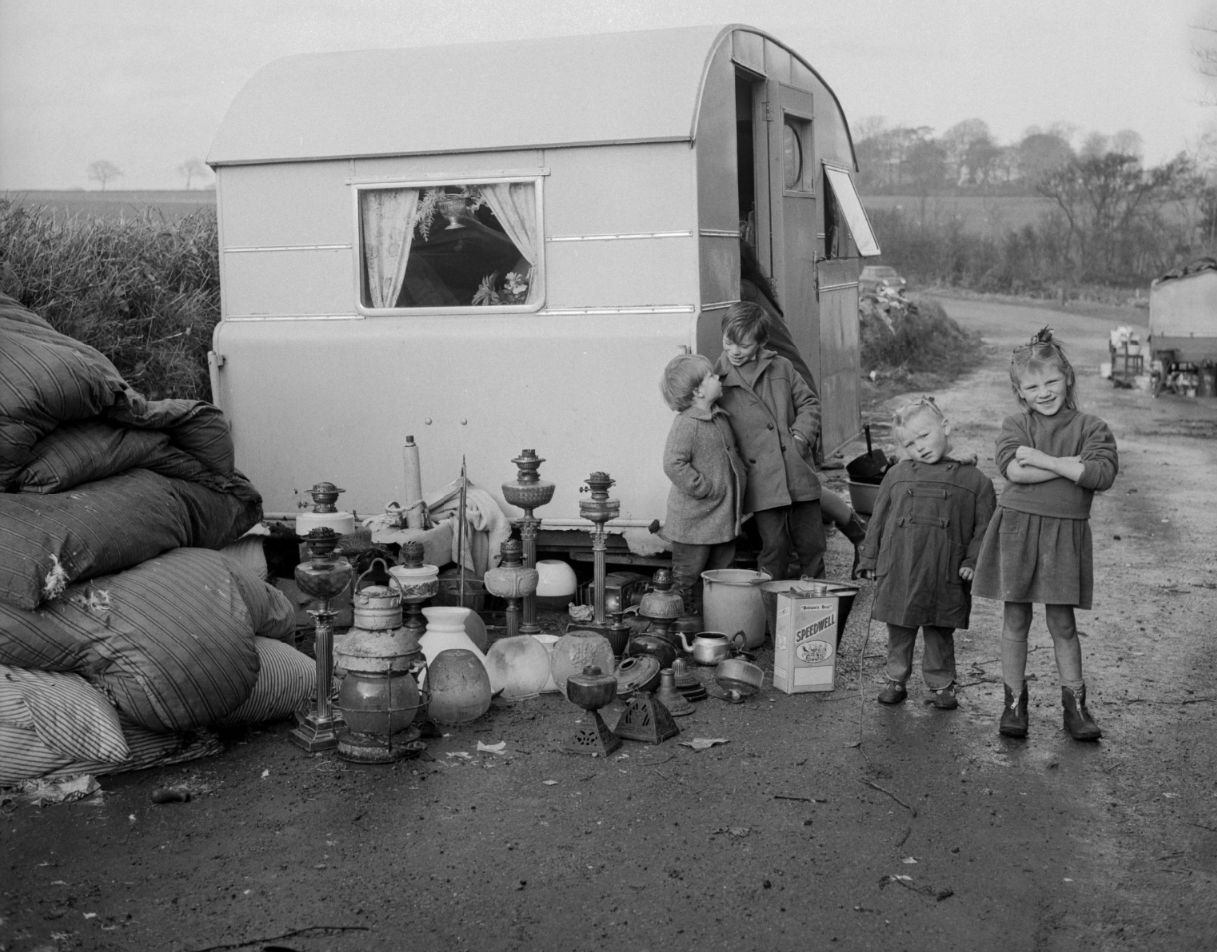
Life on the road for Irish Travellers in the 1960s

These sites were often set up on land where ownership was unclear. This could be a section of a road that had been widened or straightened. Undeveloped building sites in urban or suburban areas were also used.

The findings of a report commissioned by the Scottish Office in 1917 sheds some light on the direction officials in this part of Europe were going regarding consideration of accommodation for traditionally travelling groups. The 1917 Departmental Committee on Tinkers in Scotland identified that municipal provision of camp facilities would enable children to participate in education on a regular basis. None of the recommendations in the Scottish report were put into effect there.

=== Kent County pilot Authorised Caravan Park ===
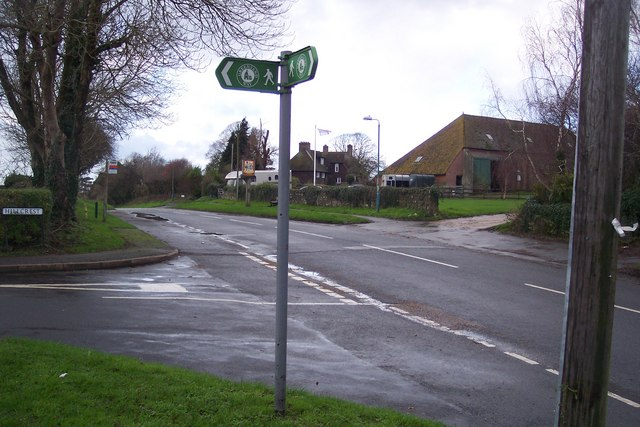
Chart Road, Great Chart village, outside Ashford, Kent

The first Traveller caravan park resembling what today is called a halting site was in Kent in England. It mainly came about as a result of changes in social policy in Britain. The 1942 report Social Insurance and Allied Services , also known as the Beveridge Report, served as the basis for the post-World War II welfare state put in place by the Labour government elected in 1945. The Beveridge Report identified five "Giant Evils" in society: squalor, ignorance, want, idleness and disease.

A pilot scheme was introduced in Kent County in 1951 to provide a planned and equipped area for gypsies and travellers to reside instead of the unsuitable winter camping sites used previously. The site, called Chilmington Gypsy and Traveller Site, was developed approximately a mile from the village of Great Chart, which is located 2 miles (3.2 km) from the town of Ashford in Kent.

The features of Chilmington Site included

- Electricity
- Halting bays for 12 caravans
- Supply of clean, potable water piped in from the mains
- Toilets and bathing facilities for each family unit
- An area of pasture and stables for horses
- Storage sheds
- Parking area for motorised vehicles
- Drainage infrastructure, to prevent accumulation of surface runoff
- Sanitary plumbing for controlled expulsion of effluent waste from the residences and the stables
- Tarmacadamed and concrete surfaces
- Security in the form of a stout perimeter fence ensuring access and exit was contained to one point
- One of the residents was appointed as caretaker of the site

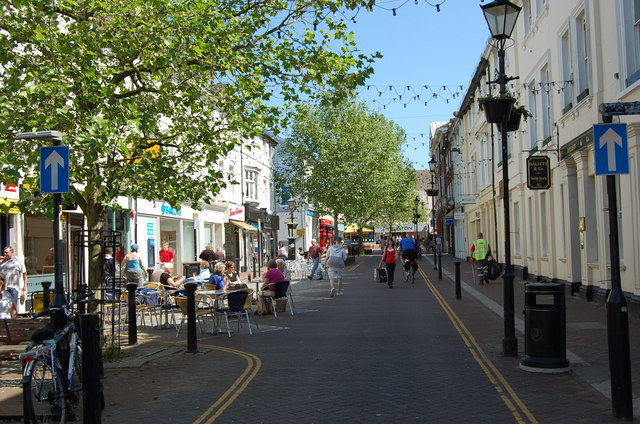
Bank Street, Ashford, Kent

On conclusion of the Chilmington Site pilot scheme the British Ministry of Housing and Local Government adopted as policy the construction of purpose-build Gypsy and Traveller Sites in every municipal area in the country. The policy was promoted as an alternative to the ad hoc approach used hitherto of officials "moving people off one unauthorised site and leaving them to find another one". Chilmington Gypsy Site has expanded over the intervening decades in line with the expansion of Ashford itself.

=== The Irish Commission on Itinerancy ===
Similar to how the Beveridge Report in Britain inspired a change in social policy there, in Ireland there was a change in government approach from non-intervention. The changes were generally reflective of a paradigm shift in the Western hemisphere on the government's role in society and economy.

Beginning in the late 1950s, the National Economic and Social Council (a government-appointed advisory body) produced a series of reports on economic and social matters. This marked a departure in the history of the Irish state, up to this point the government had simply deferred to the Catholic Church in the area of social welfare.

In June 1960 the government established a Commission on Itinerancy, the first specific state focus on Travellers in the history of the independent Irish state. This government body finalised their findings in "The Report of the Commission", in August 1963, publishing it on 26 November.

In September 1961, the Commission on Itinerancy travelled to the Netherlands to consider the policy there. Dutch policy on Travellers was in its second generation. A version of halting sites had been created under the 1918 Caravan Act.

Dutch caravan site in 1923

The Irish delegation visited Woonwagenkampen (tr. caravan camps). In camps like the one in Vlijmenseweg in the city of 's-Hertogenbosch they examined the facilities. Also, whilst there, the Irish delegation interviewed – through the use of interpreters – those Dutch Travellers resident on the sites.

The Itinerancy Commission report in 1963 expressed satisfaction with the results of the Netherlands policy:

1. Facilitating Travellers in a single designated place in the locality allowed for sustained school attendance, and retention of contact with employers, employees, and business liaisons as well as for health and welfare services, voluntary organisations and religious bodies
2. The living facilities in the Municipal Sites are superior than traditional caravans and tents, greatly increasing living standards, prolonging lifespans, reducing the rates of sickness and problematic pregnancy

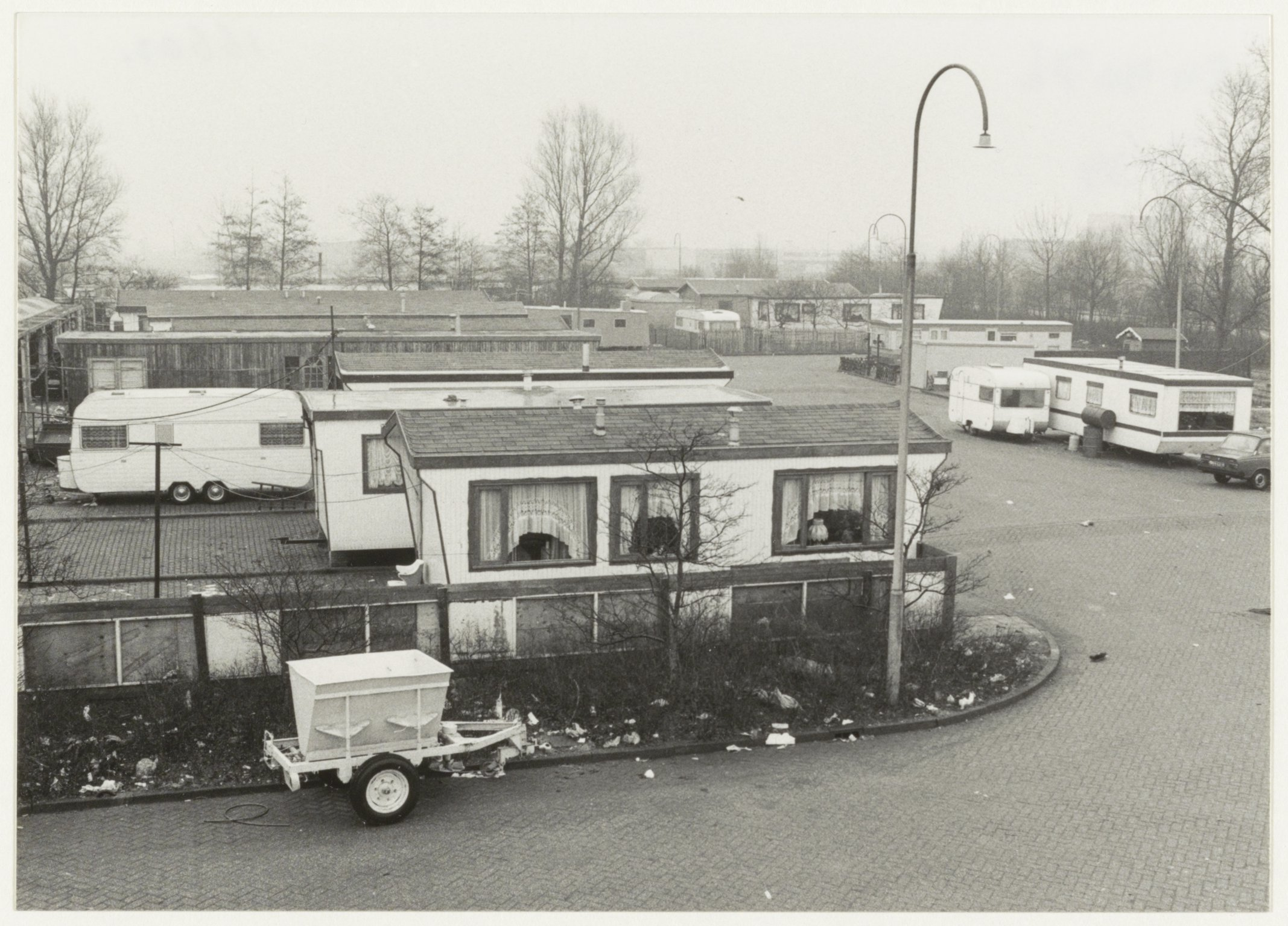
Travellers’ caravan site in Haarlem, Netherlands, 1985

The Report recommended the provision by each local authority of halting bay sites where numbers of itinerant families habitually frequent an area. The standard of these facilities were to be on a par with those in Chilmington Site and in the Travellers’ Camps (nl) in the Netherlands.

The Irish delegation was impressed with the joint planning from the relevant parties involved. A conference in Netherlands in 1963 was held involving all the bodies that work with the Travellers. At this conference officials from municipal government, health and welfare services, charities and the clergy came together to learn from each other. Mistakenly, there was no Traveller representation at this stage.

The references to this conference in the Report stands out because of the Irish acknowledgment that dealings with Travellers in the Netherlands improved when a holistic approach was taken. Prior to this, state dealings in Ireland with Travellers were largely only in the area of criminal justice. "The object of the conference was to emphasise that the problem of itinerancy can only be solved by the humane treatment of the itinerants".

Criticism has been made in retrospect that Ministerial commitment was not matched at local authority level. The 1983 Travelling People Review Body Report states that "compliance by some local authorities was marked by tardiness". The recommendations of having financial incentive, and a system of oversight to bypass "local political and community indifference" did not occur with the 1998 Act.

One of the results of the 1963 Commission Report was the establishment of the National Council for Travelling People. The committee in Dublin was led by Fr. Tom Fehily, Victor Bewley, and Eleanor Butler. Pressure was maintained by this voluntary group on local municipal government to provide halting sites.

"The provision by Local Authorities of serviced camping sites provides the necessary springboard for the itinerants. Such sites can act as a bridge between the itinerants and the settled community, and help both communities towards a mutual understanding."
- The Irish Times, 15 December 1969

== Public perception ==
=== Causes for resentment ===
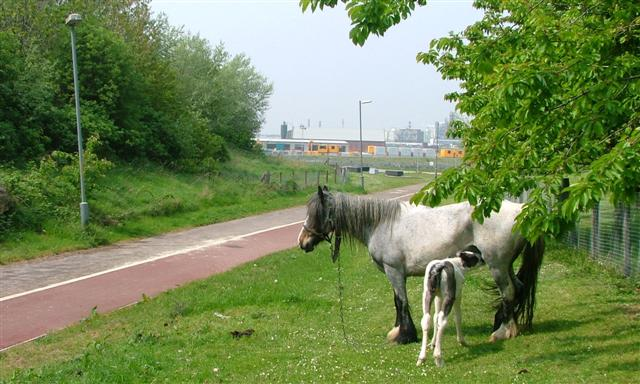
Loose horses grazing on public land can be a concern for passers-by.

Some halting sites become the source of resentment from other local residents because of examples of anti-social behaviour. Regular concerns include increased litter, vandalism, house robberies, begging, noise, loose horses and/or dogs, a build-up of discarded domestic waste and scrap metal. People have fears for their personal safety, household security as well as a fall in property value. A succession of news stories feature in the media about topics like, faction fighting, illegal dumping, storage of stolen goods, drug trafficking, paramilitarism, drunken aggression, and slave labour.

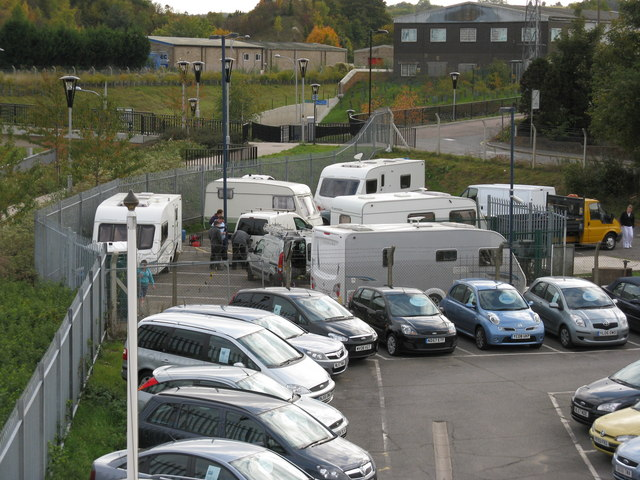
A Traveller camp in a car park

These stories generate a negative image of the locality, and further worsen relations between Travellers and the settled community. The extent of feeling on the issue can be seen when on occasion people take legal action on proposed halting sites. In November 1987, a High Court challenge was successfully launched on the grounds that two planned halting sites were found to be in material contravention of the 1986 Dublin County Development Plan.

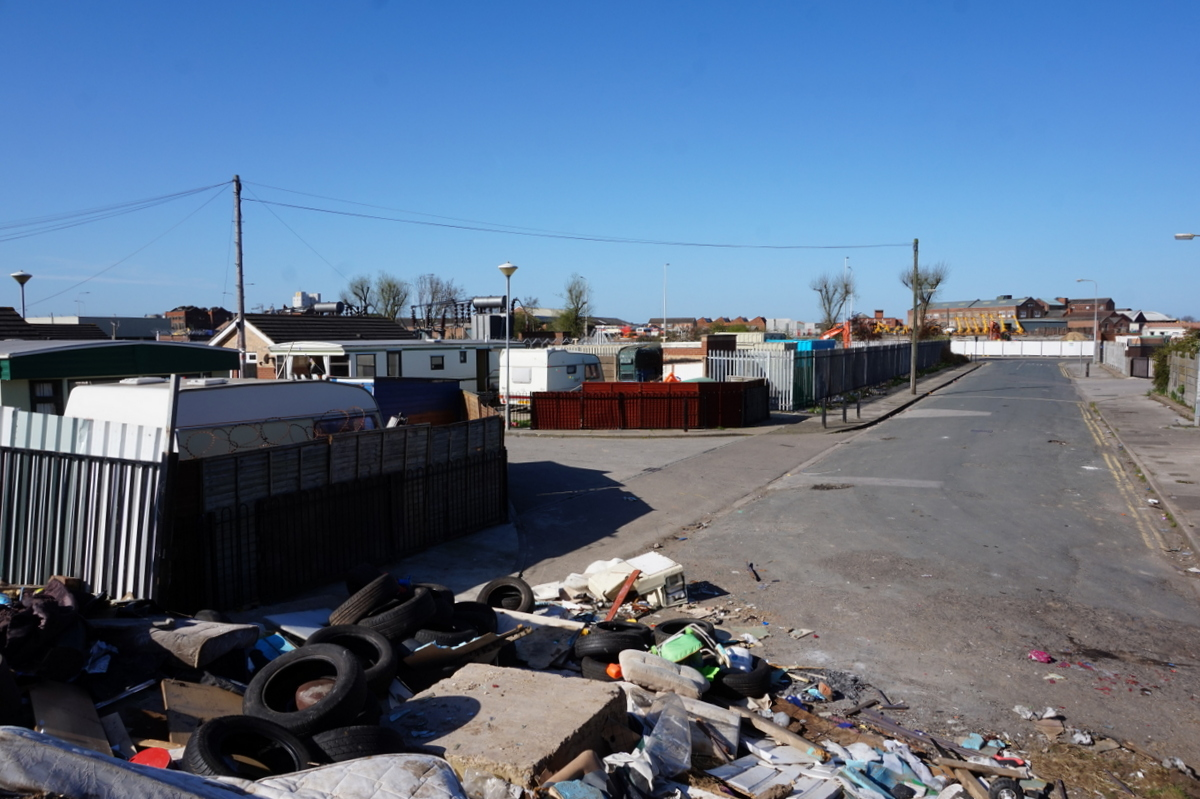
Illegal waste disposal at Traveller halting site, Kingston-Upon-Hull, England

Often feelings can be polarised because an effective campaign from Residents’ Associations gives an exaggerated perception to the extent of opposition. Media-savvy, articulate opponents with legal knowledge compound the distortion by claiming blanket support for their position. On occasion some unauthorised camps have seen vigilante incidents, which cause further deterioration in relations. General concerns by the settled community caused by hyped media reports of anti-social behavior and crime only serve to curtail Traveller families whose presence in the community poses no threat.

=== Effects of anti-social behaviour ===
One way anti-social behaviour impacts negatively on local residents is by imposing an unwanted financial burden. To cover these costs, money must be re-directed away from County Council services that benefit the local residents

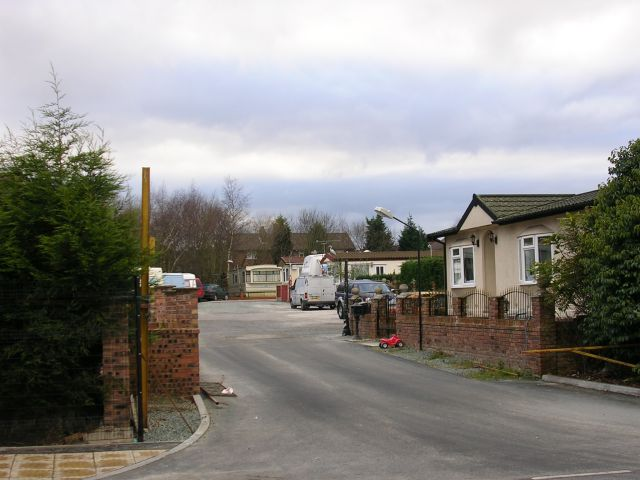
The county council, as landlord of a halting site, is obliged to follow up on complaints.

County Councils can respond to anti-social behaviour by imposing penalties. If a tenant is evicted from their accommodation due to anti-social behaviour, they are deemed homeless. Consequently, they may not be provided with another home by the County Council. Allocation is withheld for a probationary period of 3 years. A County Council may reduce the waiting time if the evictee can convince them they are willing and able to live in the community without engaging in further anti-social behaviour.

Some Travellers surveyed have agreed with penalties, arguing for intervention by official bodies to tackle anti-social behaviour issues. It was pointed out that the local authority and the Garda Síochána need to intervene and take action at an early stage to deal with issues of violence. Half of the local authorities consulted identified internal tensions and lack of compatibility between Traveller families as the primary reasons for Travellers leaving Traveller-specific accommodation. There have been reported cases of violence erupting involving unauthorised people in a halting site, and deteriorating family relations.

== Geographical distribution in the Republic of Ireland ==
The following is a sample of halting sites across Ireland

=== Dublin Region ===
- Saint Margaret's Park in Ballymun in Dublin city
- Booterstown Park in Blackrock in Dún Laoghaire
- Barnlodge in Cappagh Road in county Fingal
- Brookfield in Tallaght in south Dublin

=== Northern & Western Region ===
- Cúl Trá in Galway City
- Humbert Way in Mayo
- Ardara in Donegal
- Gortakeegan in Monaghan

=== Eastern & Midlands Region ===
- Bestfield in Carlow
- Ardrew in Kildare
- Silverbridge in Wicklow
- St. Francis Park in Meath

=== Southern Region ===
- Ballyknock in Tipperary
- Spring Lane in Cork City
- Kilbarry in Waterford
- Toppins’ Field in Limerick
- Ballymurtagh in Shannon town in Clare

== See also ==
- Trailer park
