= Kevin O'Connor =

Kevin O'Connor may refer to:

== Arts and entertainment ==
- Kevin O'Connor (actor, born 1935) (1935–1991), American actor
- Kevin J. O'Connor (actor) (born 1963), American actor
- Kevin O'Connor (TV personality) (born 1968), host of This Old House
- Kevin O'Connor, fictional character on the American TV soap opera General Hospital
- Kevin O'Connor (musician), musician of the band Talkdemonic
- Kevin O'Connor (Reality TV), Amazing Race contestant

== Politics and law ==
- Kevin J. O'Connor (attorney) (born 1967), American attorney
- Kevin O'Connor (Massachusetts politician), candidate for U.S. Senate from Massachusetts in 2020
- Kevin O'Connor (Minnesota politician), candidate for U.S. Senate from Minnesota in 2020

== Sports ==
- Kevin O'Connor (hurler) (1923–2004), Irish hurler
- Kevin O'Connor (cricketer) (born 1940), New Zealand cricketer
- Kevin O'Connor (basketball) (born c. 1947), general manager of the Utah Jazz
- Kevin O'Connor (footballer, born 1982), English-born Irish football player for Brentford
- Kevin O'Connor (footballer, born 1985), Irish football player for Bray Wanderers
- Kevin O'Connor (footballer, born 1995), Irish football player for Preston North End

== Others ==
- Kevin O'Connor (entrepreneur) (born 1961), American entrepreneur; co-founder of DoubleClick
- Kevin O'Connor (historian) (born 1967), American historian; professor at Gonzaga University
- Kevin O'Connor (physician), American osteopathic physician, U.S. Army colonel and physician to U.S. President Joe Biden
