= David O'Connor =

David O'Connor may refer to:

- David O'Connor (Egyptologist) (1938–2022), Australian Egyptologist
- David O'Connor (equestrian) (born 1962), American international eventer
- David O'Connor (footballer) (born 1985), Drogheda United player
- David J. O'Connor (1924–2011), member of the Massachusetts House of Representatives
- David O'Connor (illustrator), an illustrator of The Fey Series
- David O'Connor (rugby union) (born 1995), Irish rugby union player
- David O'Connor (singer), Irish winner of series five of You're a Star in 2006–07

== See also ==
- David Connor (disambiguation)
