= Conner =

Conner or Conners may refer to:

== People ==
- Conner (surname)
- Conner (given name)
- Conners (surname)

== Places ==
- La Conner, a town in the state of Washington, United States
- Mount Conner, Northern Territory, Australia
- Conner, Apayao, a municipality in the Philippines
- Conner, Montana, a community
- Conner Preserve, a park in Florida
- Conner Prairie, a living history museum in Fishers, Indiana, United States
- Conner High School, a public high school in Hebron, Kentucky, United States

== Other uses ==
- The Conners, an American TV series, spin-off of Roseanne
- Conner Peripherals, a manufacturer of computer hard drives, now the property of Seagate
- USS Conner, two US Navy ships
- "Conner" (Titans episode)
- Conner (Titans character)
- Ale conner, an officer appointed yearly at the court-leet of ancient English communities to ensure the goodness and wholesomeness of bread, ale, and beer
- Cunner, also known as conner, a type of fish found in North Atlantic waters

== See also ==
- O'Conner
- Connor (disambiguation)
