= Connor =

Connor may refer to the following:

== People ==
- Connor (given name), list of people with this name
- Connor (surname)
- Harriet Connor Brown (1872–1962), American writer and women's rights activist

== Places and jurisdictions ==
- Connor, County Antrim, a town in Northern Ireland, seat of:
  - the present Anglican Diocese of Connor (Church of Ireland)
  - the former Roman Catholic Diocese of Connor, merged into the present Diocese of Down and Connor
- Connor Downs, Cornwall, England
- Connor, Maine, unincorporated area in Aroostook County, Maine, United States
- Mount Connor, Northern Territory, Australia
- Connor Battle, Tongue River, American Civil War

== Other uses ==
- Connor (retailer), an Australian and New Zealand clothing retail chain
- "Conor", sometimes spelled "Connor", a song by the Feeling from Join with Us, 2008
- Ratonhnhaké:ton, the protagonist of Assassin's Creed III, also known as Connor

== See also ==
- Conor
- Conner (disambiguation)
- Connors (disambiguation)
- O'Connor (disambiguation)
- Justice Connor (disambiguation)
