= James Connor =

James Connor may refer to:

- James Conner (general) (1829–1883), Confederate general in the American Civil War
- James Perry Conner (1851–1924), U.S. Representative from Iowa
- James Connor (politician), American politician from New Hampshire
- James Connor (Scottish footballer) (1861–1899), footballer for Airdrieonians and Scotland
- James Connor (English footballer) (1867–1929), footballer for Aston Villa and Nottingham Forest
- James M. Connor (born 1960), American actor
- James Phillip Connor (1919–1994), US soldier awarded the Medal of Honor during World War II
- James Conner (American football) (born 1995), American football player
- James Connor (equestrian) (born 1959), Irish horse rider
- James Connor (diver) (born 1995), Australian diver
- James E. Connor, American political aide for Gerald Ford

== See also ==
- Jimmy Connor (disambiguation)
- James Conner (disambiguation)
- James Connors (disambiguation)
- James O'Connor (disambiguation)
- Connor James (disambiguation)
