= Jimmy Connor =

Jimmy Connor may refer to:

- Jimmy Connor (footballer, born 1881), Scottish association football defender who played for Blackpool
- Jimmy Connor (footballer, born 1909) (1909–1980), association football winger who played for Sunderland and Scotland
- Jimmy Connor (footballer, born 1938), English association football winger who played for Darlington

== See also ==
- James Connor (disambiguation)
- Jimmy Connors (born 1952), tennis player
- Jimmy O'Connor, footballer
- Jimmy O'Connor (author) (1918–2001), television playwright
