= Connors (surname) =

Connors is a surname. Notable people with the surname include:

- Alanna Connors (1956–2013), Hong Kong-born American astronomer and statistician
- Andree Connors, poet and novelist
- Bill Connors, jazz musician
- Bill Connors (baseball), baseball player and executive
- Bobby Connors, ice hockey player
- Buck Connors, American actor
- Carol Connors (disambiguation), several people
- Christopher J. Connors, American politician
- Chuck Connors, American actor
- Daniel Connors, Australian rules footballer
- Dean Connors (born 2003), American football player
- Dennis Connors, American Para-cyclist
- Edward G. Connors, American bar owner and gang associate
- Graeme Connors, Australian country music singer
- James Connors (disambiguation), including Jimmy Connors
- Jimmy Connors, American tennis player
- Joe Connors, 19th century baseball player
- Joseph Connors, American art historian
- John Connors, Irish recipient of the Victoria Cross
- Kevin Connors, ESPNews anchor
- L. Joseph Connors, American politicians
- Leonard T. Connors, American politician
- Loren Mazzacane Connors, American musician
- Mark Connors, Australian rugby union footballer
- Merv Connors, American baseball player
- Mike Connors (1925–2017), American actor
- Noel Connors, Irish athlete
- Norman Connors, American jazz drummer
- Robert Connors, American football player
- Ronald Gerard Connors, American-born Catholic bishop of San Juan de la Maguana, Dominican Republic
- Rose Connors, mystery fiction author
- Scruff Connors, Canadian radio broadcaster
- Stompin' Tom Connors (1936–2013), Canadian folk singer
- Connors or Conners, surname of at least eight people arrested in England as part of Operation Netwing

== Fictional characters ==
- Curt Connors (Lizard), Marvel Comics character
- Billy Connors, Marvel Comics character; son of Curt Connors
- Martha Connors, Marvel Comics character; wife of Curt Connors
- Max Connors in the Australian TV series SeaChange
- Faith Connors, the main protagonist of the 2008 video game Mirror's Edge

== See also ==
- Conners
- Connor (surname)
