= Jennifer O'Connor =

Jennifer O'Connor may refer to:

- Jennifer O'Connor (netball) (born 1984), Australian netball player
- Jennifer O'Connor (musician) (born 1973), American singer-songwriter
- Jennifer Murnane O'Connor (born 1966), Irish Fianna Fáil politician
