= Jack Conner =

Jack Conner is the name of:

- Jack Conner (footballer, born 1891) (1891–?), Scottish footballer
- John Conner (footballer) (1896–?), Scottish footballer nicknamed "Jack"
- Jack Conner (footballer, born 1898) (1898–1967), Scottish footballer
- John Chellis Conner (1913–2001), American marimba player nicknamed "Jack"

== See also ==
- Jack Connor (disambiguation)
