= Connors =

Connors may refer to:

== People ==
- Connors (surname), list of people with this name

== Places ==
- Connors, New Brunswick, Canada
- Connor's Mill, Toodyay, Western Australia
- Connors Road, Edmonton, Canada
- Connors State College, Warner, Oklahoma, United States
- Connorsville, Wisconsin, United States
- 13700 Connors, an asteroid

== See also ==
- Conners, list of people with this name
- Connor (disambiguation)
- Conner (disambiguation)
