= William Sweeney (Medal of Honor) =

US Navy sailor (born 1856, date of death unknown)

- Navy Medal of Honor
- Born: 1856; Boston, Massachusetts
- Died: Unknown
- Military career
- Allegiance: United States
- Branch: United States Navy
- Rank: Landsman
- Unit: USS Jean Sands
- Awards: Medal of Honor

William Sweeney (born 1856, date of death unknown) was a United States Navy sailor and a recipient of the United States military's highest decoration, the Medal of Honor.

Born in 1856 in Boston, Massachusetts, Sweeney joined the Navy from that state. By June 15, 1880, he was serving as a landsman in the engineering department of the USS Jean Sands. On that night, while Jean Sands was outside the Norfolk Naval Shipyard, he and another sailor, Landsman James F. O'Conner, jumped overboard and rescued a young girl from drowning. For this action, both Sweeney and O'Conner were awarded the Medal of Honor four years later, on October 18, 1884.

Sweeney's official Medal of Honor citation reads:

For jumping overboard from the U.S.S. Jean Sands, opposite the Navy Yard, Norfolk, Va., on the night of 15 June 1880, and rescuing from drowning a young girl who had fallen overboard.

== See also ==
- List of Medal of Honor recipients during peacetime
