= Connor (given name) =

- Pronunciation: /ˈkɒnər/ KON-ər
- Gender: Male
- Language: English

Origin
- Language: Gaelic
- Origin: Conchobar
- Meaning: "lover of hounds", or "lover of wolves"
- Region of origin: Irish and Hiberno-Norman

Other names
- Related names: Conor (Irish); Conchúr (Irish); Conomor (Cornish/Breton); Connah (Welsh); Konnor (North American)

Connor is an Irish male given name, anglicised from the compound Irish word Conchobhar, meaning "lover of hounds", or "lover of wolves". The most prominent person with this name in medieval Ireland was the Irish king Conchobar mac Nessa, a semi-legendary king in Ulster described in the Ulster Cycle of Irish mythology, and the name was probably first anglicised to Connor by the Hiberno-Normans.

== Historical figures ==
- Connor King of Connacht, 12th-century king
- Connor mac Tadg, 10th-century king and eponym of the Clan O'Connor
- Connor O'Brien, King of Thomond, 16th-century king
- Connor 'The Tawny' McKiernan, 14th-century chieftain
- Connor O'Brien, 3rd Earl of Thormond, 16th-century peer and militia leader
- Saint Connor O'Devany, 16th-century bishop and martyr
- Connor Maguire, 2nd Baron of Enniskillen, Irish peer and rebel leader
- Connor O'Brien, 2nd Viscount Clare (1605–1670), Irish peer

== People named Connor ==
=== Actors ===
- Connor Gibbs (born 2001), Canadian actor
- Connor Paolo (born 1990), American actor
- Connor Swindells (born 1996), English actor
- Connor Trinneer (born 1969), American actor
- Connor Storrie (born 2000), American actor

=== Sportspeople ===
==== American football (gridiron) ====
- Connor Barry (born 2003), American college football player
- Connor Barth (born 1986), American football player
- Connor Barwin (born 1986), American football player
- Connor Bazelak (born 2000), American football player
- Connor Colby (born 2003), American football player
- Connor Davis (born 1994), American football player
- Connor Galvin (born 2000), American football player
- Connor Hamlett (born 1992), American football player
- Connor Heyward (born 1999), American football player
- Connor Hughes (American football) (born 1983), American football player
- Connor Lew (born 2005), American football player
- Connor McGovern (American football, born 1993), American football player
- Connor McGovern (American football, born 1997), American football player
- Connor Shaw (born 1991), American football player
- Connor Tollison (born 2002), American football player
- Connor Williams (American football) (born 1997), American football player

==== Baseball ====
- Connor Robertson (born 1981), American baseball player
- Connor Seabold (born 1996), American baseball player
- Connor Wong (born 1996), American baseball player

==== Football (soccer) ====
- Connor Calcutt (born 1993), English footballer
- Connor Chapman (born 1994), Australian footballer
- Connor Hughes (footballer) (born 1993), English footballer
- Connor James (soccer) (born 1996), Canadian soccer player
- Connor Pain (born 1993), Australian footballer
- Connor Randall (born 1995), English footballer
- Connor Wickham (born 1993), English footballer
- Connor Wood (footballer) (born 1996), English footballer

==== Ice hockey ====
- Connor Bedard (born 2005), Canadian ice hockey player
- Connor Carrick (born 1994), American ice hockey player
- Connor Clifton (born 1995), American ice hockey player
- Connor Hellebuyck (born 1993), American ice hockey player
- Connor James (ice hockey) (born 1982), Canadian ice hockey player
- Connor McDavid (born 1997), Canadian ice hockey player
- Connor McMichael (born 2001), Canadian ice hockey player
- Connor Murphy (born 1993), American ice hockey player
- Connor Zary (born 2001), Canadian ice hockey player

==== Other sports ====
- Connor Arendell (born 1990), American golfer
- Connor Behan (born 1991), British motorcycle racer
- Connor Bell (racing driver) (bon 2005), American racing driver
- Connor Butler (born 1998), English professional boxer
- Connor Coyle (born 1990), Irish professional boxer
- Connor Curran (born 2004), American freestyle skier
- Connor Essegian (born 2003), American basketball player
- Connor Fields (born 1992), American BMX racer
- Connor Garnett, American professional pickleball player
- Connor Grimes (born 1983), Canadian field hockey player
- Connor Mosack (born 1999), American racing driver
- Connor Wood (basketball) (born 1993), Canadian basketball player
- Connor Zilisch (born 2006), American racing driver

=== Other fields ===
- Connor Ball (born 1996), British musician
- Connor Brown (disambiguation), several people
- Connor Colquhoun (born 1996), British YouTuber and voice actor
- Connor Franta (born 1992), American vlogger
- Connor Michalek (2005–2014), American cancer patient

=== Fictional characters ===
- Connor (Angel), a primary character in the television series Angel
- Connor Costello, in the Australian medical drama All Saints
- Connor Hawke, a DC Comics superhero
- Connor MacLeod, in the Highlander film and television series
- Connor Murphy, in the Broadway musical Dear Evan Hansen
- Dr. Connor Rhodes, a main character in the NBC medical drama Chicago Med
- Connor Temple, in the ITV series Primeval
- Connor Walsh, in the television series How to Get Away with Murder

== People named Conner ==
- Conner Greene (born 1995), American baseball player
- Conner Harrell (born 2004), American football player
- Conner Henry (born 1963), American basketball coach
- Conner Kelsall (born 1999), English professional boxer
- Conner O'Malley (born 1986), American comedian and writer
- Conner Reeves (born 1972), English singer and songwriter
- Conner Rousseau (born 1992), Belgian politician
- Conner Smith, American singer

=== Fictional characters ===
- Conner Kent, DC Comics character also known as Superboy
- Conner McKnight in the television series Power Rangers: Dino Thunder

== People named Konnor ==
- Konnor (wrestler) (born 1980), ring name of Ryan Parmeter, American wrestler
- Konnor Griffin (born 2006), American baseball player
- Konnor McClain (born 2005), American female artistic gymnast
- Konnor Pilkington (born 1997), American baseball player
- Konnor Ralph (born 2003), American freestyle skier
- Max Konnor (born 1986 or 1987), American gay pornographic film actor

== See also ==
- Conor
- Connor (surname)
- Connor (disambiguation)
