= Judge Conner =

Judge Conner may refer to:

- Christopher C. Conner (born 1957), judge of the United States District Court for the Middle District of Pennsylvania
- William C. Conner (1920–2009), judge of the United States District Court for the Southern District of New York

== See also ==
- Judge Connor (disambiguation)
