= Roman Catholic Diocese of Connor =

See Conor for namesakes

The Roman Catholic Diocese of Connor was a Catholic diocese in Ireland which started as a territorial abbey circa 500, became a proper residential bishopric in 1111 and was merged into the Roman Catholic Diocese of Down (and Connor) in 1439.

== History ==
- Established circa 500 as Abbacy nullius of Connor / Connoren(sis) (Latin). The origins of the Irish prelatures are generally fuzzy until the twelfth century as the monasteries were the stable institutions leading ecclesiastical jurisdictions, with some of their abbots were individually consecrated bishop, without raising their sees to permanently residential dioceses. Furthermore this allowed abbeys to function as 'minor sees' from time to time, in the case of the future diocese of Connor notably Kilroot, Drumtullagh, Culfeightrim, Coleraine, Inispollen, Armoy and Rashee, some of whose abbots were consecrated as full bishop or as auxiliary Chorepiscopus.
- Promoted in 1111 as Diocese of Connor / Connoren(sis) (Latin) at the synod of Rathbreasail, which replaced the territorial abbeys with stable dioceses, including Down and Connor, unlike the extinct minor sees; Connor was assigned as canonical territory Dalriada, as confirmed at the synod of Kells in 1152, Conor having been in personal union with the Diocese of Down in between both councils in the person of Malachias O'Morgair, a major reformer of the 12th century Irish church.
- The invading Anglo-norman John de Courcy imposed on Down its own bishop in 1177 imprisoning the incumbent and in 1183 replaced its chapter with English Benedictines, renaming the Holy Trinity cathedral Saint Patrick, but left Connor intact.
- Fiscal lists from early 14th century indicate the diocese comprised 72 parishes, 13 vicariates and 3 more chapels.
- Suppressed on July 29, 1439 by Pope Eugenius IV, conforming to a decree by King Henry VI of England from 1438, its territory being merged into the Roman Catholic Diocese of Down, another former abbey nullius, which shortly after absorbed its title, being in 1442 renamed as Diocese of Down and Connor / Dunen(sis) et Connoren(sis) (Latin); however it did not retain a co-cathedral.

== Ordinaries ==
(all Roman Rite)

Abbots nullius of Connor

- Saint Abbot Mac Nisse (? – death September 3, 514)
- Saint Abbot Lughadh (? – death 543)
- Dioma (? – death 659.01.06), consulted by Rome in 640 concerning the Easter controversy
- Saint Abbot Duchonna (? – death 726.05.15)
- Aegedcharus (Oegedchair) (? – death 867), scribe and copyist
- Flanagan MacAllchon (? – death 954)
- Maëlbrigid (? – death 956)
- Joseph (? – death 965)
- Cuinden (? – death 1039), erudite professor

Suffragan? Bishops of Connor

- Flan O’Scula (? – death 1118)
- Saint Bishop Máel Máedóc Ua Morgair (Malachy O’Morgair) (1124 – 1134), also Bishop of Down (1124 – 1134); next Metropolitan Archbishop of Armagh (1134 – retired 1137?), died 1148.11.02
- Patrick O’Bainam (1152? – ?)
- Nehemiah (1172? – ?)
- Reginald (1178? – death 1225)
- Eustace (1226? – death 1241?)
- Adam, Cistercian Order (O. Cist.) (1241 – death 1244.11.07)
- Isaac of Newcastle (1245.04.04 – death 1257)
- William (1257.10.27 – death 1260)
- William de Hay (1260.08.10 – death 1262.12)
- Robert il Fiammingo (1263.02 – death 1274.12) - from Flanders according to his name
- Peter of Donath (1275.02 – death 1292.11)
- John of Corriton (1293.02 – death 1311)
- Richard (1311 – death 1320)
- John de Egglescliffe, Dominican Order (O.P.) (1322 – 1323.06.20), next Bishop of Llandaff (Wales) (1323.06.20 – death 1347.01.02)
- Robert Wirsop, Augustinian Order (O.E.S.A.) (1323.06.20 – death 1324), previously Bishop of Ardagh (Ireland) (1323.04.05 – 1323.06.20 not possessed)
- Jacobus Ó Cethernaig (James O’Kearney) (1324.05 – death 1351), previously Bishop of Annaghdown (1323.12.16 – 1324.05)
- William Mercier (1353.07.08 – death 1374)
- Paul (1374.12.11 – death 1376?)
- John (1389.11.09 – death 1411?)
- John O’Loughry (1420.05.22 – ?)
- Eoghan Ó Domhnaill (1421.05.05 – 1429.12.09), next Bishop of Derry (1429.12.09 – death 1433)
- Domhnall Ó Mearaich (1429.12.09 – death 1431.01.28), previously Bishop of Derry (1419.10.16 – 1429.12.09)
- John Fossade (1432.01.24 – 1442), next first Bishop of successor see Down (and Connor) (1442 – 1450), initially jointly with John Cely of Down, who was deposed for debauchery in 1441 but proved hard to actually dispossess.

== See also ==
- List of Catholic dioceses in Ireland

== Sources and external links ==
- GCatholic

Bibliography

- 'Down and Connor', in Catholic Encyclopedia, New York, Encyclopedia Press, 1913.
- C. Mooney, lemma 'Down et Connor', in Dictionnaire d'Histoire et de Géographie ecclésiastiques, vol. XIV, Paris 1960, coll. 754-767
- Pius Bonifacius Gams, Series episcoporum Ecclesiae Catholicae, Leipzig 1931, vol. I, pp. 216–217; vol. II, pp. 66–67
- Konrad Eubel, Hierarchia Catholica Medii Aevi, vol. 1, pp. 202 e 231; vol. 2, p. 147; vol. 3, p. 189; vol. 4, p. 178; vol. 5, p. 189; vol. 6, p. 202
- Henry Cotton, The Succession of the Prelates and Members of the Cathedral Bodies of Ireland. Fasti ecclesiae Hiberniae, Vol. 3, The Province of Ulster, Dublin, Hodges and Smith 1849, pp. 195–203, 245-250
- James O'Laverty, The bishops of Down & Connor, An Historical Account of the Diocese of Down and Connor, Ancient and Modern, vol. V, Dublin 1895
