= Connor James =

Connor James may refer to:

- Connor James (ice hockey), a Canadian hockey player
- Connor James (soccer), a Canadian soccer player

== See also ==
- Connor James Chatham
- James Connor (disambiguation)
- James Conner (disambiguation)
