= Conor =

- Gender: Masculine
- Language: English

Origin
- Language: Irish
- Origin: Conchobhar; Conchubhar; Conaire
- Meaning: lover of hounds

Other names
- Variant forms: Connor; Conner

Conor is a male given name of Irish origin. The meaning of the name is "Lover of Wolves" or "Lover of Hounds". Conchobhar/Conchubhar or from the name Conaire, found in Irish legend as the name of the high king Conaire Mór and other heroes. It is popular in the English-speaking world. Conor has recently become a popular name in North America and in Great Britain. Some alternative spellings for the name are often spelled Connor, Conner.

== Notable people named Conor ==
Men

- Conor Bradley, Northern Irish footballer
- Conor Brady, former editor of The Irish Times
- Conor Burns, British politician
- Conor Casey, American soccer player
- Conor Coady, English footballer
- Conor Cruise O'Brien, Irish politician and commentator
- Conor Daly, American racecar driver
- Conor Deasy, indie-pop singer
- Conor P. Delaney, Irish-American surgeon
- Conor Gannon (born 2002), Irish tennis player
- Conor Garland, American ice hockey player
- Conor Garvey (fl. 2010s), Irish Gaelic footballer
- Conor Gibbons, Irish Gaelic footballer
- Conor Gill, lacrosse player
- Conor Gillaspie, former MLB player
- Conor Grace, Irish professional basketball player
- Conor Heun, MMA Fighter
- Conor Henderson, English-Irish footballer
- Conor Jackson, Boston Red Sox outfielder
- Conor Kane (footballer), Irish footballer
- Conor Kane (journalist), Irish journalist
- Conor Knighton, San Francisco-based actor
- Conor Lamb, American Politician
- Conor Lenihan, Irish politician
- Conor Mason, British singer, songwriter, guitarist
- Conor Maynard, musician and YouTuber
- Conor MacNeill, Northern Irish actor
- Conor McBride, computer scientist
- Conor McDermott, American football player
- Conor McDermott-Mostowy, American speed skater
- Conor McCann, Northern Irish hurler
- Conor McCarthy (Cork Gaelic footballer), Irish Gaelic footballer
- Conor McCarthy (Monaghan Gaelic footballer) (born 1995), Irish Gaelic footballer
- Conor McGregor, MMA fighter
- Conor McManus (born 1987), Irish Gaelic footballer
- Conor McManus (footballer) (born 2004), English footballer
- Conor McMenamin (born 1995), Northern Irish footballer
- Conor McPherson, Irish playwright
- Conor Murphy, Irish politician
- Conor Murray, Irish rugby union player
- Conor Niland, Irish tennis player
- Conor Oberst, American singer-songwriter best known for his work in the band Bright Eyes
- Conor O'Brian (born 1980), ring name of American professional wrestler Ryan Parmeter, also known as Konnor
- Conor O'Brien, Irish singer-songwriter best known for his work in the band Villagers
- Conor O'Clery, Irish journalist
- Conor O'Shea, former rugby player, current Italian rugby head coach
- Conor O'Sullivan (disambiguation)
- Conor Sheary, American ice hockey player
- Conor Sinnott, (born 1986), Irish footballer

Women

- Conor Leslie, American actor

== Fictional characters ==
- Conor, main character of the Disney XD series Gamers Guide to Pretty Much Everything
- Conor Larkin, hero of the book Trinity by Leon Uris

== See also ==
- List of Irish-language given names
- Connor (disambiguation)
