= James F. O'Conner =

US Navy sailor and Medal of Honor recipient (1861–1940)

James Francis O'Conner
- Navy Medal of Honor
- Born: November 28, 1861; Portsmouth, Virginia
- Died: September 17, 1940 (aged 78); Portsmouth, Virginia
- Burial place: Oak Grove Cemetery, Portsmouth, Virginia
- Military career
- Allegiance: United States
- Branch: United States Navy
- Rank: Landsman
- Unit: USS Jean Sands
- Awards: Medal of Honor

James Francis O'Conner (November 28, 1861 – September 17, 1940) was a United States Navy sailor and a recipient of the United States military's highest decoration, the Medal of Honor.

== Biography ==
Born on November 28, 1861, in Portsmouth, Virginia, O'Conner joined the Navy from that state. By June 15, 1880, he was serving as a landsman in the engineering department of the USS Jean Sands. On that night, while Jean Sands was outside the Norfolk Naval Shipyard, he and another sailor, Landsman William Sweeney, jumped overboard and rescued a young girl from drowning. For this action, both O'Conner and Sweeney were awarded the Medal of Honor four years later, on October 18, 1884.

O'Conner's official Medal of Honor citation reads:

For jumping overboard from the U.S.S. Jean Sands, opposite the Norfolk Navy Yard, on the night of 15 June 1880, and rescuing from drowning a young girl who had fallen overboard.

O'Conner died on September 17, 1940, at age 78 and was buried at Oak Grove Cemetery in Portsmouth.

== See also ==
- List of Medal of Honor recipients in non-combat incidents
