= O'Connor =

O'Connor or O'Conor may refer to:

== People ==
- O'Connor or O'Conor, an Irish clan
- O'Connor Sligo, a royal dynasty ruling the northern part of the Kingdom of Connacht
- O'Connor (surname), including a list of people with the surname

== Places ==
- Burdett O'Connor Province, a province in the Tarija Department in Bolivia
- Division of O'Connor, a Western Australian electoral district in the Australian House of Representatives
- O'Connor, Australian Capital Territory
- O'Connor Island, Windmill Islands, Antarctica
- O'Connor, Nebraska, U.S.
- O'Connor, Ontario, Canada
- O'Connor, Western Australia, suburb of Perth
- Port O'Connor, Texas, U.S.

== Other ==
- O'Connor Airlines, a former South Australian airline
- O'Connor Drive, Toronto, Canada
- O'Connor v. Donaldson, a 1975 U.S. Supreme Court decision on the rights of mental health patients
- O'Connor v. Ortega, a 1987 U.S. Supreme Court decision on the privacy rights of government employees at work
- Sandra Day O'Connor High School (Arizona), Glendale, Arizona, U.S.
- Sandra Day O'Connor High School (Helotes, Texas), U.S.
- Senator O'Connor College School, Toronto, Canada

== See also ==
- O'Conner, variant form of the surname
