= Margaret O'Connor (milliner) =

Irish milliner and fashion designer

- Born: 1986 (age 39–40); County Clare, Ireland
- Education: GMIT
- Occupations: Milliner, fashion designer
- Known for: Millinery
- Website: https://notionsbymargaretoconnor.com/

Margaret O'Connor is an Irish milliner and fashion designer known for creating bespoke hats and headpieces. Her work has been featured at Irish and international fashion events, and she has designed headwear for public figures, performers, and television productions. She is the founder of the millinery brand Margaret O'Connor.

== Career ==
O'Connor earned a bachelor's degree in sculpture and paint at Galway-Mayo Institute of Technology.

O'Connor trained as a milliner before establishing her own business in Ireland. Early in her career she worked with Irish milliner Philip Treacy, an experience that influenced her approach to couture headwear.

During the COVID-19 pandemic, O'Connor adapted her business by expanding into online retail and virtual consultations, a move that was profiled by The Times.

Her work has been exhibited through projects including the Dublin Fringe Festival, where she designed contemporary headpieces inspired by Dublin statues.

In 2026, O'Connor designed the distinctive red sculptural headpiece worn by author Maggie O'Farrell at the British Academy Film Awards. The design received widespread media coverage in Ireland following the ceremony.

== Recognition ==
In 2014 O'Connor was awarded Millinerey Designer of the Year at the Irish Fashion Innovation Awards.

In 2017 O'Connor won the Global Innovations Award in Shanghai for her collaborations with designer Derek Lawlor.

In 2019 O'Connor won a national entrepreneurship award recognising her work in developing her business.

== Style ==
O'Connor's work combines traditional millinery techniques with sculptural contemporary forms. Her collections frequently incorporate hand-shaped felt, silk, sinamay and sculptural embellishments. She has described her aim as producing wearable couture suitable for both formal occasions and everyday fashion.
