= Judge O'Connor =

Judge O'Connor or O'Conor may refer to:

- Earl Eugene O'Connor (1922–1998), judge of the United States District Court for the District of Kansas
- James Francis Thaddeus O'Connor (1886–1949), judge of the United States District Court for the Southern District of California
- Reed O'Connor (born 1965), judge of the United States District Court for the Northern District of Texas
- Robert J. O'Conor Jr. (born 1934), judge of the United States District Court for the Southern District of Texas

== See also ==
- Justice O'Connor (disambiguation)
