= Michael O'Connor =

Michael O'Connor may refer to:

== Politicians ==
- Michael O'Connor (Australian politician) (1865–1940), Australian politician
- Michael O'Connor (Wisconsin politician) (1856–1925), Wisconsin state assemblyman
- Michael J. O'Connor (politician) (1928–2018), American politician in the state of South Dakota
- Michael P. O'Connor (politician) (1831–1881), U.S. representative

== Sportsmen ==
- Michael O'Connor (baseball) (born 1980), Major League Baseball player
- Michael O'Connor (Canadian football) (born 1996), Canadian football quarterback
- Michael O'Connor (footballer, born 1960), Irish association footballer
- Michael O'Connor (footballer, born 1987), Northern Irish footballer for Salford City and Northern Ireland
- Michael O'Connor (footballer, born 1998), Irish association footballer
- Michael O'Connor (hurler) (born 1930), Irish hurler
- Michael O'Connor (rugby) (born 1960), Australian rugby union and rugby league player
- Mick O'Connor (rugby league) (1903–1980), Australian rugby league player
- Michael O'Connor (swimmer) (born 1984), from Bermuda
- Michael O'Connor (water polo) (1900–1957), Irish water polo player

== Others ==
- Michael O'Connor (artist) (1801–1867), Irish stained glass artist
- Michael O'Connor (American bishop) (1810–1872), Catholic bishop of Pittsburgh, U.S.A.
- Michael O'Connor (Australian bishop) (1829–1883), Roman Catholic bishop of Ballarat
- Michael O'Connor (costume designer) (born 1965), English costume designer
- Michael O'Connor (priest) (1942–2025), dean of Auckland
- Michael O'Connor (union official), national secretary of the Australian Construction, Forestry, Maritime, Mining and Energy Union
- Michael J. O'Connor (animator) (1938–1992), American animator for The Simpsons
- Michael P. O'Connor (writer) (1896–1967), Irish doctor, writer and radio broadcaster
- Michael Patrick O'Connor (1950–2007), American linguist
- Michael O'Connor (centenarian) (1913–2022), Irish centenarian
- Mike O'Connor (journalist) (1946–2013), American journalist and correspondent for Mexico
