= David Connor =

David Connor may refer to:

- David Conner (naval officer) (1792–1856), officer of the United States Navy
- David Connor (footballer) (born 1945), English football defender
- David Connor (sailor) (born 1962), Australian Olympic sailor
- List of Damages characters § David Connor

== See also ==
- David Conner (disambiguation)
- David O'Connor (disambiguation)
