= Judge Connor =

Judge Connor may refer to:

- Aloysius Joseph Connor (1895–1967), judge of the United States District Court for the District of New Hampshire
- Henry G. Connor (1852–1924), judge of the United States District Court for the Eastern District of North Carolina

== See also ==
- Judge Conner (disambiguation)
- Justice Connor (disambiguation)
