= GMIT =

GMIT may refer to several educational institutions:

- Galway-Mayo Institute of Technology, Ireland
- G M Institute of Technology, Davangere, Karnataka, India
- Gargi Memorial Institute of Technology, Kolkata, West Bengal, India
- German-Mongolian Institute for Resources and Technology, Ulaanbaatar, Mongolia
