= Carol Connors =

Carol Connors may refer to:

- Carol Connors (actress) (born 1952), American erotic actress
- Carol Connors (singer) (born 1940), American singer-songwriter
