= Terry O'Connor =

Terry O'Connor may refer to:

- Terry O'Connor (politician) (born 1940), Canada politician
- Terry O'Connor (musician) (1897–1983), Irish musician and teacher
- Terry O'Connor (rugby league) (born 1971), English rugby player and commentator

== See also ==
- Tere O'Connor (born 1958), American choreographer
- Terence O'Connor (1891–1940), British politician
- Terrence O'Connor, Canadian judge
