= Kevin O'Connor (hurler) =

Irish hurler

Personal information
- Native name: Caoimhín Ó Conchubhair (Irish)
- Born: 1923 Waterford, Ireland
- Died: 18 October 2004 (aged 81) Waterford, Ireland
- Height: 6 ft 1 in (185 cm)

Sport
- Sport: Hurling
- Position: Right wing-forward
Club
- Years: Club
- Erin's Own
Club titles
- Waterford titles: 3
Inter-county
- Years: County
- Waterford
Inter-county titles
- Munster titles: 1
- All-Irelands: 1
- NHL: 0

Kevin O'Connor (1923 - 18 October 2004) was an Irish hurler who played as a right wing-forward for the Waterford senior team.

Born in Waterford, O'Connor first played competitive hurling in his youth. He subsequently became a regular member of the starting fifteen of the Waterford senior team and won one All-Ireland medal and one Munster medal.

At club level O'Connor was a three-time championship medallist with Erin's Own.

== Honours ==
=== Team ===
Erin's Own

- Waterford Senior Hurling Championship (1): 1942, 1946, 1947

Waterford

- All-Ireland Senior Hurling Championship (1): 1948
- Munster Senior Hurling Championship (1): 1948
