= Connor Brown =

Connor Brown may refer to:

- Connor Brown (cricketer) (born 1997), Welsh cricketer
- Connor Brown (cyclist) (born 1998), New Zealand cyclist
- Connor Brown (footballer) (born 1991), English footballer
- Connor Brown (ice hockey) (born 1994), Canadian ice hockey player
