= Henry Connor =

Henry Connor may refer to:

- Henry Connor (botanist) (1922–2016), New Zealand botanist
- Henry G. Connor (1852–1924), North Carolina state senator and state superior court judge
- Henry William Connor (1793–1866), U.S. representative from North Carolina

== See also ==
- Henry Conner (1837–1918), American hotelier, restaurateur, and member of the Wisconsin State Senate
