= Jimmy Connor (footballer, born 1938) =

English footballer

Personal information
- Full name: James Connor
- Date of birth: 28 November 1938
- Place of birth: Sunderland, England
- Position: Left winger

Senior career*
Years	Team	Apps	(Gls)
- Stanley United
1965–1966	Darlington	3	(0)
- * Club domestic league appearances and goals

James Connor (born 28 November 1938) is an English former amateur footballer who played on the left wing for Darlington in the Football League. He made his debut on 11 September 1965, in a 2–1 defeat away to Port Vale in the Fourth Division, and also played in the next two matches. He previously played non-league football for Stanley United.
