= Evelyn Connor =

American politician

Member of New Hampshire House of Representatives for Hillsborough 2
- In office 2012–2014

Personal details
- Party: Democratic

Evelyn M. Connor is an American politician. She was a member of the New Hampshire House of Representatives and represented Hillsborough 2nd district from 2012 to 2014.
