= Justice Connor =

Justice Connor may refer to:

- Henry G. Connor (1852–1924), associate justice of the North Carolina Supreme Court
- Roger G. Connor (1926–1999), associate justice of the Alaska Supreme Court

== See also ==
- Justice O'Connor (disambiguation)
- Judge Connor (disambiguation)
