= David O'Connor (footballer) =

Irish association footballer

Personal information
- Date of birth: 8 February 1985 (age 41)
- Place of birth: Tallaght, Dublin, Ireland
- Height: 1.78 m (5 ft 10 in)
- Position: Left midfielder

Youth career
- Cherry Orchard

Senior career*
Years	Team	Apps	(Gls)
2004–2006	St Patrick's Athletic	0	(0)
2005	→ Kilkenny City (loan)	?	(5)
2006–2007	Shamrock Rovers	36	(1)
2008	Dundalk	30	(2)
2009–2010	Drogheda United	15	(1)

Managerial career
- 2015–2018: Shelbourne (coach)
- * Club domestic league appearances and goals

David O'Connor (born 8 February 1985) is an Irish football coach and former player.

== Career ==
O'Connor began his career and leading Irish youth club, Cherry Orchard where he won a 3 All Ireland cups, a Premier Division medal, 2 league cups and the FAI Youth Cup before transferring to the League of Ireland where he has won two First Division titles.

=== Shamrock Rovers ===
Following short spells at St Patrick's Athletic and an impressive loan spell at Kilkenny City, O'Connor then transferred to Shamrock Rovers. In his two seasons at Rovers, O'Connor won the 2006 First Division title and made the semi final of the FAI Cup in his this season and a League Cup semi final in his second season and went on to and make a total of 49 appearances scoring one goal.

=== Dundalk ===
Whilst at Dundalk he was one of a group of Tallaght born footballers at the club. He made his competitive debut in March 2008 away to Shelbourne and is first goal for Dundalk come is a 6–0 drubbing of Kildare County.

Coming to the close in the season O'Connor outlined that "It's going really well for us at the moment so hopefully we can finish the season on a high note". In the run up to the end of the season O'Connor scored in the 2–1 win against Shelbourne to move Dundalk eight points clear at the end of the season and on to eventually winning the 2008 First Division title.

At the end of the season O'Connor then moved to County Louth rivals Drogheda United at the beginning of the Premier Division 2009 season.

=== Drogheda United ===
In June 2009, O'Connor scored his first goal in the Premier Division in what was described as the "biggest shock of the League of Ireland calendar". O'Connor came on as a 60th minute substitute in place of Robbie Martin for "the Boynesiders" with the game against Cork City level at one goal a piece. In the 80th minute a cross from teammate Jamie Duffy, who broke down the right side of the pitch, bounced into O'Connor's path and he drilled the ball home to the bottom right of the goal past the outstreched fingers of keeper Dan Connor to earn Drogheda a victory.
