= Brendan O'Connor =

Brendan O'Connor may refer to:

- Brendan O'Connor (media personality) (born 1970), Irish comedian, columnist, and media personality
- Brendan O'Connor (politician) (born 1962), Australian politician and federal government minister
- Brendan O'Connor (soldier), Special Forces medical sergeant

== See also ==
- Brendan Connor, Canadian sports journalist
- Brendon O'Connor, New Zealand rugby union footballer
