= German-Mongolian Institute for Resources and Technology =

Higher education in Nalaikh, Ulaanbaatar, Mongolia

- Монгол-Германы хамтарсан ашигт малтмал, технологийн их сургууль Mongol-Gyermany khamtarsan ashigt maltmal, tyekhnologiin ikh surguuli
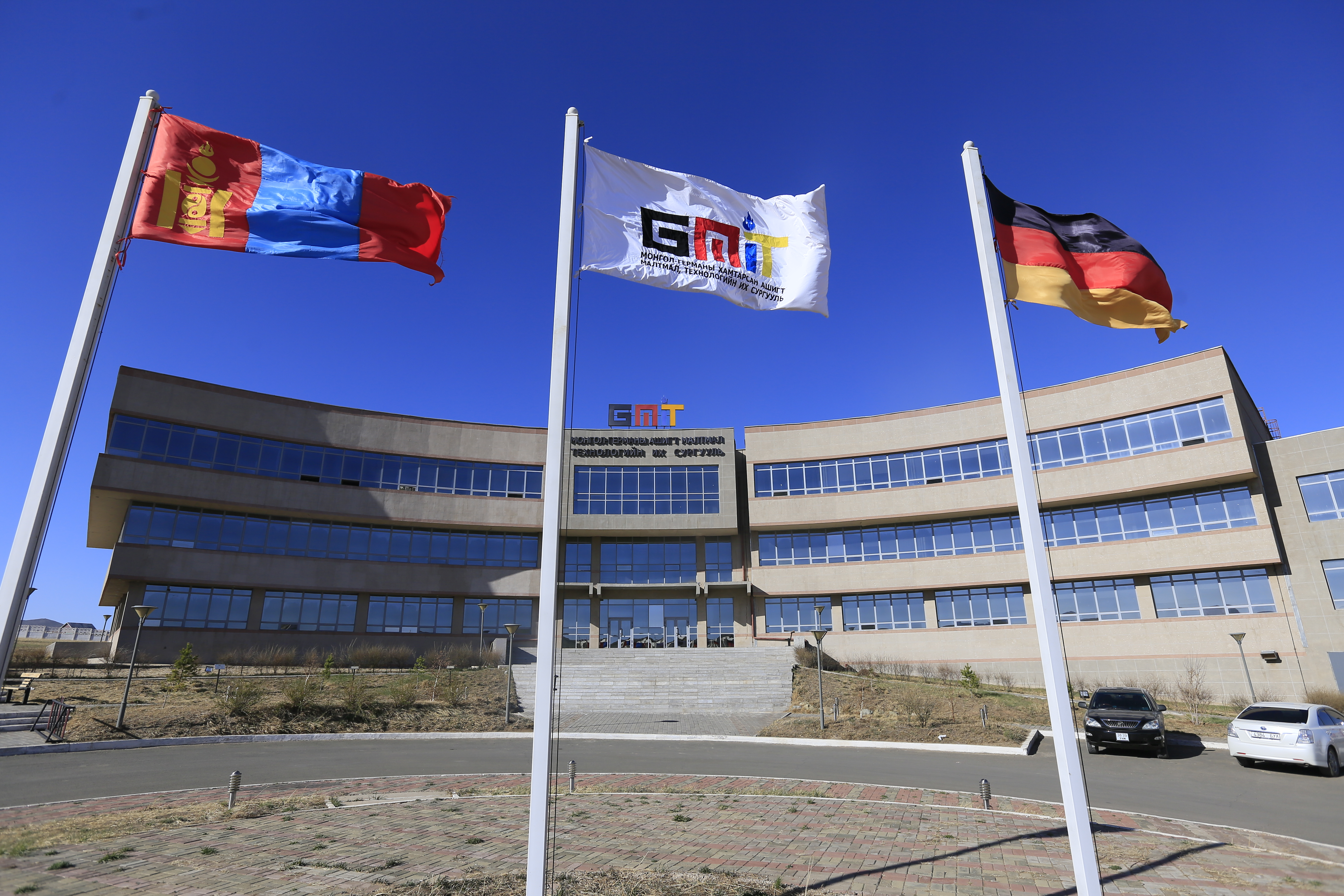
- Motto: German expertise - Mongolian talent
- Type: public university
- Established: 2013; 13 years ago
- Rector: Battsengel Baatar (Rector), Thomas Hollenberg (Vice-Rector for Academic Affairs), Altangerel Lkhamsuren (Vice-Rector for Research), Enkhbayar Bold (Vice-Rector for Finance and Administration)
- Location: Ulaanbaatar Nalaikh district, Mongolia
- Campus: Ulaanbaatar/Nalaikh (main)
- Website: gmit.edu.mn
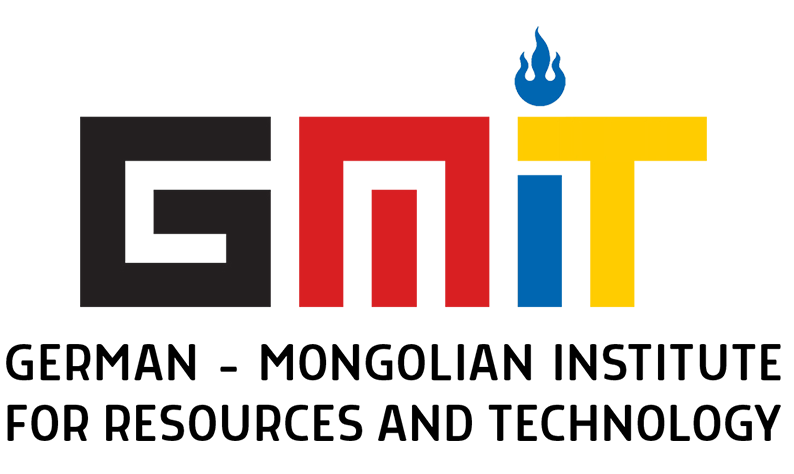

German-Mongolian Institute for Resources and Technology (GMIT; in German: Deutsch-Mongolische Hochschule für Rohstoffe und Technologie, DMHT), was co-founded by German and Mongolian governments based on an agreement which was signed in October 2011 by Mongolian President Tsakhiagiin Elbegdorj and German Chancellor Angela Merkel. GMIT started with its first 35 students in 2013. On June 20, 2018, the first graduation of Bachelor students took place.

As a state-owned university, GMIT has the objective to promote scientific teaching and research in the mining and environmental sector, which are utterly important for the future of Mongolia.

Currently, GMIT offers six Bachelor study programs:
• B.Sc. in Mechanical Engineering
• B.Sc. in Industrial Engineering
• B.Sc. in Environmental Engineering
• B.Sc. in Raw Materials & Process Engineering
• B.Sc. in Mechatronic Engineering
• B.Sc. in Energy and Electrical Engineering

Furthermore, GMIT provides three master's degree programs:
• Executive MBA degree in 'International Management of Resources and Environment'
• MSc. in Advanced Mineral Resources Development
• MSc. in Resources and Technology

Executive MBA degree in 'International Management of Resources and Environment', also known as the "Green MBA", bridges the business-science-environment gap. Additionally, GMIT is a Partner University of the joint master's degree Program (MSc.) "Advanced Mineral Resources Development" in close cooperation with Montanuniversität Leoben (Austria) and TU Bergakademie Freiberg (Germany). The teaching of the Bachelor and Master's study programs is provided by German Experts, as well as by Mongolian Scientists, who obtained their Ph.D. abroad, in Germany or in the USA.

The international character of the university is one of the core characteristics of GMIT, e.g. by using English as language of instruction and by awarding European Credit Transfer and Accumulation System points (ECTS). The other one is the extensive applied and interdisciplinary research in the field of Environmental Sciences, e.g. clean air, clean soil and clean water. Some of the research projects are: GLEAR - Clean Air for Gers, Integrated Water Resource Management, Further Development of Air Quality Monitoring in Ulaanbaatar, Environmental Impacts of Small Scale Mining in Nailakh, Optimization of the Value Chain for Polymineral Ores of Economically Strategic Metals, Thermal Coatings for Tribologically Highly Loaded Machine Parts or Sulfur Removal Process of Coal by Using an efficient Electromechanical Method. In 2018, GMIT expanded its research activities: In order to develop and support young researchers and scientists over the long-term, GMIT initiated a Strategic Research Development Fund.

GMIT students have do internships to gain real-world experiences at international and domestic organizations. To date, over 50 organizations such as private sector, government, and NGO's have made memorandum of understanding and cooperation agreement with GMIT.

The German-Mongolian Institute for Resources and Technology has a close cooperation with five German Universities (TU Bergakademie Freiberg, RWTH Aachen University, Martin-Luther Universität Halle-Wittenberg, Brandenburgische Technische Universität, and Technische Hochschule Georg Agricula Bochum) as well as is supported by the Ministry of Education, Culture, and Science (Mongolia) (in Mongolian: Боловсрол, соёл, шинжлэх ухаан, спортын яам) and by the Federal Ministry for Economic Cooperation and Development (BMZ). The Deutsche Gesellschaft für Internationale Zusammenarbeit (GIZ) and the German Academic Exchange Service (DAAD) are implementing partners. On April 17, 2018, the Ministry of Mining and Heavy Industries established a Memorandum of Cooperation with GMIT to prepare highly educated professionals with international standard training.

The German-Mongolian Institute for Resources and Technology received the International Program Accreditation by ACQUIN (Germany) on March 26, 2019. Furthermore, GMIT was awarded with the Institutional Accreditation by the Mongolian National Council for Education Accreditation (MNCEA) on July 4, 2019.
