= Kevin O'Connor (cricketer) =

New Zealand cricketer (born 1940)

Kevin James O'Connor (born 20 June 1940) is a New Zealand former cricketer who played six first-class matches for Otago, three in each of the 1969–70 and 1970–71 seasons.

O'Connor was born at Dunedin in Otago in 1940. He played age-group cricket for Otago during the 1959–60 season and played for Southland between 1960–61 and 1976–77, including 23 Hawke Cup matches. His first-class debut for Otago came on Christmas Day 1969 against Central Districts. Opening the batting, O'Connor scored 17 in his first innings, described by The Press as "a brief, energetic innings" which include him hooking the first ball of the match for four runs. He scored a further five runs in his second innings and went on to play in two more of Otago's Plunket Shield matches during the season. He played a further three matches the following season, scoring a total of 252 runs, including a score of 71 runs made against Canterbury in January 1970, his only first-class half-century.
