= Conor O'Sullivan =

Conor O'Sullivan may refer to:

- Conor O'Sullivan (hurler) (born 1989), Irish hurler
- Conor O'Sullivan (make-up artist), make-up artist
- Conor O'Sullivan (rugby league), Irish rugby player

== See also ==
- Connor O'Sullivan (born 2005), Australian rules footballer
