= David Conner =

David Conner may refer to:

== People ==
- David Conner (bishop) (born 1947), Dean of Windsor and Bishop to the Armed Forces
- David Conner (naval officer) (1792–1856), officer of the United States Navy
- David Conner (businessman), former CEO of Oversea-Chinese Banking Corporation

== Fictional characters ==
- Dr. David Conner, Alter ego of the Eradicator (comics), a DC comics character

== See also ==
- David Connor (disambiguation)
