= Justice O'Connor =

Justice O'Connor may refer to:

- Deirdre O'Connor (1941–2024), judge of the Federal Court of Australia
- Dennis O'Connor (judge) (fl. 1970s–2010s), associate chief justice of Ontario on the Ontario Court of Appeal
- Earl Eugene O'Connor (1922–1998), associate justice of the Kansas Supreme Court
- Kenneth O'Connor (1896–1985), chief justice of Jamaica and later of Kenya
- Maureen O'Connor (judge) (born 1951), chief justice of the Supreme Court of Ohio
- Richard Edward O'Connor (1851–1912), justice of the High Court of Australia
- Sandra Day O'Connor (1930–2023), associate justice of the United States Supreme Court

== See also ==
- Judge O'Connor (disambiguation)
- Justice Connor (disambiguation)
