= Mac Conner =

American artist and illustrator (1913–2019)

McCauley Conner
- Born: November 12, 1913; Newport, New Jersey
- Died: September 26, 2019 (aged 105); Manhattan, New York
- Occupations: Commercial Artist; Illustrator
- Years active: 1930–2019

McCauley Conner (November 12, 1913 – September 26, 2019) was an American commercial illustrator who was called "one of the original Mad Men". He turned 100 in November 2013.

Mac Conner was born as Julian McCauley Conner to his parents, Ross C. Conner and Maude, and grew up in Newport, New Jersey. His parents operated a general store in Downes Township, New Jersey. By 1940, Mac Conner was operating a commercial art business.
