= Joe Connor =

Joe or Joseph Connor may refer to:

- Joe Connor (baseball) (1874–1957), American baseball player
- Joe Connor (footballer, born 1877) (1877–1934), Irish footballer
- Joe Connor (footballer, born 1986), English footballer

== See also ==
- Joe Connors (1862–1891), American baseball player
- Joseph Connors (born 1945), American art historian
- Joseph Conners (born 1987), British professional wrestler
- L. Joseph Connors (1930–2018), American politician, lawyer, and businessman
- Connor Joe (born 1992), American baseball player
- Joseph William Conner (1870–1937), American politician
