= Michael Patrick O'Connor =

American linguist

Michael P. O'Connor
- Born: Michael Patrick O'Connor; April 7, 1950; Lackawanna, New York, US
- Died: June 16, 2007 (aged 56–57); Silver Spring, Maryland, US
- Education: Bachelor of Arts in English (1970); Master of Arts in creative writing (1972); Doctorate in Near Eastern studies (1978)
- Alma mater: University of Michigan
- Occupations: Linguist, Poet, lecturer, and professor
- Known for: Ancient Near East studies, Biblical Hebrew

Michael Patrick O'Connor (1950, Lackawanna, New York – June 16, 2007, Silver Spring, Maryland) was an American scholar of the Ancient Near East and a poet. With the field of ANE studies he was a linguist of Semitic languages, with a focus on biblical Hebrew and biblical poetry.

O'Connor received his bachelor's degree in English from the University of Notre Dame in 1970, and a Masters in creative writing from the University of British Columbia in 1972, followed by a Masters in ancient Near Eastern studies (1974) and doctorate in 1978 at the University of Michigan.

After working as a freelance scholar for a number of years, he taught at Saint Paul Seminary School of Divinity of the University of St. Thomas then at Union Theological Seminary. In 1997 he joined the faculty of Catholic University of America and was appointed an Ordinary Professor in 2002.

He is best known from his book on the structure of Hebrew verse and his co-authorship of a textbook on biblical Hebrew syntax. He proposed that the metre of Hebrew verse was based on constraints in syntax, rather than feet.

He published poems throughout his career, including a book of poetry called Pandary in 1989.

O'Connor was a Catholic, he died of complications of liver cancer on June 16, 2007, at Holy Cross Hospital in Silver Spring, MD.

== Selected publications ==
Books

- O'Connor, Michael Patrick (1978). Hebrew Verse Structure, Volume 1. Eisenbrauns. ISBN 9780931464027. OCLC 1024739048. The 2nd Edition was printed with a new afterword: O'Connor, Michael Patrick (1997). The contours of biblical Hebrew verse: an afterword to Hebrew verse structure. Eisenbrauns. OCLC 42665662.
- O'Connor, Michael Patrick; Waltke, Bruce K. (1990). An Introduction to Biblical Hebrew Syntax. Eisenbrauns. p. 765. ISBN 9780931464317.

Edited books

- Meyers, Carol L.; O'Connor, M., eds. (1983). The Word of the Lord shall go forth : essays in honor of David Noel Freedman in celebration of his sixtieth birthday. American Schools of Oriental Research, No. 1. Winona Lake, IN: Eisenbrauns. ISBN 978-0-931464-19-5. OCLC 781579587.
- O'Connor, Michael Patrick; Freedman, David Noel, eds. (1987). Backgrounds for the Bible. Winona Lake, Ind.: Eisenbrauns. ISBN 978-0931464300. OCLC 869179345. Note: Includes essays originally published in Michigan Quarterly Review XXII (3). Summer 1983, a special issue called The Bible and Its Traditions.
- Menn, Lise; O'Connor, Michael P.; Obler, Loraine K.; Holland, Audrey, eds. (1995). Non-fluent aphasia in a multilingual world. Amsterdam [u.a.]: Benjamins. ISBN 9781556193910.

Papers

- O'Connor, M (1977). "The Grammar of Getting Blessed in Tyrian-Sidonian Phoenician". Rivista di Studi Fenici. 5: 5–11. ISSN 0390-3877.
- O'Connor, M. (1977). "The Rhetoric of the Kilamuwa Inscription". Bulletin of the American Schools of Oriental Research. 226 (226): 15–29. doi:10.2307/1356572. JSTOR 1356572. S2CID 155257839.
- O'Connor, M (1982). "'Unanswerable the knack of tongues': The linguistic Study of Verse.". In Obler, Loraine K.; Menn, Lise (eds.). Exceptional language and linguistics. New York: Academic Press. pp. 143–168. ISBN 9780125236805.
- O'Connor, M. (1983). "Writing Systems, Native Speaker Analyses, and the Earliest Stages of Northwest Semitic Orthography". In Meyers, Carol L.; O'Connor, M. (eds.). The Word of the Lord shall go forth : essays in honor of David Noel Freedman in celebration of his sixtieth birthday. American Schools of Oriental Research, No. 1. Winona Lake, IN: Eisenbrauns. ISBN 978-0-931464-19-5. OCLC 781579587.
- O'Connor, M. (1986). "The Arabic Loanwords in Nabatean Aramaic". Journal of Near Eastern Studies. 45 (3): 213–229. doi:10.1086/373188. JSTOR 544859. S2CID 161392170.
- O'Connor, M. (1987). "The Poetic Inscription from Khirbet el-Qôm". Vetus Testamentum. 37 (2): 224–230. doi:10.2307/1517722. JSTOR 1517722.
- O'Connor, Michael Patrick (1987). "Ugarit and the Bible". In O'Connor, Michael Patrick; Freedman, David Noel (eds.). Backgrounds for the Bible. Winona Lake, Ind.: Eisenbrauns. pp. 151–164. ISBN 978-0931464300. OCLC 869179345.
- O'Connor, M. (1989). "Semitic *mgn and Its Supposed Sanskrit Origin". Journal of the American Oriental Society. 109 (1): 25–32. doi:10.2307/604334. JSTOR 604334.
- O'Connor, M. (1986). "'I only am escaped alone to tell thee': Native American and Biblical Hebrew Verse". Religion & Intellectual Life. 3: 121–32.
- O'Connor, Michael Patrick (1986). "The Women in the Book of Judges". Hebrew Annual Review. 10: 277–293. hdl:1811/58724.
- O'Connor, Michael Patrick (1987). "Chapter 9: The Pseudosorites: A Type of Paradox in Hebrew Verse". In Follis, Elaine R. (ed.). Directions in Biblical Hebrew Poetry. Supplement Series No. 40. Sheffield, England: JSOT Press. pp. 161–172. ISBN 978-1850750130.
- O'Connor, M (1995). "War and Rebel Chants in the Former Prophets". In Beck, Astrid B.; Bartelt, Andrew H.; Raabe, Paul R.; Franke, Chris A. (eds.). Fortunate the eyes that see : essays in honor of David Noel Freedman in celebration of his seventieth birthday. Grand Rapids: Eerdmans. pp. 343–358. ISBN 978-0802838018. OCLC 32465390.
- O'Connor, M. P. (1999). "Biblical Hebrew Lexicography: טף 'Children, Dependents' in Biblical and Qumranic Hebrew". Journal of Northwest Semitic Languages (2): 25–40. (Table of contents with abstracts)
- O'Connor, M.P. (2002). "Semitic Lexicography: European Dictionaries of Biblical Hebrew in the Twentieth Century". In izreʹel, Shlomo (ed.). Semitic linguistics : the state of the art at the turn of the twenty-first century. Israel Oriental Studies, Volume 20. [Winona Lake, Ind.]: Eisenbrauns. ISBN 978-1-57506-059-0.
- O'Connor, M. (2004). "The Onomastic Evidence for Bronze-Age West Semitic". Journal of the American Oriental Society. 124 (3): 439–470. doi:10.2307/4132275. JSTOR 4132275.
- O'Connor, Michael Patrick (2008). "Chapter 1: The Biblical Notion of the City". In Camp, Claudia V.; Berquist, Jon L. (eds.). Constructions of space II : the biblical city and other imagined spaces. The Library of Hebrew Bible/Old Testament Studies No. 490. London: T & T Clark. ISBN 9780567027085. OCLC 234257147.
- O'Connor, MP; Greenstein, E.L. (2012). "Parallelism". In Greene, Roland; Cushman, Stephen (eds.). The Princeton encyclopedia of poetry and poetics (4th. ed.). Princeton: Princeton University Press. pp. 997–999. ISBN 9781400841424.

Reviews

- O'Connor, Michael Patrick (1991). "Review of The Affirming Flame: Religion, Language, Literature". South Central Review. 8 (1): 116–118. doi:10.2307/3189323. JSTOR 3189323.
- O'Connor, Michael P. (1991). "Review of Procedimientos iterativos en la poesía ugarítica y hebrea (BibOr 43)". The Catholic Biblical Quarterly. 53 (3): 486–488. JSTOR 43718306.
- O'Connor, M. (1992). "Review of Studies in Verbal Aspect and Narrative Technique in Biblical Hebrew Prose". Journal of the American Oriental Society. 112 (3): 497–499. doi:10.2307/603094. JSTOR 603094.
- O'Connor, Michael P.; Bouzard, Walter C. (1999). "Review of We Have Heard with Our Ears, O God: Sources of the Communal Laments in the Psalms (SBLDS 159), Walter C. Bouzard, Jr". The Catholic Biblical Quarterly. 61 (4): 737–739. JSTOR 43723712.
- O'Connor, Michael Patrick (1998). "Book Review: Ecclesiastes: A New Translation with Introduction and Commentary. By Seow C. L., Anchor Bible. New York: Doubleday, 1997" (PDF). Theological Studies. 59 (4): 722–723. doi:10.1177/004056399805900408. S2CID 170849670.
- O'Connor, M. (2003). "Grammatical Concepts 101 for Biblical Hebrew: Learning Biblical Hebrew Grammatical Concepts Through English Grammar (review)". Hebrew Studies. 44 (1): 234–238. doi:10.1353/hbr.2003.0025. S2CID 170163135.
- O'Connor, Michael P. (2001). "Review of "The alphabet versus the goddess: The conflict between word and image" by Leonard Shlain". Written Language & Literacy. 4 (1): 87–95. doi:10.1075/wll.4.1.07oco.
- O'Connor, M. (March 2005). "Hester. Fascicule 1. Introduction". Theological Studies. 66 (1): 224. doi:10.1177/004056390506600136. S2CID 220517504.
- O'Connor, M. (July 2006). "Review: The Empty Men: The Heroic Tradition of Ancient Israel". The Catholic Biblical Quarterly. 68 (3): 521–523. JSTOR 43727597.
- O'Connor, M. (2001). "Review of Biblia Hebraica Leningradensia. Prepared according to the Vocalization, Accents, and Masora of Aaron ben Moses ben Asher in the Leningrad Codex". The Catholic Biblical Quarterly. 63 (4): 716–718. JSTOR 43727261.

Poetry

- O'Connor, Michael Patrick (1989). Pandary : poems. Seattle, WA: L'Epervier Press. ISBN 978-0934332507. OCLC 732345895.
- O'Connor, Michael Patrick (1971). "The News of the World for Therese: 1. The Ideas of August; 2. Two Days Later; 3. Immediately". The Iowa Review. 2 (3): 13. doi:10.17077/0021-065X.1216. JSTOR 20157735.
- O'Connor, Michael Patrick (1973). "The Aphrodite of Melos". The Transatlantic Review (45): 131. JSTOR 41513310.
- O'Connor, Michael Patrick (1984). "Envoi on Our Failure". The Great Lakes Review. 10 (2): 42. doi:10.2307/20172697. JSTOR 20172697.
- O'Connor, Michael Patrick (2009). Field notes: the selected poems of Michael Patrick O'Connor. Patsons Press. ISBN 9780982415115. OCLC 755031166.
