= Conners =

Conners is a surname. Notable people include:

- Bob Conners (1933–2014), American radio personality
- Corey Conners (born 1992), Canadian golfer
- Dan Conners (1941–2019), American football player
- Erika Conners, American politician
- Gene Conners (1930–2010), American trombonist and singer
- Jack Conners (born 1943), American politician
- Joseph Conners (born 1987), English wrestler
- Keith Conners (1933–2017), American psychologist
- Paige Conners (born 2000), Israeli-American pair figure skater

== See also ==
- Connors (surname)
- Conner (surname)
- The Conners
