= Jimmy O'Connor =

Irish footballer

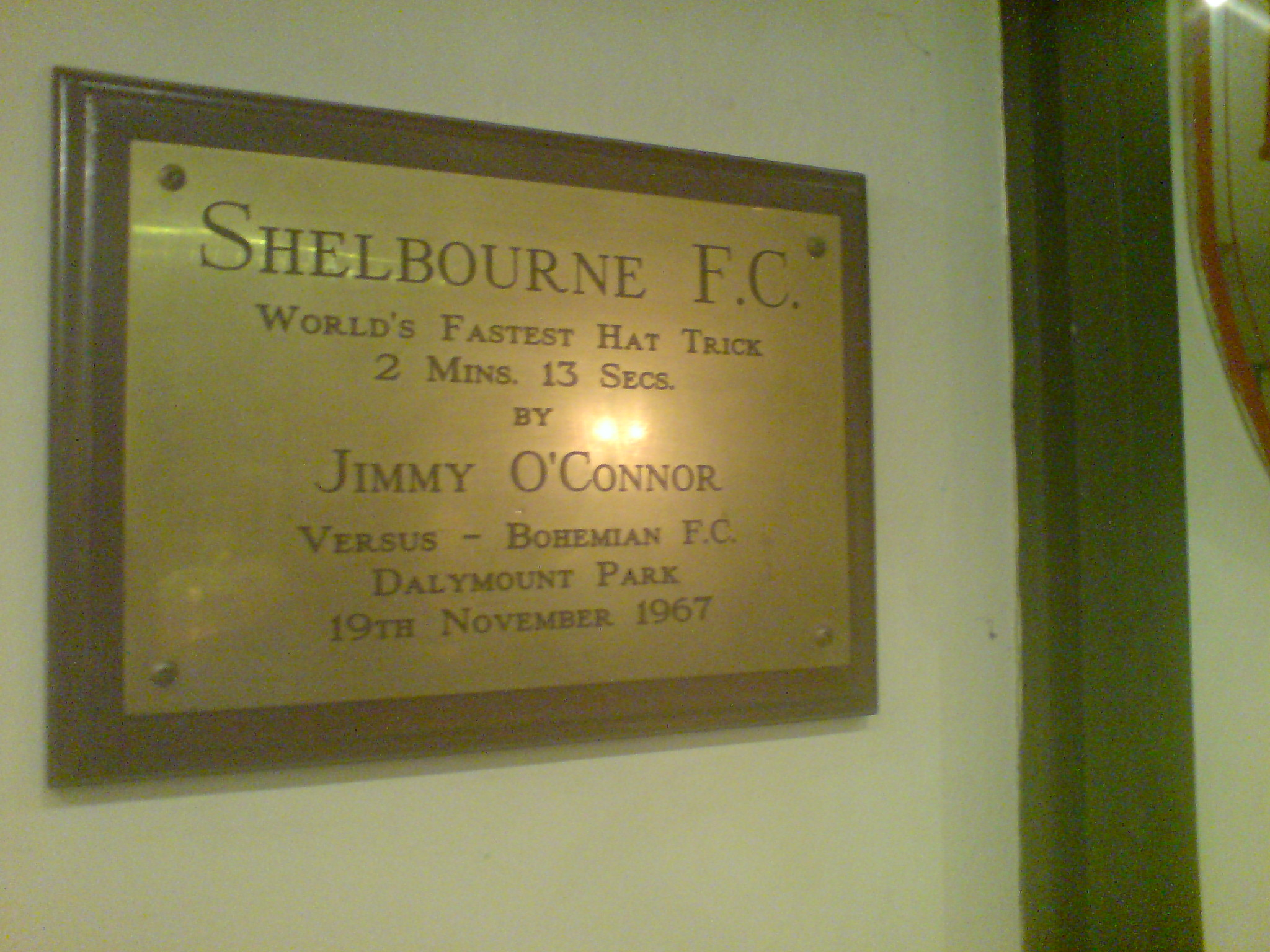
The commemorative plaque in Tolka Park, detailing the quickest hattrick ever, as scored by Jimmy O'Connor on 19 November 1967

Jimmy O'Connor is an Irish former footballer notable for being the fastest hat-trick scorer in top level domestic league history. He scored three goals for Shelbourne in 2 minutes and 13 seconds, versus Bohemians at Dalymount Park on 19 November 1967.

Then 19 years of age, O’Connor's three goals won the match for his team after they went two goals down against their Dublin rivals.

A forward, O'Connor made 109 league appearances, scoring 26 goals, with Shels from 1965–66 to 1971–72.

His son Barry O'Connor also played in the League of Ireland scoring 107 goals in his career.
