= Operation Netwing =

UK police investigation into forced labour and human trafficking

Operation Netwing is a long-running United Kingdom law enforcement endeavour, headed by Bedfordshire and Hertfordshire Major Crime Unit (BHMCU), investigating allegations of forced labour and human trafficking in Bedfordshire, England by Irish Travellers.

BHMCU is the first combined major crime investigation team in the UK, composed of officers from Bedfordshire Police and Hertfordshire Constabulary, established to "give greater capacity for responding to the most serious crimes."

== Background ==
Little Billington shown within Bedfordshire

In April 2011, a man complained to Bedfordshire Police that he had been "enslaved, frequently beaten and threatened with more violence after being offered work outside a job centre." The allegations centred on Greenacres Caravan Park, an Irish Traveller site in Little Billington, Bedfordshire.

The allegations led to the launch of the operation, which began with several months of undercover observation and covert intelligence gathering, involving the Serious Organised Crime Agency's Human Trafficking Centre. Police concluded the site was "the hub of a multi-million pound trafficking operation that spans beyond the UK", and that some of the men may have been moved to Scandinavia and other parts of Europe to work. During 2011 police forces from four other counties in England raided Irish Traveller sites in connection with forced labour and human trafficking.

== Greenacres Caravan Park raid ==
At 0530 UTC on 11 September 2011, approximately 100 police officers from BHMCU and other specialist units including the dog section, force helicopter and Authorised Firearms Officers, raided the caravan park to execute search warrants. As a result, four men and one woman were arrested and a further 24 men, all believed to be victims of slavery, were taken from the site.

The arrests were made under the provisions of Section 71 of the Coroners and Justice Act 2009, implemented in April 2010 to comply with Article 4 of the European Convention on Human Rights, which made it a criminal offence to hold someone "in slavery or servitude, or requir[e] them to perform forced or compulsory labour." The youngest of the 24 was a 17-year-old boy, who, when released, returned to his family. Nine of the freed men later discharged themselves from hospital and refused to assist police. One of the nine accused the police of heavy-handed tactics, saying he had lived on the caravan site for several years working as a paver for £50 a day, claiming many of the other men were similarly paid.

Initial news reports claimed that the police had been warned 28 previous times that captives were being held at the caravan park, or that 28 captives escaped, but officers explained that this was "a misunderstanding", and that the witness whose allegation had launched the operation in April had told them that 28 people were still being held as slaves. Most of the 24 were said to have been homeless or suffering from alcoholism. Police also found drugs, money and weapons during the raid.

Of the fifteen freed men helping police, eight were of British nationality, three Polish, one Latvian and one Lithuanian, with two men of unconfirmed nationality, and ranged in age from 30 to 57 years. They were being housed temporarily at a British Red Cross rest centre set up to provide shelter for them while alternative accommodation was found and other necessary arrangements made. A Red Cross spokesperson said: "Our emergency response volunteers are offering emotional support and giving the men any practical help they need, such as clothing and hygiene kits. We have also provided recreational activities such as games, a radio and DVDs."

On 12 September 2011, the Crown Prosecution Service (CPS) announced that Tommy Connors (30), Patrick Connors (19), James Connors (34) and James Connors (23) had been charged with "conspiracy to hold a person in servitude and requiring them to perform forced labour" and were remanded in custody to appear at Luton Magistrates' Court on 13 September 2011. A spokesman CPS Thames and Chiltern Complex Casework Unit explained: "These charges relate to four victims who allege they have been held against their will and forced to live and work like slaves." A fifth person arrested, a woman, Josie Connors (aged 30), whom police revealed was pregnant, was originally released on police bail to be questioned further following the "imminent" birth of her child. However, on 15 September, she was charged with four offences related to activities at the Greenacres site. At a subsequent hearing, on 22 September, she was remanded on bail until 5 December 2011, on condition that she remained at home and only left to give birth at Stoke Mandeville Hospital, Aylesbury.

Speaking on 12 September Detective Chief Inspector (DCI) Sean O'Neil of BHMCU said: "I am confident that while the investigation is in its early stages this is a family-run 'business' and is an organised crime group that has been broken up by the Netwing operation." DCI O'Neil explained: "Some of these people have come out covered in excrement and dirty clothing because that was all they were allowed to live in. After being cared for, given food and fresh clothing, we hope to then interview them. That in itself will take a long time because these people are institutionalized. One person we know has been here fifteen years, so to him this is normal life."

On 21 September 2011, three further arrests took place at the caravan park. One of those arrested, Johnny Connors (30), was charged later that day with four offences including conspiracy to hold someone in servitude, and conspiracy to require someone to perform forced labour. The other two arrested were a woman (61) remanded in custody, and a man (51) who was released on police bail pending medical treatment. Tommy Conners (senior; aged 51) was subsequently charged on 3 October 2011 with 11 offences of conspiracy to place people in servitude or forced labour.

On 5 December 2011, 7 people arrested in this case appeared at Luton Crown Court on 16 counts of conspiracy to hold a person in servitude and requiring a person to perform forced labour. They are:

- Tommy Connors, Sr. (51)
- Johnny Connors (30; son of Tommy)
- Josie Connors (30; daughter of Tommy)
- James Connors (33; son-in-law of Tommy)
- Tommy Connors, Jr. (26, son of Tommy)
- James (Jimmy) Connors (23; son of Tommy)
- Patrick Connors (19; son of Tommy)

Only Josie was released on bail and the rest were kept in custody. On 11 July 2012, Tommy Connors senior, James John Connors, Patrick Connors, and Josie Connors were convicted of controlling, exploiting, verbally abusing and beating the men for financial gain at the caravan site near Leighton Buzzard in Bedfordshire. The trial lasted 13 weeks.

== Reactions ==
Andrew Selous, MP for South West Bedfordshire, told the House of Commons: "Following this weekend's utterly despicable revelations of the way in which twenty-four of my constituents have been kept as slaves, some for fifteen years, I'd like to commend the robust action of Bedfordshire Police in bringing this to light", and asked the Government to "pay particular attention to the issue of internal trafficking within the UK, given that seventeen of these twenty-four slaves were British citizens." Damian Green MP, Minister of State for Immigration said the incident "came as a shock to many of us. What we saw was effective police action, co-ordinated in many ways by the Serious Organised Crime Agency. The new National Crime Agency (NCA) will have among its functions co-ordinating activity against trafficking, both domestic and international, which will give us a much more effective way of combating this particularly vile crime."

Klara Skrivankova, Trafficking Programme Coordinator at Anti-Slavery International, said: "Slavery and this case which appears to be a case of forced labour is a reality in Britain today but I think what it shows to us is that the police have finally been given proper powers in the new law that has been mentioned in order to investigate and really go after those who are still behaving like slave-masters in the 21st century."

In an article on 16 April 2008, Dr Donald Kenrick, an expert on the Romany language, is quoted as saying "Dossers are people gipsies pick up to work for them. They are sometimes called slaves or servants. ... It is common among Irish travellers, but the English do it as well." However he disputed that they were really slaves, saying that the practice meant that otherwise vulnerable people were being cared for. He said the travellers favoured single men, who were strong workers, but of poor mental health.

== Other related raids at Traveller sites ==
The 2011 series of police investigations on Travellers' sites began after the decomposed body of Christopher Nicholls, missing since 2005, was found in March 2008 near the Beggars Roost caravan site in Staverton, Gloucestershire.

=== Enderby and Pleasley ===
Around 27 March 2011, simultaneous raids were carried out at Traveller sites in Enderby, Leicestershire, where eight alleged slaves were found, and Pleasley, Derbyshire, where seven alleged slaves were found. William Connors' son John Connors was arrested at the Pleasley site, and his son-in-law Miles Connors at the Enderby site.

=== Hamble ===
On 24 June 2011, John Conners (26), Jerry Conners (19), and Eileen Conners (59) were arrested and charged with offences under section 71 of the Coroners and Justice Act 2009 after 120 police officers raided a Travellers' site at Hamble, Hampshire to execute a series of warrants as part of Operation Helm.

=== Pulmer Water ===
On 16 September 2011, 50 police raided a travellers' camp at Pulmer Water near Codicote, Hertfordshire, and there found and removed four Chinese nationals (3 men and a woman) and two British men who were suspected of being held as slaves. It is suspected that the four Chinese were illegally trafficked into Britain.

== Previously reported cases of enslavement on Traveller sites ==
=== Crays Hill ===
In a court case in May 1999 one John Williams described how the previous year he was taken from London to Basildon, forced to work all day and then locked in a stable at Crays Hill. He was threatened and told he would have to stay for 6 months but managed to escape the next day.

=== Hargnies, Mauberge, France ===
In Hargnies, near Mauberge in northeast France on 14 December 2005, eight travellers were arrested for keeping six slaves and using them for forced harvest work.

== See also ==
- Debt bondage
