= Jennifer O'Connor (netball) =

Australian netball player

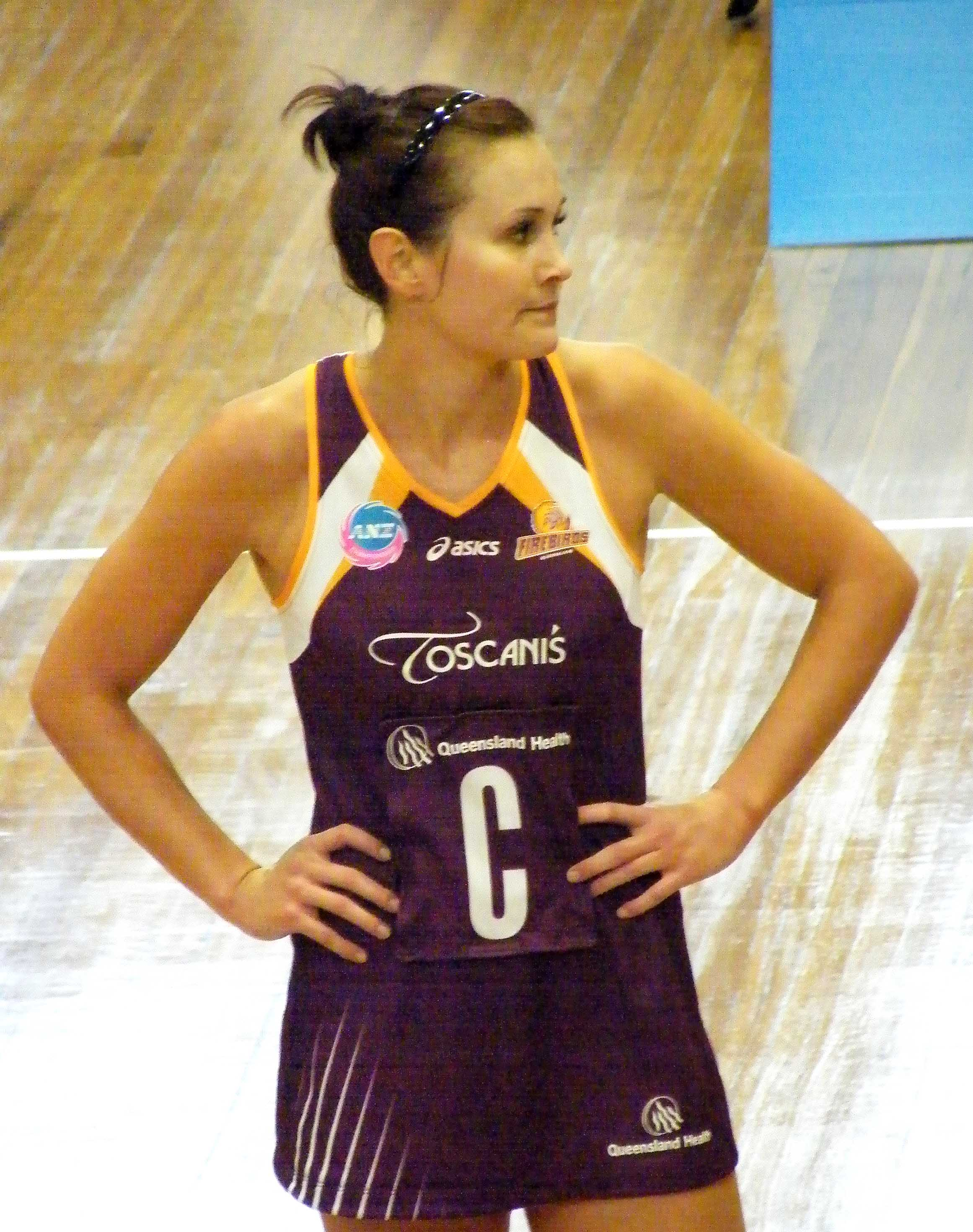

Personal information
- Born: 13 April 1984 (age 42) Bundaberg, Queensland
- Height: 1.77 m (5 ft 10 in)

Netball career
- Playing positions: C, WD, WA
Years	Club team	Apps
2006–09	Queensland Firebirds	
- Updated on 10 April 2010

Jennifer O'Connor (born 13 April 1984 in Bundaberg, Australia) is an Australian netball player. She played with the Queensland Firebirds from 2006 to 2007 in the Commonwealth Bank Trophy, and from 2008 to 2009 in the ANZ Championship.
