= Jack Conner (footballer, born 1891) =

Scottish footballer

Personal information
- Date of birth: 27 December 1891
- Place of birth: Rutherglen, Scotland
- Position: Forward

Youth career
- 1910–1911: Centre Half Holiday
- 1911: Perth Violet
- 1911–1912: Perth Co-operative

Senior career*
Years	Team	Apps	(Gls)
1912–1914	Sunderland	5	(2)
1914–1919	Distillery		
1919–1922	Crystal Palace	61	(37)
1922–1924	Newport County	85	(26)
1924–1925	Bristol City	16	(3)
1925–1926	Millwall	2	(0)
1926	Chatham		
1926–1927	Yeovil & Petters United		
1927–1929	Southend United	0	(0)
1929–19??	Yeovil & Petters United		
- * Club domestic league appearances and goals

John Conner (27 December 1891 – ?) was a Scottish professional footballer who played as a forward for Sunderland.
