= James Connors =

James Connors may refer to:

- James Connors (Medal of Honor) (1838–?), Irish born Union Army soldier during the American Civil War
- James H. Connors (died 1941), American horse racing executive and businessman
- Jim Connors (1946–2024), American politician
- Jimmy Connors (born 1952), American tennis player
- Jimmy Connors, American welterweight boxer and brother of mobster Edward G. Connors

== See also ==
- James Connor (disambiguation)
