= USS Jean Sands =

Tugboat of the United States Navy

History

United States
- Ordered: as Peter B. Van Houten
- Laid down: date unknown
- Launched: 1863
- Acquired: 18 October 1864
- In service: 1864 (est.)
- Out of service: 1892 (est.)
- Stricken: 1892 (est.)
- Homeport: Norfolk Navy Yard
- Fate: Sold, 16 May 1892

General characteristics
- Displacement: 139 tons
- Length: 102 ft (31 m)
- Beam: 22 ft 8 in (6.91 m)
- Depth of hold: 6 ft 2 in (1.88 m)
- Propulsion: steam engine; screw-propelled
- Speed: not known
- Complement: not known
- Armament: none

USS Jean Sands was a steamer acquired by the Union Navy during the American Civil War. She was used by the Union Navy as a tugboat and salvage vessel in support of the Union Navy.

== Service career ==
Jean Sands was built at Brooklyn, New York, in 1863 and was purchased by the Navy at New York City from T. F. Rowland 18 October 1864. She was stationed at the Norfolk Navy Yard where she served as a tug and salvage vessel. Jean Sands was sold 16 May 1892.
