= O'Conner =

O'Conner is a variant form of the Irish surname O'Connor.

== Notable people with this name ==
- Elizabeth O'Conner (1913–2000), Australian novelist, born Barbara Willard Lowe
- Pat O'Conner (born 1958), American Minor League Baseball executive
- Patricia T. O'Conner (born 1949), American author of books on English

== Fictional characters ==
- Brian O'Conner in The Fast and the Furious film series

== See also ==
- O'Connor
