= Sandra Day O'Connor (disambiguation) =

Sandra Day O'Connor (1930–2023) was a U.S. Supreme Court justice, the first woman on the court.

Sandra Day O'Connor may also refer to:

== Places ==
- Sandra Day O'Connor United States Courthouse, Phoenix, Arizona, U.S.; named after the eponymous SCOTUS judge
- Sandra Day O'Connor High School (disambiguation), several schools named after the eponymous SCOTUS judge
- Sandra Day O'Connor House, Arizona, U.S.; an NRHP-listed building, the historic house of the eponymous SCOTUS judge, originally located in Paradise Valley, Arizona, before being moved to Tempe, Arizona

== Other uses ==
- Sandra Day O'Connor Institute (founded 2009), Phoenix, Arizona, U.S.; a non-profit founded by the eponymous SCOTUS judge to continue her work
- Sandra Day O'Connor College of Law, Arizona State University, Phoenix, Arizona, U.S.; named after the eponymous SCOTUS judge

== See also ==
- List of awards and honors received by Sandra Day O'Connor, including other namesakes
- Sandra (given name)
- O'Connor (surname)
- Day (surname)
- O'Connor (disambiguation)
- Sandra (disambiguation)
- Day (disambiguation)
