= John Jay O'Connor =

American lawyer (1930–2009)

- O'Connor in 2004
- Born: John Jay O'Connor III; January 10, 1930; San Francisco, California, U.S.
- Died: November 11, 2009 (aged 79); Phoenix, Arizona, U.S.
- Education: Stanford University (BA, LLB)
- Occupation: Lawyer
- Spouse: Sandra Day (m. 1952)
- Children: 3

John Jay O'Connor III (January 10, 1930 – November 11, 2009) was an American lawyer and the husband of the United States Supreme Court Associate Justice Sandra Day O'Connor, the first woman to serve on the court. O'Connor, a prominent lawyer in Arizona, suffered from Alzheimer's disease during his later life. His illness played a significant role in Sandra Day O'Connor's 2005 decision to retire from the Supreme Court.

== Life and career ==
O'Connor was born on January 10, 1930 in San Francisco, to John Jay O'Connor II and the former Sally Flynn. He was of Irish Catholic descent and attended St. Ignatius High School. He obtained his bachelor's degree from Stanford University in 1951, and later received a law degree, also from Stanford, in 1953.

O'Connor met his future wife, Sandra Day, while both were law review editors and students at Stanford Law School. The couple married in 1952 and had three sons.

O'Connor served within the U.S. Army Judge Advocate General's Corp following his graduation from law school. He was stationed in Frankfurt, West Germany, from 1954 until 1956. Sandra was employed in the Quartermaster Corps as a civilian lawyer.

O'Connor returned to the United States and moved to Phoenix. There he joined the law firm of Fennemore, Craig, von Ammon, McClennen & Udall. Following his wife's appointment to the United States Supreme Court by President Ronald Reagan, O'Connor moved with his family to Washington, D.C. He continued to practice law with two firms, Miller & Chevalier and Bryan Cave, while living in Washington.

O'Connor was diagnosed with Alzheimer's nearly twenty years before his death. His deteriorating health played a significant role in Sandra's decision to retire from the Supreme Court in 2005.

O'Connor died of Alzheimer's disease on November 11, 2009, at a nursing home in Phoenix, aged 79.
