= Harry Rathbun =

- Born: 14 June 1894
- Died: September 28, 1987 (aged 93); Palo Alto, California

Harry John Rathbun was a professor of business law at Stanford University who had a profound influence on a generation of students, with former Supreme Court Justice Sandra Day O'Connor crediting him with being the key intellectual and spiritual influence in her life.

With his wife, Emilia, he founded the Creative Initiative Foundation (now closed) which morphed during the 1980s into the Beyond War Foundation (also now closed).

Rathbun was born June 14, 1894, in Mitchell, South Dakota, United States, and died September 28, 1987, in Palo Alto, California.
