= List of awards and honors received by Sandra Day O'Connor =

Sandra Day O'Connor was an American jurist. O'Connor was first woman to serve as a United States Supreme Court Justice. President Ronald Reagan nominated O'Connor in 1981. She continued to serve as a justice until she retired in 2006.

== Institutions and buildings ==
- Sandra Day O’Connor High School, a public high school in Helotes, Texas.
- Austin High School in El Paso, Texas, honored O'Connor by naming a magnet school located on the Austin campus the Sandra Day O'Connor Criminal Justice/Public Service Academy, in her honor.
- Sandra Day O'Connor High School, located in the Deer Valley School District in North Phoenix, is named in her honor.
- Sandra Day O’Connor Elementary School, located in Arizona's Mesa school district .
- The federal courthouse in Phoenix, dedicated in 2000, is named in her honor.
- In 2004, O'Connor received the U.S. Senator John Heinz Award for Greatest Public Service by an Elected or Appointed Official, an award given out annually by Jefferson Awards.
- On September 8, 2004, Redwood City, California, dedicated the courtroom of its renovated historical courthouse (now a museum) to O'Connor.
- On January 2, 2006, she served as grand marshal at the 117th annual Tournament of Roses Parade in Pasadena, California. She started the 92nd annual Rose Bowl Game with a coin toss on January 4. Coincidentally, the parade was conducted in heavy rain for the first time since 1955, when the Grand Marshal had been then-Chief Justice Earl Warren.
- On April 5, 2006, Arizona State University renamed its law school the Sandra Day O'Connor College of Law.

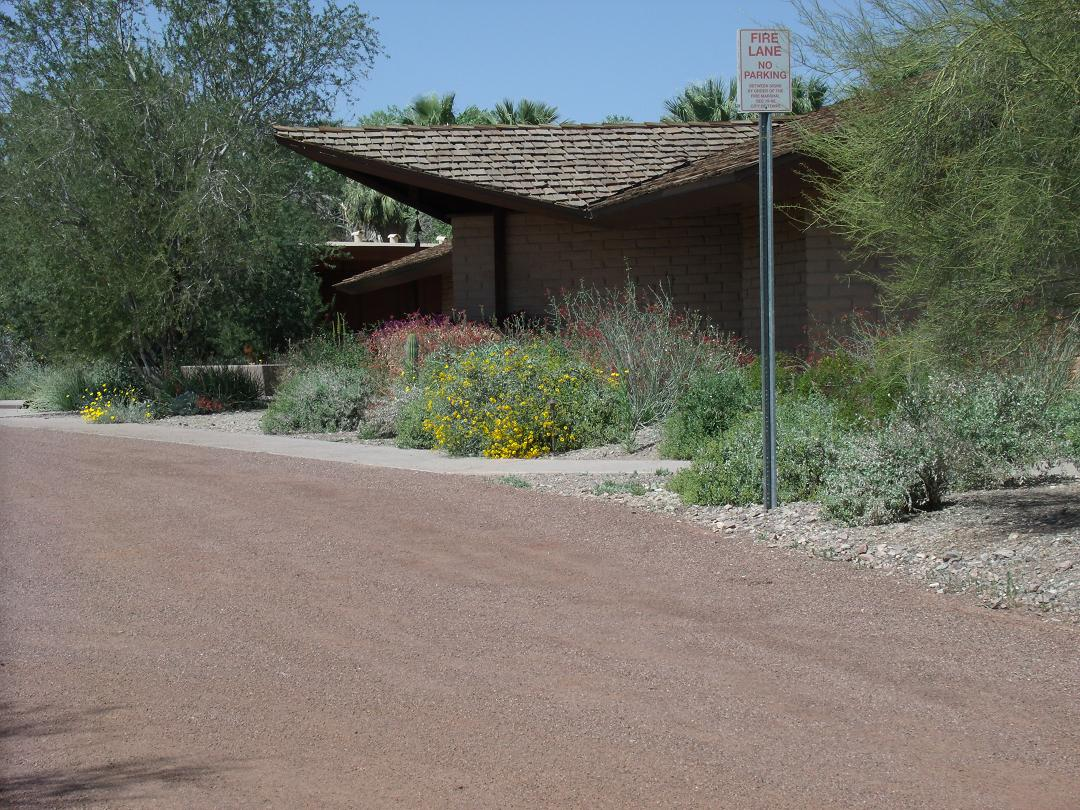
O'Connor's house was moved from Paradise Valley, Ariz., to Tempe's Papago Park.

- In 2009, Justice O'Connor's house was relocated from its original site on Denton Lane in Paradise Valley to 1230 North College Avenue in Tempe Papago Park. The Wright and Ranch architectural style house was built in 1959. It is considered eligible for landmark designation and listing in the Tempe Historic Property Register by the Historic Preservation Office.
- In 2019, Justice O'Connor's house was added to the National Register of Historic Places.

== Hall of fame inductions ==
- In 1995, O'Connor was inducted into the National Women's Hall of Fame.
- In 2001, she was inducted into the Hall of Great Westerners of the National Cowboy & Western Heritage Museum.
- In 2002, O'Connor was inducted into the National Cowgirl Hall of Fame in Fort Worth.
- In 2008, she was inducted into the Texas Women's Hall of Fame in Denton, Texas.
- On March 21, 2014, she was inducted into San Mateo County Women's Hall of Fame.

== Honorary degrees ==
- On May 22, 2006, Yale University awarded O'Connor an honorary doctoral degree at its 305th commencement.
- On September 19, 2006, she delivered the Dedication Address for the Elon University School of Law in Greensboro, North Carolina, and accepted an Honorary Doctor of Laws degree. Earlier that day, she delivered the Fall Convocation Address at Elon University, where she accepted a Doctor of Laws degree.
- In 2007 she became a fellow of the American Academy of Arts and Sciences.
- On April 9, 2013, she was made an Honorary Reagan Fellow and given an honorary doctorate by Eureka College, alma mater of Ronald Reagan, the president who nominated her to the Supreme Court.
- On March 24, 2014, she was given a Doctor of Humane Letters by The Richard Stockton College of New Jersey.

== Other awards and honors ==
- In 1985, she received the Elizabeth Blackwell Award, an award presented periodically to a woman who has demonstrated "outstanding service to humankind", from Hobart and William Smith Colleges.
- In 1987, O'Connor received the Golden Plate Award of the American Academy of Achievement.
- In 1998, O'Connor was awarded the Mary Harriman Community Leadership award by The Association of Junior Leagues International, Inc. for her work supporting bilingual education, repealing "women's work" laws that prohibited the number of hours women could work and reforming Arizona's marital laws to make marriage more equitable for women. O'Connor was a member of the Junior League of Phoenix and served as the League's president from 1966 to 1967.
- On July 4, 2003, the National Constitution Center in Philadelphia awarded O'Connor the Liberty Medal. In her acceptance speech she stated, "one of our greatest judges, Learned Hand, explained:

'Liberty lies in the hearts of men and women. When it dies there, no constitution, no law, no court can save it.' But our understanding today must go beyond the recognition that ‘liberty lies in (our) hearts’ to the further recognition that only citizens with knowledge about the content and meaning of our constitutional guarantees of liberty are likely to cherish those concepts."

- In 2005, for her commitment to the ideals of "Duty, Honor, Country", she was awarded the Sylvanus Thayer Award by the United States Military Academy, becoming only the third woman to receive the award.
- In 2007, O'Connor was named a Gold Medal Honoree by the National Institute of Social Sciences.
- In 2008, O'Connor was made an honorary member of Phi Beta Kappa at the College of William & Mary.
- On March 26, 2008, O'Connor was given the Harry F. Byrd Jr. '35 Public Service Award from the Virginia Military Institute.
- On September 22, 2008, she received the 2008 Franklin Award for commitment to public service and strengthening civic participation from the National Conference on Citizenship.
- On April 9, 2009, Justice O'Connor was named Fifteenth Hendrick Fellow by the United States Coast Guard Academy.
- On August 12, 2009, Justice O'Connor was awarded the U.S. Presidential Medal of Freedom by President Barack Obama.
- On November 18, 2009, O'Connor received The Lincoln Forum's Richard Nelson Current Award of Achievement.
- In October 2011, Justice Day O'Connor received the Brigham–Kanner Property Rights Prize during the Eighth Annual Brigham–Kanner Property Rights Conference, held at Tsingua University, Beijing, China
- In 2013, a painting featuring O'Connor, Sonia Sotomayor, Ruth Bader Ginsburg, and Elena Kagan was unveiled at the Smithsonian's National Portrait Gallery in Washington, D.C. According to the Smithsonian at the time, the painting was on loan to the museum for three years.
- Arizona governor Doug Ducey issued a proclamation making September 25, 2018, Sandra Day O’Connor Day.
- In 2019, Time created 89 new covers to celebrate women of the year starting from 1920; it chose O’Connor for 2000.
