= Sandra Day O'Connor High School =

Sandra Day O'Connor High School may refer to:

- Sandra Day O'Connor High School (Arizona), located in Phoenix, Arizona
- Sandra Day O'Connor High School (Texas), located in Helotes, Texas
