= Sandra Day O'Connor Institute =

American non-profit organization

Sandra Day O'Connor Institute For American Democracy
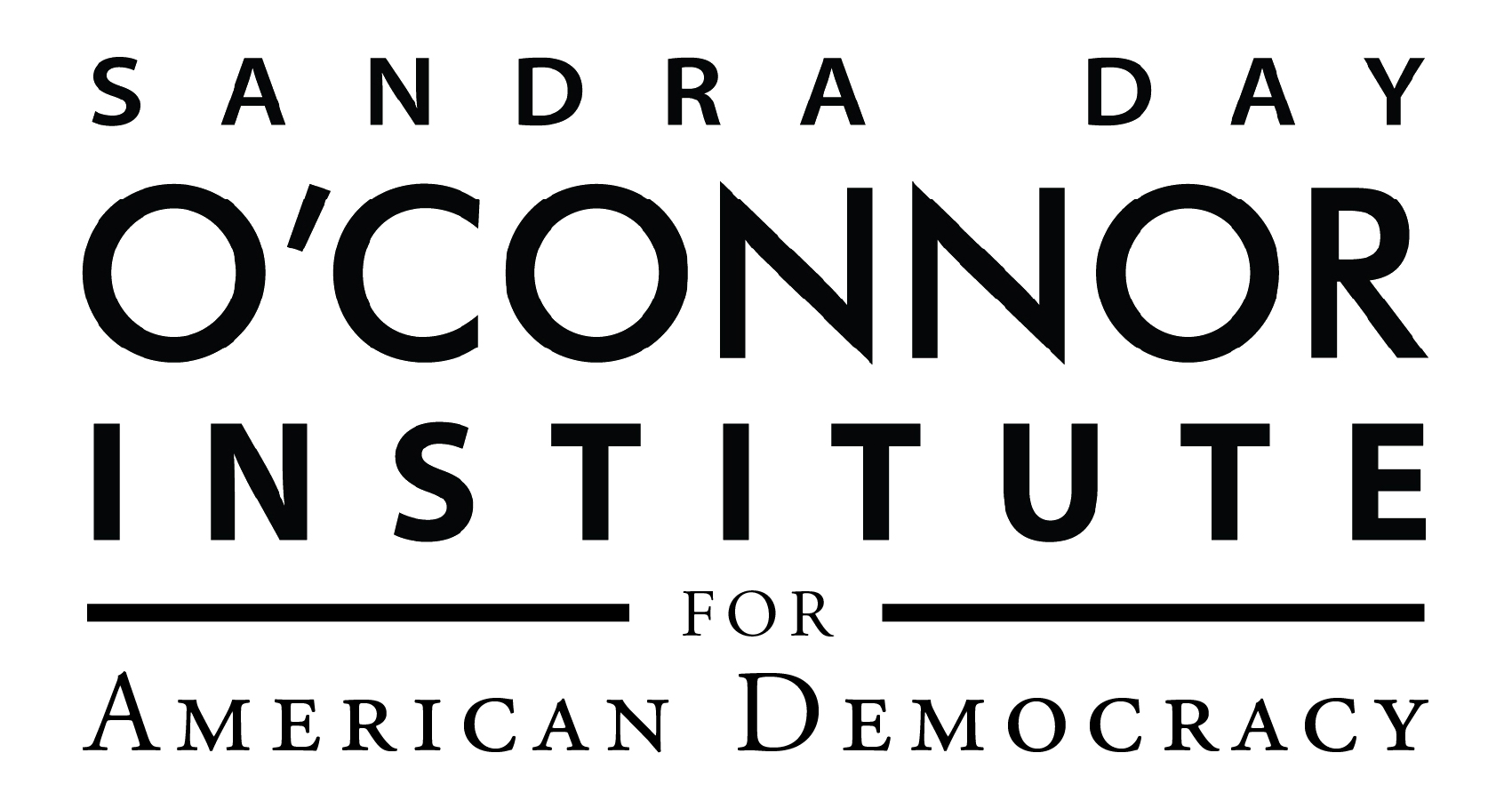
- Formation: 2009
- Location: Phoenix, Arizona, U.S.
- President and CEO: Sarah Suggs
- Website: www.oconnorinstitute.org

The Sandra Day O'Connor Institute For American Democracy is a non-profit organization founded in 2009 by U.S. Supreme Court Justice Sandra Day O'Connor following her retirement from the Court. Headquartered in Phoenix, Arizona, United States, its mission is to "continue Justice Sandra Day O’Connor’s legacy and lifetime work to advance American Democracy through civics education, civic engagement and civil discourse". Leaders and luminaries who have spoken at the O'Connor Institute include General Colin Powell, President George W. Bush and the former Soviet Union President Mikhail Gorbachev. The Institute has featured many notable historians, authors and speakers including David McCullough, Condoleezza Rice, F.W. deKlerk, Jennie and Randolph Churchill, Walter Isaacson, Ron Chernow and Doris Kearns Goodwin.

In March 2023, the organization launched Civics for Life, a free, online, adult civics education platform that supports anyone who wants to learn more about civics, develop their understanding and capacity for civil discourse, and make a difference for themselves and their communities.

== History ==
The Institute, a non-profit, nonpartisan organization, was originally founded as an effort to save and preserve the historic adobe home of Sandra Day O'Connor which was slated for demolition. The house, built in 1959 in Paradise Valley, Arizona, was painstakingly dismantled brick by brick and successfully reassembled in a new location in Tempe's Papago Park near the Arizona Historical Society in 2009 and named O'Connor House thereafter. The O'Connor Institute For American Democracy conserves the house. In 2019, it was listed on the National Register of Historic Places as the Sandra Day O'Connor House. In 2015, Justice O'Connor and the organization's Board of Directors authorized the renaming from O'Connor House to the Sandra Day O'Connor Institute to better represent the broader spectrum of programs and emphasis on civil discourse, civic engagement and civics education . In 2015, inspired by the wishes and directive of Justice Sandra Day O’Connor, the Sandra Day O’Connor Institute For American Democracy was amended to reflect the organization's commitment to advance and preserve American Democracy through civil discourse, civic engagement and civics education providing a spectrum of programs for multi-generational impact. The Institute's programs serve individuals of all ages from 50 states and six continents through its digital education platform. Civics for Life addresses the knowledge gap of countless Americans who did not receive or received very little civics education during their school years.

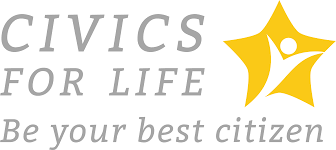
Civics for Life

== Programs and Initiatives ==
=== Civics for Life ===
Civics for Life is a free, online resource for civics education, civil discourse, and civic engagement. It provides multigenerational resources across the country through:

- Robust and user-friendly civics educational materials.
- An ever-expanding library of online conversations and debates with policymakers, authors, and thought leaders showcasing the rich variety of ideas, questions, and concerns that are important to citizens.
- Input Circle and Public Square online communities demonstrate civil and productive discourse and engagement.
- Audio, video, and written resources advance civics education and civil discourse.
- Topical “dueling op-ed” written contributions elevate the best and most sophisticated arguments on both sides of a newsworthy civics-related issue.
- Online publication, Civics for Life Quarterly, focuses on content that connects civics to our daily lives.

=== Original Research ===
The Institute produces original research in civics. Its premier policy brief reshaped the national civics-education paradigm and was covered extensively in the media, including by Education Week, the Chicago Tribune, the Indianapolis Star, KJZZ (NPR), and Arizona Horizon among others. The brief found new and significant evidence that not only does political influence trickle down from parents to children, but it can also trickle up from children to their parents.

=== Issues and Answers Forums ===
The institute hosts debates about various policies featuring speakers from all sides of each issue. Past topics have included independent expenditures, anonymous campaign finance contributions, so-called "dark money", legalization of recreational marijuana, water and drought in the American Southwest, and ranked choice voting and open primaries.

=== Civics for Life Conversation Series ===
The institute hosts conversations with authors about their new books. Past topics have included the intersection of art and civil society (with Jed Perl), gerrymandering (with Nick Seabrook), and what the ancient Greeks and Romans can tell us about choosing good leaders (with Massimo Pigliucci).

=== Camp O'Connor ===
Conceived in 2014 by Justice O'Connor, the goal of Camp O'Connor is to "educate, inspire and encourage the next generation of citizens…to develop a deeper understanding of our democracy". The O'Connor Institute delivers this five-day "democracy boot camp" for middle school students each summer in Phoenix. Due to the COVID-19 pandemic, Camp O'Connor 2020 was postponed to 2021.

=== O'Connor Institute Ambassadors Civics & Debate Club ===
The O’Connor Institute Ambassadors Civics & Debate Club is a free, online program for 9th- through 12th-grade students. O’Connor Institute Ambassadors promote the O’Connor Institute’s three pillars: civil discourse, civics education, and civic engagement. Ambassadors allows students to demonstrate to colleges their commitment to self-improvement, extracurricular learning, and civic-mindedness. Seniors can compete for a $5,000 college scholarship and earn an Ambassador high-school graduation cord.

=== Annual History Dinner ===
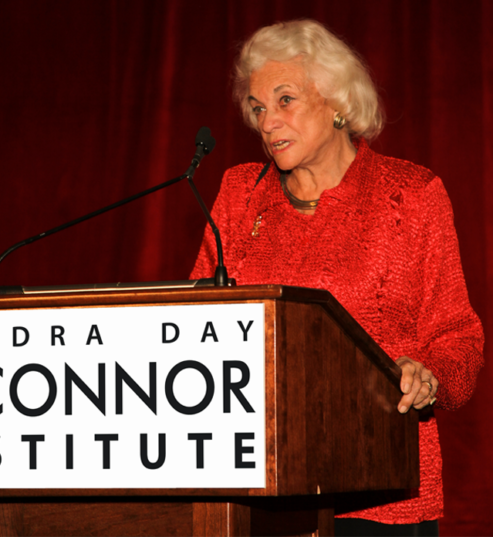
Justice Sandra Day O'Connor

The O'Connor Institute Annual History Dinner presents educational dinners highlighting historic figures, with a notable speaker. Past dinners have showcased Abraham Lincoln (with the Pulitzer Prize winner Doris Kearns Goodwin), Thomas Jefferson (with the Pulitzer Prize winner Jon Meacham), John F. Kennedy (with Ambassador Caroline Kennedy), and Benjamin Franklin (with Walter Isaacson). The 2023 History Dinner will showcase Frederick Douglass (with the Pulitzer Prize winner David Blight).

=== Constitution Series: Equality And Justice For All ===
Free, online forums brought nationally renowned scholars and historians to discuss issues of constitutional rights, racial equality and related topics, while providing an interactive forum for civil dialogue, including audience Q&A. Thousands of viewers from across the country and around the world have logged on to participate in the Constitution Series.

=== O'Connor Civics Challenge ===
In 2020, the O'Connor Institute launched the O'Connor Civics Challenge, a national competition for 6th - 9th grade students. For the Challenge, "Students will...choose one civics topic from a list of options, receive instructions, and then produce a creative video on that topic, three minutes or less in length. Winners will be awarded Apple products." The Civics Challenge launched together with the institute's online education initiative known as O'Connor U.

=== Sandra Day O'Connor Digital Library and Resource Center ===
The Sandra Day O’Connor Digital Library "showcases Justice O’Connor’s historic accomplishments across her decades of work in public service" and "catalogs the life and work of Justice Sandra Day O’Connor, the first woman to serve on the United States Supreme Court." According to the institute, the launch of the Digital Library has meant that, "For the first time, Justice O’Connor’s body of work across her decades in public service is available in an easily accessible, searchable format." The Library is the "world's most comprehensive online collection of Justice Sandra Day O'Connor's life and work.

=== Distinguished Speakers Series ===
The O'Connor Institute Distinguished Speakers Series featured prominent individuals who have fostered civil discourse in their careers. Past speakers have included the former U.S. Secretary of State Condoleezza Rice, the former President of South Africa and Nobel Peace Prize recipient F.W. de Klerk, the former Finnish Minister of Defense Elisabeth Rehn, the Pulitzer Prize winner David McCullough, the Human Rights Foundation chairman and past world chess champion Garry Kasparov, the retired Admiral and NATO Supreme Allied Commander Europe James Stavridis, the former CIA Director James Woolsey and First Lady Laura Bush.
