= Sandra Day O'Connor House =

Historic house in Arizona, United States

- U.S. National Register of Historic Places
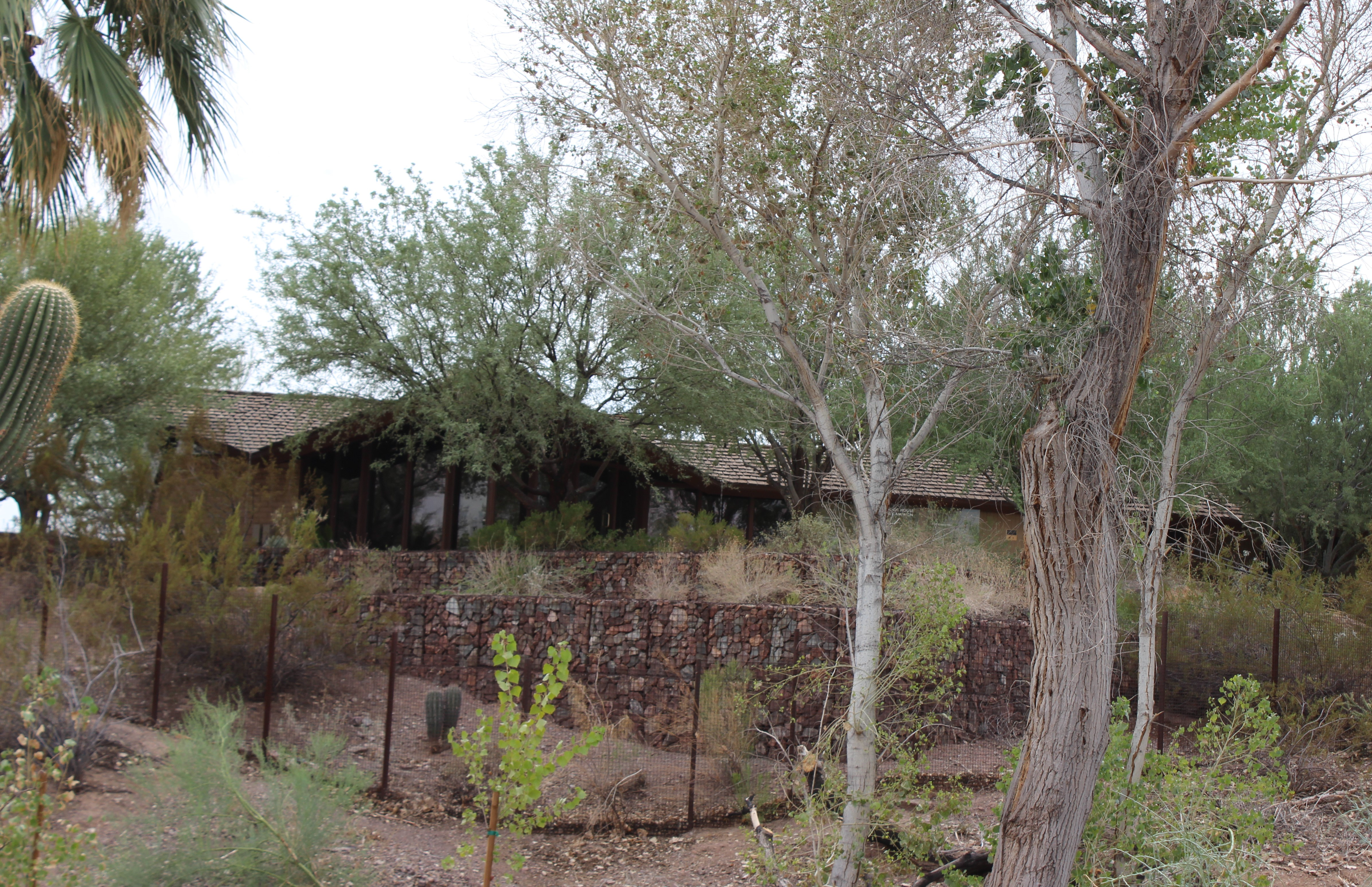

- Location within Arizona Location within the United States
- Location: 1230 North College Avenue, Tempe, Arizona
- Coordinates: 33.4419°N 111.9333°W
- Built: 1957
- Architect: D.K. Taylor
- Restored: 2000
- Restored by: Sandra Day O'Connor Institute
- NRHP reference No.: 100004185
- Added to NRHP: July 20, 2019

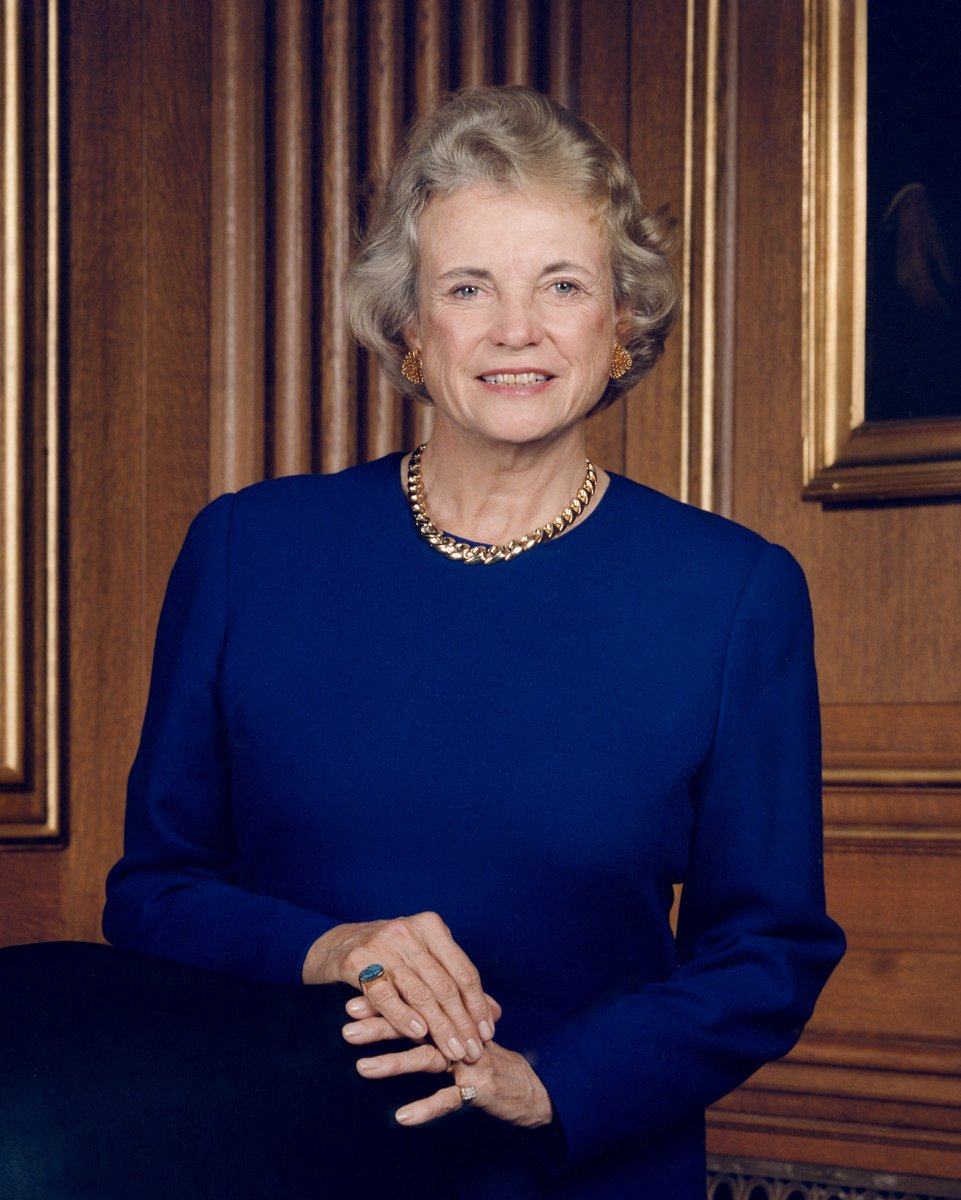
Sandra Day O'Connor

The Sandra Day O'Connor House is the historic home of former U.S. Supreme Court Justice from Arizona, Sandra Day O'Connor. Originally built in Paradise Valley, Arizona, it was disassembled and moved to Tempe over two years beginning in 2007 to become the home of the Sandra Day O'Connor Institute and was added to the National Register of Historic Places in 2019.

== Description ==
The home was built in 1957 of adobe brick made from mud collected at the nearby Salt River. It is one-story with three bedrooms, floor-to-ceiling windows and is approximately 1,700 sq ft (160 m^{2}). The design is mid-century modern with significant influences of Frank Lloyd Wright. O'Connor and her husband placed some of the brick during the construction, and applied skim milk as a preservative. The original location was on Denton Lane in the town of Paradise Valley, a suburb of Phoenix.

In addition to Wright influences such as the large floor-to-ceiling windows that connect the inside to the outside environment, large overhangs to block the desert sun, and a modern "minimal palette of materials", the long narrow shape reflects the California ranch popularized by Cliff May. The house also features exposed adobe brick on the interior, red concrete floors and exposed wood structural beams. It was O'Connor's desire that the design of the house evoke memories of her childhood home, an adobe ranch house in Duncan, Arizona.

A post-O'Connor owner of the property planned to demolish the home in order to build a larger residence on the lot. A preservation effort ensued which raised $2 million in private funding and the house was disassembled beginning in 2007. Each adobe brick was removed, individually numbered, and stacked for transport to the new location. Other parts were moved in large assemblies. In May 2008, land in Tempe's Papago Park was allocated by unanimous vote of the Tempe City Council. Reconstruction was completed in 2009. The house was rebuilt in its original geographic orientation.

The new location is within the Carl Hayden Campus for Sustainability at the park, is adjacent to the Arizona Historical Society Museum, and overlooks the city of Tempe and the Salt River. The site was designed by landscape architect Christy Ten Eyck.

== Residence ==
O'Connor made her residence in the house from 1958 to 1981, when she was appointed to the Supreme Court by President Ronald Reagan. O'Connor frequently entertained political figures at the house, including U.S. Senator and Republican presidential nominee Barry Goldwater and former Democratic governor Bruce Babbitt. "Anyone who was anyone in Arizona politics in the 1960s, 1970s was in that house having dinner with Justice O'Connor," according to Arizona State Preservation officer Kathryn Leonard.

O'Connor loved to cook and liked preparing Mexican food including chalupas. The O'Connor's served guests on the large patio. According to Leonard, "This is where she had these very productive policy conversations. When people were breaking bread with each other ... and getting to know each other as individuals, she believed there was almost no problem that couldn't be solved over one civil dinner."

== Nomination ==
The Sandra Day O'Connor Institute and the Arizona State Historic Preservation Office had been working to have the home listed for about ten years. Much of the delay was due to the fact that the home had been moved from its original location. The National Park Service normally does not consider properties that have been moved, nor those associated with a living person. Supporters countered that the move and renovation was done with the "input" of O'Connor and allowed the building to be used for "civic education". The institute uses the building for "workshops, meetings and special events."

Arizona State Preservation officer Kathryn Leonard said "In the case of Justice O'Connor, she is iconic and quite obviously a living legend. I think that was a very clear sell to the National Register folks."

The board chairman of the O'Connor Institute, Matt Feeney said "Her storied life is symbolized by this iconic structure that embodies her character and quest for civil discourse."

The nomination also had the support of Arizona's senators Martha McSally and Kyrsten Sinema. McSally hoped that listing the house would "preserve her legacy for generations to come."

Although moved from its original location, the house was still eligible for listing as "the singular surviving property most importantly associated with an historic person". O'Connor is one of Arizona's "most recognizable and influential public figures". She served as Arizona's attorney general for four years until being appointed to the Arizona Senate in 1969 where she won reelection twice. She became the Senate majority leader in 1972, and was the first woman in that position in any state. After the senate, she was a Maricopa County Superior Court judge and then served on the Arizona Court of Appeals. Becoming the first woman on the Supreme Court elevated her stature in Arizona and gave her national recognition. She was awarded the nation's highest civilian honor, the Presidential Medal of Freedom, in 2009.
