= Sandra Day O'Connor =

American lawyer, politician and judge (1930–2023)

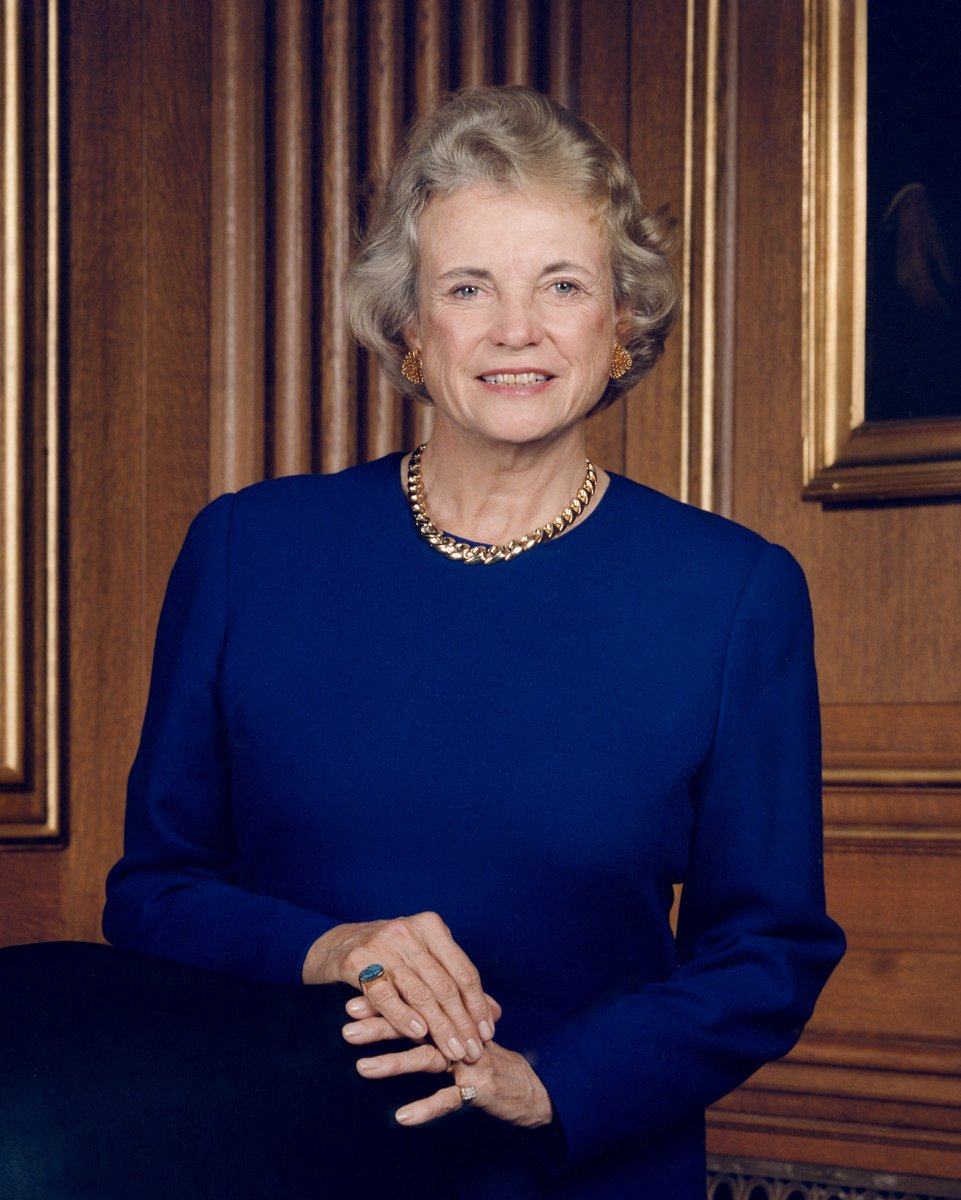
- Official portrait, c. 2002

Associate Justice of the Supreme Court of the United States
- In office September 25, 1981 – January 31, 2006
- Nominated by: Ronald Reagan
- Preceded by: Potter Stewart
- Succeeded by: Samuel Alito

Judge of the Arizona Court of Appeals for Division One
- In office December 14, 1979 – September 25, 1981
- Nominated by: Bruce Babbitt
- Preceded by: Mary Schroeder
- Succeeded by: Sarah D. Grant

Judge of the Maricopa County Superior Court for Division 31
- In office January 9, 1975 – December 14, 1979
- Preceded by: David Perry
- Succeeded by: Cecil Patterson

Member of the Arizona Senate
- In office October 30, 1969 – January 13, 1975
- Preceded by: Isabel Burgess
- Succeeded by: John Pritzlaff
- Constituency: 8-E district (1969–1971); 20th district (1971–1973); 24th district (1973–1975)

23rd Chancellor of the College of William and Mary
- In office October 1, 2005 – February 3, 2012
- President: Gene Nichol; Taylor Reveley
- Preceded by: Henry Kissinger
- Succeeded by: Robert Gates

Personal details
- Born: Sandra Day; March 26, 1930 El Paso, Texas, U.S.
- Died: December 1, 2023 (aged 93) Phoenix, Arizona, U.S.
- Party: Republican
- Spouse: John Jay O'Connor (m. 1952; died 2009)
- Children: 3
- Relatives: Ann Day (sister)
- Education: Stanford University (BA, LLB)
- Known for: First female U.S. Supreme Court justice
- Awards: Presidential Medal of Freedom (2009)
- Sandra Day O'Connor's voice Sandra Day O'Connor delivers the opinion of the Court in Wiggins v. Smith; Recorded June 26, 2003

Sandra Day O'Connor (March 26, 1930 – December 1, 2023) was an American attorney, politician, and jurist who served as an associate justice of the Supreme Court of the United States from 1981 to 2006. Nominated by President Ronald Reagan, O'Connor was the first woman to serve as a U.S. Supreme Court justice. A moderate conservative, she was considered a swing vote. Before O'Connor's tenure on the Court, she was an Arizona state judge and earlier an elected legislator in Arizona, serving as the first female majority leader of a state senate as the Republican leader in the Arizona Senate. Upon her nomination to the Court, O'Connor was confirmed unanimously by the United States Senate.

O'Connor usually sided with the Court's conservative bloc but on occasion sided with the Court's liberal members. She often wrote concurring opinions that sought to limit the reach of the majority holding. Her majority opinions in landmark cases include Grutter v. Bollinger and Hamdi v. Rumsfeld. In 2000, she wrote in part the per curiam majority opinion in Bush v. Gore and in 1992 was one of three co-authors of the lead opinion in Planned Parenthood v. Casey that preserved legal access to abortion in the United States. On July 1, 2005, O'Connor announced her retirement, effective upon the confirmation of a successor. At the time of her death, O'Connor was the last living member of the Burger Court. Samuel Alito was nominated to take her seat in October 2005, and joined the Supreme Court on January 31, 2006.

During her term on the Court, O'Connor was regarded as among the most powerful women in the world. After retiring, she succeeded Henry Kissinger as the chancellor of the College of William & Mary. In 2009, she was awarded the Presidential Medal of Freedom by President Barack Obama.

== Early life and education ==
External videos
- Booknotes interview with O'Connor on Lazy B: Growing Up on a Cattle Ranch in the American Southwest, January 27, 2002, C-SPAN

Sandra Day was born on March 26, 1930, in El Paso, Texas, the daughter of Harry Alfred Day, a rancher, and Ada Mae (Wilkey). She grew up on a 198,000-acre family cattle ranch near Duncan, Arizona and in El Paso, where she attended school. Her home was nine miles from the nearest paved road. It lacked running water or electricity until Sandra was seven years old. As a cowgirl she owned a .22-caliber rifle and would shoot coyotes and jackrabbits. She began driving as soon as she could see over the dashboard and had to learn to change flat tires herself. Sandra had two younger siblings, a sister and a brother, respectively eight and ten years her junior. Her sister Ann Day was a member of the Arizona Legislature from 1990 to 2000. Her brother was H. Alan Day, a lifelong rancher, with whom she wrote Lazy B: Growing up on a Cattle Ranch in the American Southwest (2002), about their childhood experiences on the ranch. For most of her early schooling, Day lived in El Paso with her maternal grandmother. She went to the Radford School for Girls, a private school, because the family ranch was far from schools. Day was able to return to the ranch for holidays and the summer. Day did spend her eighth-grade year living at the ranch and riding a bus 32 miles to school. She graduated sixth in her class at Austin High School in El Paso in 1946.

Accepted into Stanford University at age 16, O'Connor earned a B.A. in economics in 1950, graduating magna cum laude. Inspired by Professor Harry Rathbun, she pursued a law degree at Stanford Law School, graduating near the top of her class in 1952. While attending, she served on the Stanford Law Review whose then presiding editor-in-chief was future Supreme Court chief justice William Rehnquist. Day achieved the Order of the Coif, indicating she was in the top 10 percent of her class.

== Early career and marriage ==
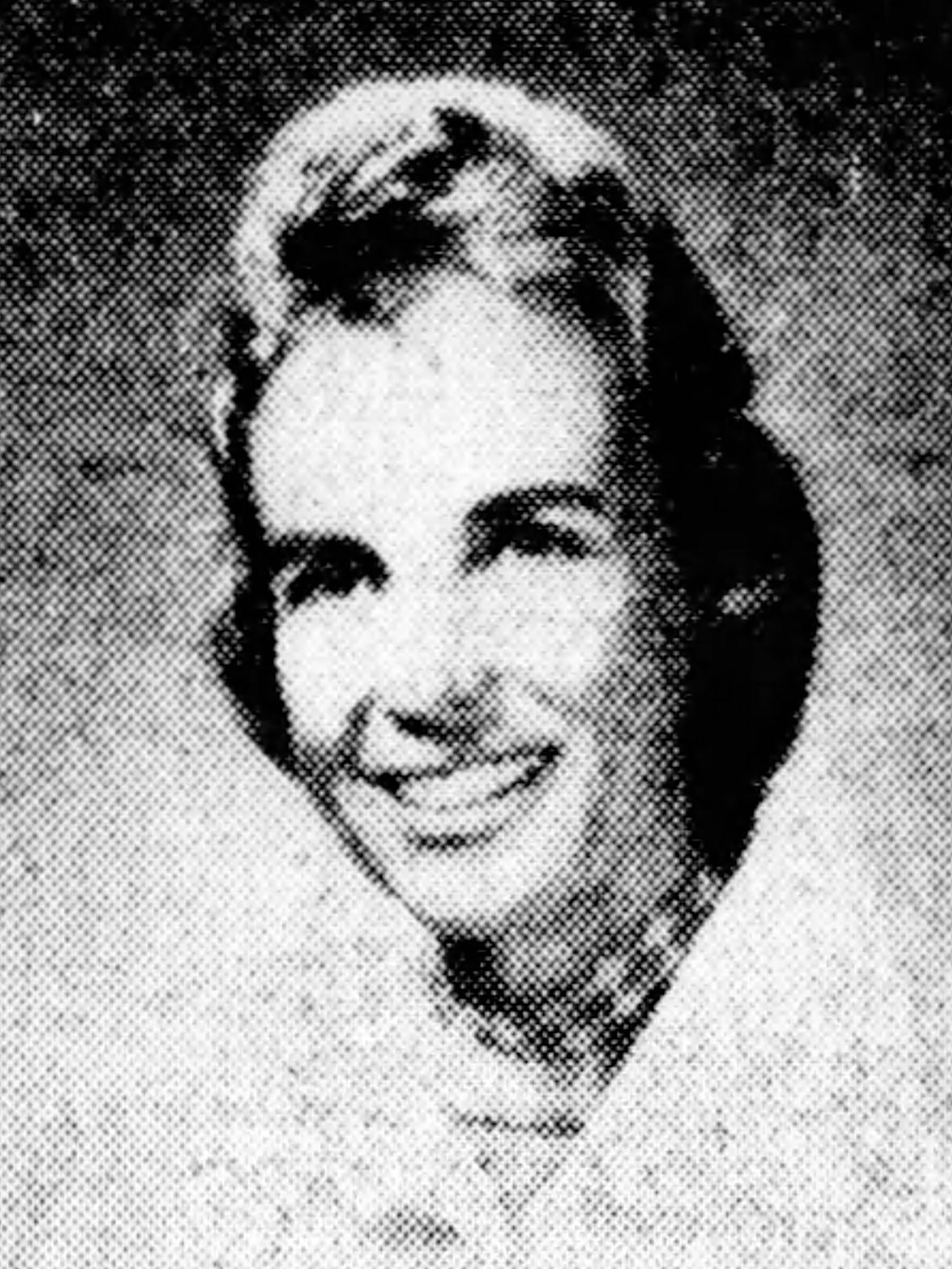
O'Connor in 1974

While in her final year at Stanford Law School, Day began dating John Jay O'Connor III, who was one class year behind her. On December 20, 1952, six months after her graduation, O'Connor and Day married at her family's ranch.

Upon graduation from law school in 1952, O'Connor had difficulty finding a paying job as an attorney in a law firm because of her gender. O'Connor found employment as a deputy county attorney in San Mateo, California, after she offered to work for no salary and without an office, sharing space with a secretary. After a few months, she began drawing a small salary as she performed legal research and wrote memos. She worked with San Mateo County District Attorney Louis Dematteis and deputy district attorney Keith Sorensen.

When her husband was drafted, O'Connor decided to go with him to work in Germany as a civilian attorney for the Army's Quartermaster Corps. They remained there for three years before returning to the States where they settled in Maricopa County, Arizona, and she started a law firm. They had three sons: Scott (born 1958), Brian (born 1960), and Jay (born 1962). Following Brian's birth, O'Connor took a five-year hiatus from the practice of law.

She volunteered in various political organizations, such as the Maricopa County Young Republicans, and served on Arizona Senator Barry Goldwater's presidential campaign in 1964.

O'Connor served as assistant Attorney General of Arizona from 1965 to 1969. In 1969, the governor of Arizona appointed O'Connor to fill a vacancy in the Arizona Senate. She ran for and won the election for the seat the following year. By 1973, she became the first woman to serve as Arizona's or any state's majority leader. She developed a reputation as a skilled negotiator and a moderate. After serving two full terms, O'Connor decided to leave the Senate.

In 1974, O'Connor was appointed to the Maricopa County Superior Court, serving from 1975 to 1979 when she was elevated to the Arizona Court of Appeals.

In late 1977 and early 1978, she presided over an aggravated assault case against Clarence Dixon, a 22-year-old Arizona State University student who had attacked a 15-year-old girl with a metal pipe. O'Connor would find Dixon not guilty by reason of insanity and have him remanded to a state hospital. In the four-day period between O'Connor's ruling and Dixon's remanding to hospital, Dixon would rape and murder one of his seniors, 21-year-old Deana Lynne Bowdoin; he would not be arrested until 2001 when DNA evidence identified him, and he was executed for Bowdoin's murder in 2022.

She served on the Court of Appeals-Division One until 1981 when she was appointed to the Supreme Court by President Ronald Reagan.

== Supreme Court career ==
=== Nomination and confirmation ===
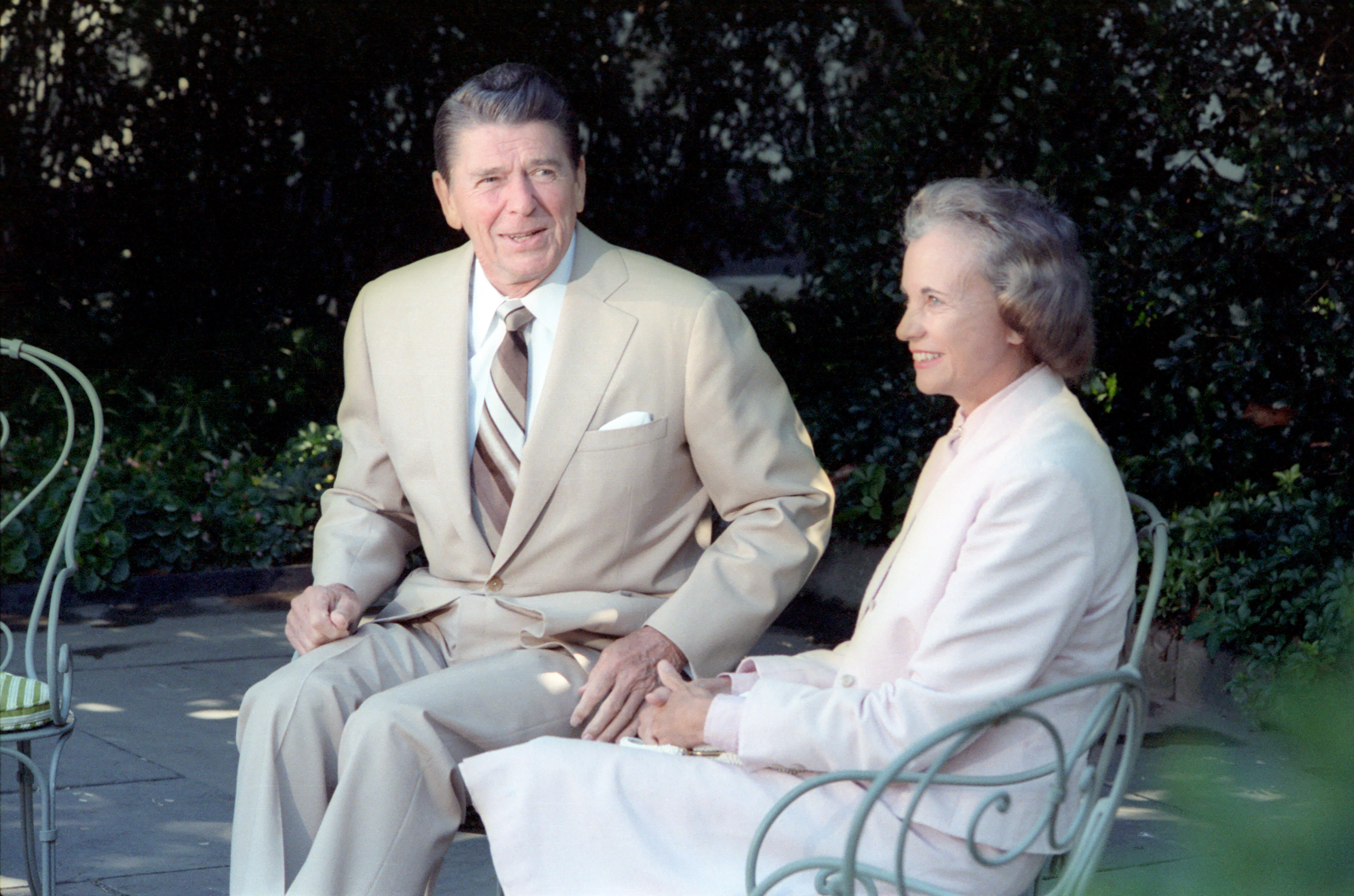
Supreme Court justice-nominee Sandra Day O'Connor talks with President Ronald Reagan outside the White House, July 15, 1981.

On July 7, 1981, Reagan – who had pledged during his 1980 presidential campaign to appoint the first woman to the Court – announced he would nominate O'Connor as an associate justice of the Supreme Court to replace the retiring Potter Stewart. O'Connor received notification from President Reagan of her nomination on the day prior to the announcement and did not know that she was a finalist for the position.

Reagan wrote in his diary on July 6, 1981: "Called Judge O'Connor and told her she was my nominee for supreme court. Already the flak is starting and from my own supporters. Right to Life people say she is pro abortion. She declares abortion is personally repugnant to her. I think she'll make a good justice." O'Connor told Reagan she did not remember whether she had supported repealing Arizona's law banning abortion. However, she had cast a preliminary vote in the Arizona State Senate in 1970 in favor of a bill to repeal the state's criminal-abortion statute. In 1974, O'Connor had opined against a measure to prohibit abortions in some Arizona hospitals. Anti-abortion and religious groups opposed O'Connor's nomination because they suspected, correctly, she would not be willing to overturn Roe v. Wade. U.S. Senate Republicans, including Don Nickles of Oklahoma, Steve Symms of Idaho, and Jesse Helms of North Carolina called the White House to express their discontent over the nomination; Nickles said he and "other profamily Republican senators would not support O'Connor". Helms, Nickles, and Symms nevertheless reluctantly voted for confirmation.

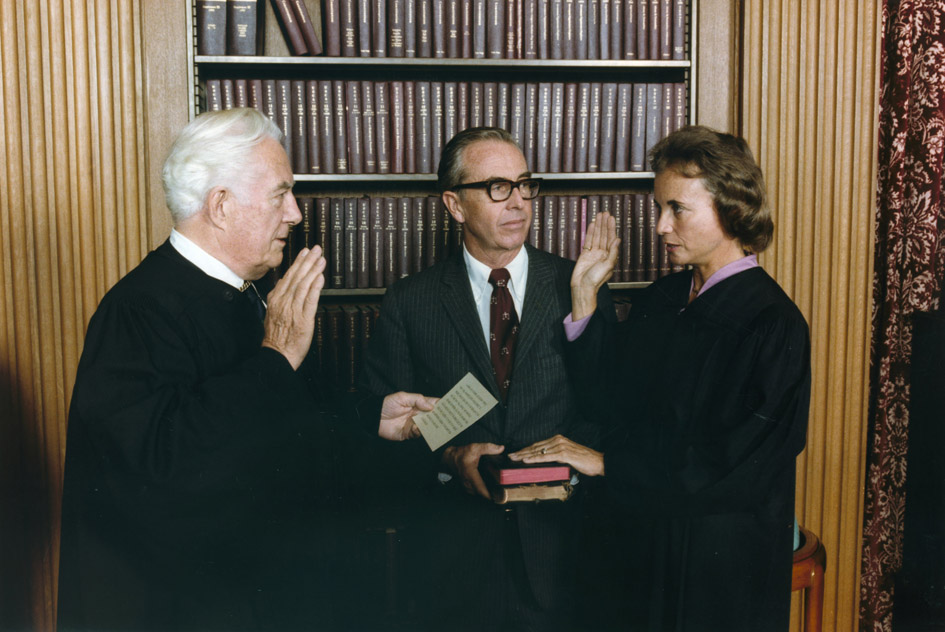
O'Connor is sworn in by Chief Justice Warren Burger as her husband John O'Connor looks on.

Reagan formally nominated O'Connor on August 19, 1981. Conservative activists such as the Reverend Jerry Falwell, Howard Phillips, and Peter Gemma also spoke out against the nomination. Gemma called the nomination "a direct contradiction of the Republican platform to everything that candidate Reagan said and even President Reagan has said in regard to social issues." Gemma, the executive director of the National Pro-Life Political Action Committee, had sought to delay O'Connor's confirmation by challenging her record, including support for the Equal Rights Amendment.

O'Connor's confirmation hearing before the Senate Judiciary Committee began on September 9, 1981. It was the first televised confirmation hearing for a Supreme Court justice. The confirmation hearing lasted three days and largely focused on the issue of abortion. When asked, O'Connor refused to telegraph her views on abortion, and she was careful not to leave the impression that she supported abortion rights. The Judiciary Committee approved O'Connor with seventeen votes in favor and one vote of present.

On September 21, O'Connor was confirmed by the U.S. Senate with a vote of 99–0. Only Senator Max Baucus of Montana was absent from the vote. He sent O'Connor a copy of A River Runs Through It by way of apology. In her first year on the Court, she received over 60,000 letters from the public, more than any other justice in history.

=== Tenure ===
O'Connor said she felt a responsibility to demonstrate women could do the job of justice. She faced some practical concerns, including the lack of a women's restroom near the Courtroom.

Two years after O'Connor joined the Court, The New York Times published an editorial that mentioned the "nine men" of the "SCOTUS", or Supreme Court of the United States. O'Connor responded with a letter to the editor reminding the Times that the Court was no longer composed of nine men and referred to herself as FWOTSC (First Woman on the Supreme Court). On January 20, 1989, at the Inauguration of George H. W. Bush, O'Connor became the first female justice of the Supreme Court to administer the oath for a Vice President of the United States (Dan Quayle).

O'Connor was a proponent of collegiality among justices on the court, often insisting that the justices eat lunch together.

In 1993, Ruth Bader Ginsburg became the second female Supreme Court justice. O'Connor said that she felt relief from the media clamor when she no longer was the only woman on the Court. In May 2010, O'Connor warned female Supreme Court nominee Elena Kagan about the "unpleasant" process of confirmation hearings.

=== Supreme Court jurisprudence ===
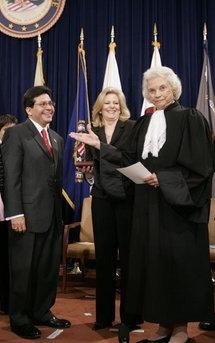
Justice O'Connor presents Alberto Gonzales to the audience after swearing him in as U.S. Attorney General, as Becky Gonzales looks on.

Initially, O'Connor's voting record aligned closely with the conservative William Rehnquist (voting with him 87% of the time during her first three years at the Court). From that time until 1998, O'Connor's alignment with Rehnquist ranged from 93.4% to 63.2%, hitting above 90% in three of those years. In nine of her first 16 years on the Court, O'Connor voted with Rehnquist more than with any other justice.

Later on, as the Court's make-up became more conservative (e.g., Anthony Kennedy replacing Lewis Powell, and Clarence Thomas replacing Thurgood Marshall), O'Connor often became the swing vote on the Court. However, she usually disappointed the Court's more liberal bloc in contentious 5–4 decisions: from 1994 to 2004, she joined the traditional conservative bloc of Rehnquist, Antonin Scalia, Anthony Kennedy, and Thomas 82 times; she joined the liberal bloc of John Paul Stevens, David Souter, Ruth Bader Ginsburg, and Stephen Breyer only 28 times.

O'Connor's relatively small shift away from conservatives on the Court seems to have been due at least in part to Thomas' views. When Thomas and O'Connor were voting on the same side, she would typically write a separate opinion of her own, refusing to join his. In the 1992 term, O'Connor did not join a single one of Thomas's dissents.

Some notable cases in which O'Connor joined the majority in a 5–4 decision were:

- McConnell v. FEC, 540 U.S. 93 (2003), upholding the constitutionality of most of the McCain-Feingold campaign-finance bill regulating "soft money" contributions.
- Grutter v. Bollinger, 539 U.S. 306 (2003) and Gratz v. Bollinger, 539 U.S. 244 (2003), O'Connor wrote the opinion of the Court in Grutter and joined the majority in Gratz. In this pair of cases, the University of Michigan's undergraduate admissions program was held to have engaged in unconstitutional reverse discrimination, but the more limited type of affirmative action in the University of Michigan Law School's admissions program was held to have been constitutional.
- Lockyer v. Andrade, 538 U.S. 63 (2003): O'Connor wrote the majority opinion, with the four conservative justices concurring, that a 50-year to life sentence without parole for petty shoplifting a few children's videotapes under California's three strikes law was not cruel and unusual punishment under the Eighth Amendment because there was no "clearly established" law to that effect. Leandro Andrade, a Latino nine-year Army veteran and father of three, will be eligible for parole in 2046 at age 87.
- Zelman v. Simmons-Harris, 536 U.S. 639 (2002), O'Connor joined the majority holding that the use of school vouchers for religious schools did not violate the First Amendment's Establishment Clause.
- United States v. Lopez, 514 U.S. 549 (1995): O'Connor joined a majority holding unconstitutional the Gun-Free School Zones Act as beyond Congress' Commerce Clause power.
- Bush v. Gore, 531 U.S. 98 (2000), O'Connor joined with four other justices on December 12, 2000, to rule on the Bush v. Gore case that ceased challenges to the results of the 2000 presidential election (ruling to stop the ongoing Florida election recount and to allow no further recounts). This case effectively ended Al Gore's hopes to become president. Some legal scholars have argued that she should have recused herself from this case, citing several reports that she became upset when the media initially announced that Gore had won Florida, with her husband explaining that they would have to wait another four years before retiring to Arizona. O'Connor expressed surprise that the decision became controversial. Some people in Washington stopped shaking her hand after the decision, and Arthur Miller confronted her about it at the Kennedy Center.

O'Connor played an important role in other notable cases, such as:

- Webster v. Reproductive Health Services, 492 U.S. 490 (1989): This decision upheld as constitutional state restrictions on second trimester abortions that are not necessary to protect maternal health, contrary to the original trimester requirements in Roe v. Wade. Although O'Connor joined the majority, which also included Rehnquist, Scalia, Kennedy, and Byron White, in a concurring opinion she refused to explicitly overturn Roe.

On February 22, 2005, with Rehnquist and Stevens (who were senior to her) absent, she became the senior justice presiding over oral arguments in the case of Kelo v. City of New London, becoming the first woman to do so before the Court.

==== First Amendment ====
O'Connor was unpredictable in many of her court decisions, especially those regarding First Amendment Establishment Clause issues. Barry Lynn, executive director of Americans United for Separation of Church and State, said, "O'Connor was a conservative, but she saw the complexity of church-state issues and tried to choose a course that respected the country's religious diversity" (Hudson 2005). O'Connor voted in favor of religious institutions, such as in Rosenberger v. University of Virginia (1995), Mitchell v. Helms (2000), and Zelman v. Simmons-Harris (2002). Conversely, in Lee v. Weisman she was part of the majority in the case that saw religious prayer and pressure to stand in silence at a graduation ceremony as part of a religious act that coerced people to support or participate in religion, which the Establishment Clause strictly prohibits. This is consistent with a similar case, Santa Fe Independent School District v. Doe, involving prayer at a school football game. In this case, O'Connor joined the majority opinion that stated prayer at school football games violates the Establishment Clause. O'Connor was the first justice to articulate the "no endorsement" standard for the Establishment Clause. In Lynch v. Donnelly, O'Connor signed onto a five-justice majority opinion holding that a nativity scene in a public Christmas display did not violate the First Amendment. She penned a concurrence in that case, opining that the crèche did not violate the Establishment Clause because it did not express an endorsement or disapproval of any religion. In Board of County Commissioners, Wabaunsee County, Kansas v Umbehr (1996) she upheld the application of first amendment free speech rights to independent contractors working for public bodies, being unpersuaded "that there is a 'difference of constitutional magnitude' ... between independent contractors and employees" in circumstances where a contractor has been critical of a governing body.

==== Fourth Amendment ====
According to law professor Jeffrey Rosen, "O'Connor was an eloquent opponent of intrusive group searches that threatened privacy without increasing security. In a 1983 opinion upholding searches by drug-sniffing dogs, she recognized that a search is most likely to be considered constitutionally reasonable if it is very effective at discovering contraband without revealing innocent but embarrassing information." Washington College of Law professor Andrew Taslitz, referencing O'Connor's dissent in a 2001 case, said of her Fourth Amendment jurisprudence: "O'Connor recognizes that needless humiliation of an individual is an important factor in determining Fourth Amendment reasonableness." O'Connor once quoted the social contract theory of John Locke as influencing her views on the reasonableness and constitutionality of government action.

==== Cases involving race ====
In McCleskey v. Kemp (1987), O'Connor joined a 5–4 majority that voted to uphold the death penalty for an African American man, Warren McCleskey, convicted of killing a white police officer, despite statistical evidence that Black defendants were more likely to receive the death penalty than others both in Georgia and in the U.S. as a whole.

In the 1990 and 1995 Missouri v. Jenkins rulings, O'Connor voted with the majority that Federal district courts had no authority to require the state of Missouri to increase school funding to counteract racial inequality. In the 1991 case Freeman v. Pitts, O'Connor joined a concurring opinion in a plurality, agreeing that a school district that had formerly been under judicial review for racial segregation could be freed of this review, even though not all desegregation targets had been met. Law professor Herman Schwartz criticized these rulings, writing that in both cases "both the fact and effects of segregation were still present".

In 1996's Shaw v. Hunt and Shaw v. Reno, O'Connor joined a Rehnquist opinion, following an earlier precedent from an opinion she authored in 1993, in which the Court struck down an electoral districting plan designed to facilitate the election of two Black representatives out of 12 from North Carolina, a state that had not had any Black representative since Reconstruction, despite being approximately 20% Black – the Court held that the districts were unacceptably gerrymandered and O'Connor called the odd shape of the district in question, North Carolina's 12th, "bizarre".

Law professor Herman Schwartz called O'Connor "the Court's leader in its assault on racially oriented affirmative action", although she joined with the Court in upholding the constitutionality of limited race-based admissions to universities.

In 2003, O'Connor authored a majority Supreme Court opinion (Grutter v. Bollinger) saying racial affirmative action should not be constitutional permanently, but long enough to correct past discrimination – with an approximate limit of around 25 years.

==== Abortion ====
The Christian right element in the Reagan coalition strongly supported him in 1980, in the belief that he would appoint Supreme Court justices to overturn Roe v. Wade. They were astonished and dismayed when his first appointment was O'Connor, who they feared would tolerate abortion. They worked hard to defeat her confirmation but failed. In her confirmation hearings and early days on the Court, O'Connor was carefully ambiguous on the issue of abortion, as some conservatives questioned her anti-abortion credentials based on some of her votes in the Arizona legislature. O'Connor generally dissented from 1980s opinions which took an expansive view of Roe v. Wade; she criticized that decision's "trimester approach" sharply in her dissent in City of Akron v. Akron Center for Reproductive Health (1983). She criticized Roe in Thornburgh v. American College of Obstetricians and Gynecologists (1986): "I dispute not only the wisdom but also the legitimacy of the Court's attempt to discredit and pre-empt state abortion regulation regardless of the interests it serves and the impact it has." In 1989, O'Connor stated during the deliberations over the Webster case that she would not overrule Roe. While on the Court, O'Connor did not vote to strike down any restrictions on abortion until Hodgson v. Minnesota in 1990.

O'Connor allowed certain limits to be placed on access to abortion, but supported the right to abortion established by Roe. In the landmark ruling Planned Parenthood v. Casey (1992), O'Connor used a test she had originally developed in City of Akron v. Akron Center for Reproductive Health to limit the holding of Roe v. Wade, opening up a legislative portal where a State could enact measures so long as they did not place an "undue burden" on a woman's right to an abortion. Casey revised downward the standard of scrutiny federal courts would apply to state abortion restrictions, a major departure from Roe. However, it preserved Roe's core constitutional precept: that the Fourteenth Amendment implies and protects a woman's fundamental right to control the outcomes of her reproductive actions. Writing the plurality opinion for the Court, O'Connor, along with Kennedy and Souter, famously declared: "At the heart of liberty is the right to define one's own concept of existence, of meaning, of the universe, and of the mystery of human life. Beliefs about these matters could not define the attributes of personhood were they formed under compulsion of the State."

==== Commentary and analysis ====
O'Connor's case-by-case approach routinely placed her in the center of the Court and drew both criticism and praise. Washington Post columnist Charles Krauthammer, for example, described her as lacking a judicial philosophy and instead displaying "political positioning embedded in a social agenda." Conservative commentator Ramesh Ponnuru wrote that, even though O'Connor "has voted reasonably well", her tendency to issue very case-specific rulings "undermines the predictability of the law and aggrandizes the judicial role."

Law clerks serving the Court in 2000 speculated that the decision she reached in Bush v. Gore was based on a desire to appear fair, rather than on any legal rationale, pointing to a memo she sent out the night before the decision was issued that used entirely different logic to reach the same result. They also characterized her approach to cases as deciding on "gut feelings".

=== Other activities while serving on the Court ===
External videos
- Interview with O'Connor on The Majesty of the Law, April 9, 2003, C-SPAN
- Presentation by O'Connor on Chico, September 18, 2005, C-SPAN

In 2003, she wrote a book titled The Majesty of the Law: Reflections of a Supreme Court Justice (ISBN 0-375-50925-9). In 2005, she wrote a children's book, Chico: A True Story from the Childhood of the First Woman Supreme Court Justice, named for her favorite horse, which offered an autobiographical depiction of her childhood.

== Retirement ==
On December 12, 2000, The Wall Street Journal reported that O'Connor was reluctant to retire with a Democrat in the presidency: "At an Election Night party at the Washington, D.C., home of Mary Ann Stoessel, widow of former Ambassador Walter Stoessel, the justice's husband, John O'Connor, mentioned to others her desire to step down, according to three witnesses. But Mr. O'Connor said his wife would be reluctant to retire if a Democrat were in the White House and would choose her replacement. Justice O'Connor declined to comment."

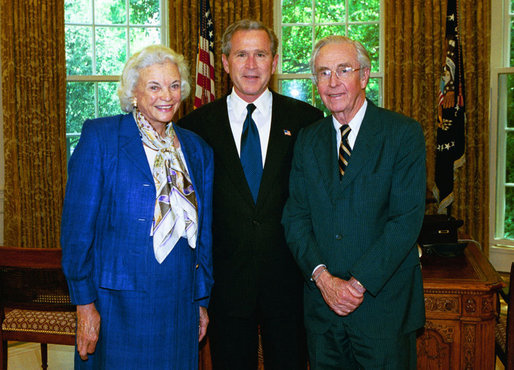
Justice O'Connor and her husband John O'Connor with President George W. Bush in May 2004

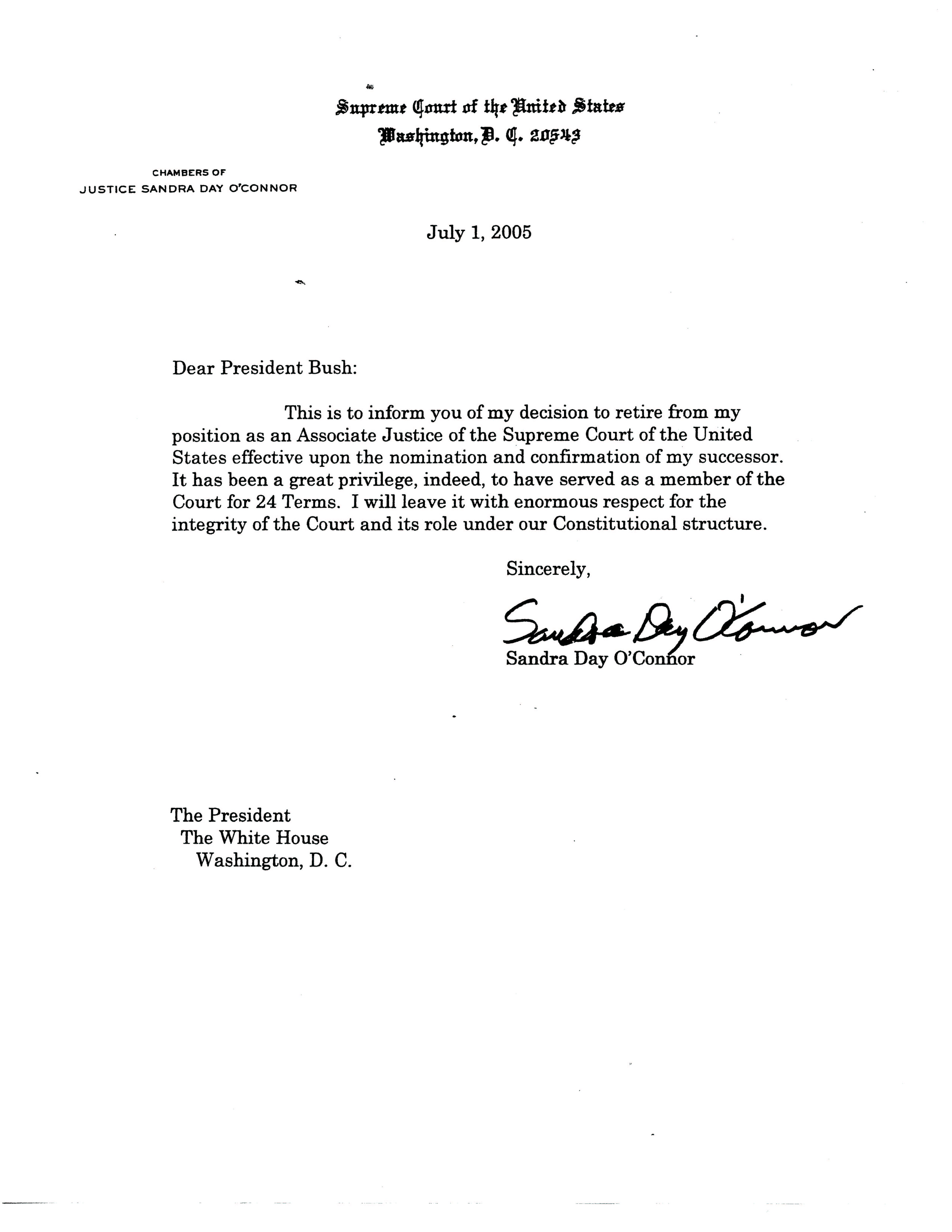
Justice O'Connor's letter to Bush, dated July 1, 2005, announcing her retirement

By 2005, the composition of the Court had been unchanged for eleven years, the second-longest period in American history without any such change. Rehnquist was widely expected to be the first justice to retire during Bush's term, owing to his age and his battle with cancer, although rumors of O'Connor's possible retirement circulated as well.

On July 1, 2005, O'Connor announced her intention to retire. In her letter to Bush, she stated that her retirement from active service would take effect upon the confirmation of her successor. Her letter did not provide a reason for her departure; however, a Supreme Court spokeswoman confirmed O'Connor was leaving to spend time with her husband.

On July 19, Bush nominated D.C. Circuit Judge John Roberts to succeed O'Connor. O'Connor heard the news over the car radio on the way back from a fishing trip. She described Roberts soon after the nomination as "good in every way, except he's not a woman".

O'Connor had expected to leave the Court before the next term started on October 3, 2005. However, Rehnquist died on September 3, creating an immediate vacancy on the Court. Two days later, Bush withdrew Roberts as his nominee for her seat and instead appointed him to fill the vacant office of Chief Justice. O'Connor agreed to stay on the Court until her replacement was named and confirmed. She spoke at the late chief justice's funeral. On October 3, Bush nominated White House Counsel Harriet Miers to replace O'Connor. After much criticism and controversy over her nomination, on October 27, Miers asked Bush to withdraw her nomination. Bush accepted, reopening the search for O'Connor's successor.

The continued delays in confirming a successor further extended O'Connor's time on the Court. She continued to hear oral argument on cases, including cases dealing with controversial issues such as physician-assisted suicide and abortion. O'Connor's last Court opinion, Ayotte v. Planned Parenthood of New England, written for a unanimous court, was a procedural decision that involved a challenge to a New Hampshire abortion law.

On October 31, Bush nominated Third Circuit Judge Samuel Alito to replace O'Connor; Alito was confirmed by a 58–42 vote and was sworn in on January 31, 2006. After retiring, she continued to hear cases and rendered over a dozen opinions in federal appellate courts across the country, filling in as a substitute judge when vacations or vacancies left their three-member panels understaffed. On Alito's nomination, O'Connor said, "I've often said, it's wonderful to be the first to do something but I didn't want to be the last. If I didn't do a good job, it might've been the last and indeed when I retired, I was not replaced, then, by a woman which gives one pause to think 'Oh, what did I do wrong that led to this.'"

== Post-Supreme Court career ==
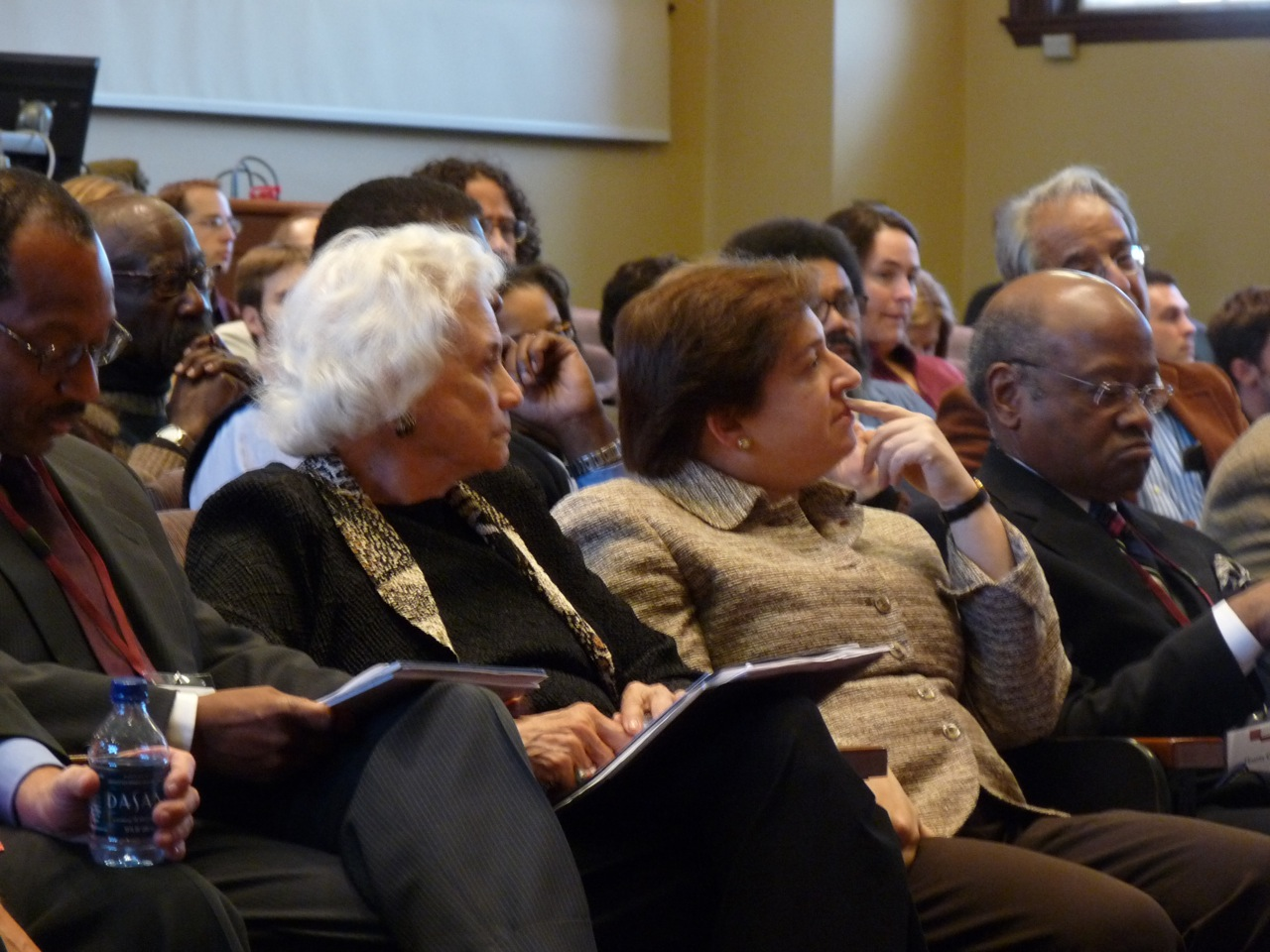
O'Connor in 2008 with Harvard Law School dean Elena Kagan. Kagan later became the fourth female justice on the Court.

In her retirement, O'Connor continued to speak and organize conferences on the issue of judicial independence. During a March 2006 speech at Georgetown University, O'Connor said some political attacks on the independence of the courts pose a direct threat to the constitutional freedoms of Americans. She said, "Any reform of the system is debatable as long as it is not motivated by retaliation for decisions that political leaders disagree with." She also noting that she was "against judicial reforms driven by nakedly partisan reasoning". "Courts interpret the law as it was written, not as the congressmen might have wished it was written", and "it takes a lot of degeneration before a country falls into dictatorship, but we should avoid these ends by avoiding these beginnings."

On November 19, 2008, O'Connor published an introductory essay on a themed judicial accountability issue in the Denver University Law Review. She called for a better public understanding of judicial accountability. On November 7, 2007, at a conference on her landmark opinion in Strickland v. Washington (1984) sponsored by the Constitution Project, O'Connor highlighted the lack of proper legal representation for many of the poorest defendants. O'Connor also urged the creation of a system for "merit selection for judges", a cause for which she had frequently advocated.

On August 7, 2008, O'Connor and Abdurrahman Wahid, former President of Indonesia, wrote an editorial in the Financial Times stating concerns about the threatened imprisonment of Malaysian opposition leader Anwar Ibrahim.

In October 2008, O'Connor spoke on racial equality in education at a conference hosted by the Charles Hamilton Houston Institute for Race and Justice at Harvard Law School. Later in the conference, she was awarded the Charles Hamilton Houston Justice Award alongside Desmond Tutu and Dolores Huerta.

Following the Court's Citizens United v. Federal Election Commission decision on corporate political spending, O'Connor offered measured criticism of the decision, telling Georgetown law students and lawyers, "that the Court has created an unwelcome new path for wealthy interests to exert influence on judicial elections."

O'Connor argued in favor of President Barack Obama naming the replacement for Antonin Scalia in February 2016, mere days after Scalia's death, opposing Republican arguments that the next president should get to fill the vacancy. She said, "I think we need somebody there to do the job now and let's get on with it. ... You just have to pick the best person you can under the circumstances, as the appointing authority must do. It's an important position and one that we care about as a nation and as a people. And I wish the president well as he makes choices and goes down that line. It's hard."

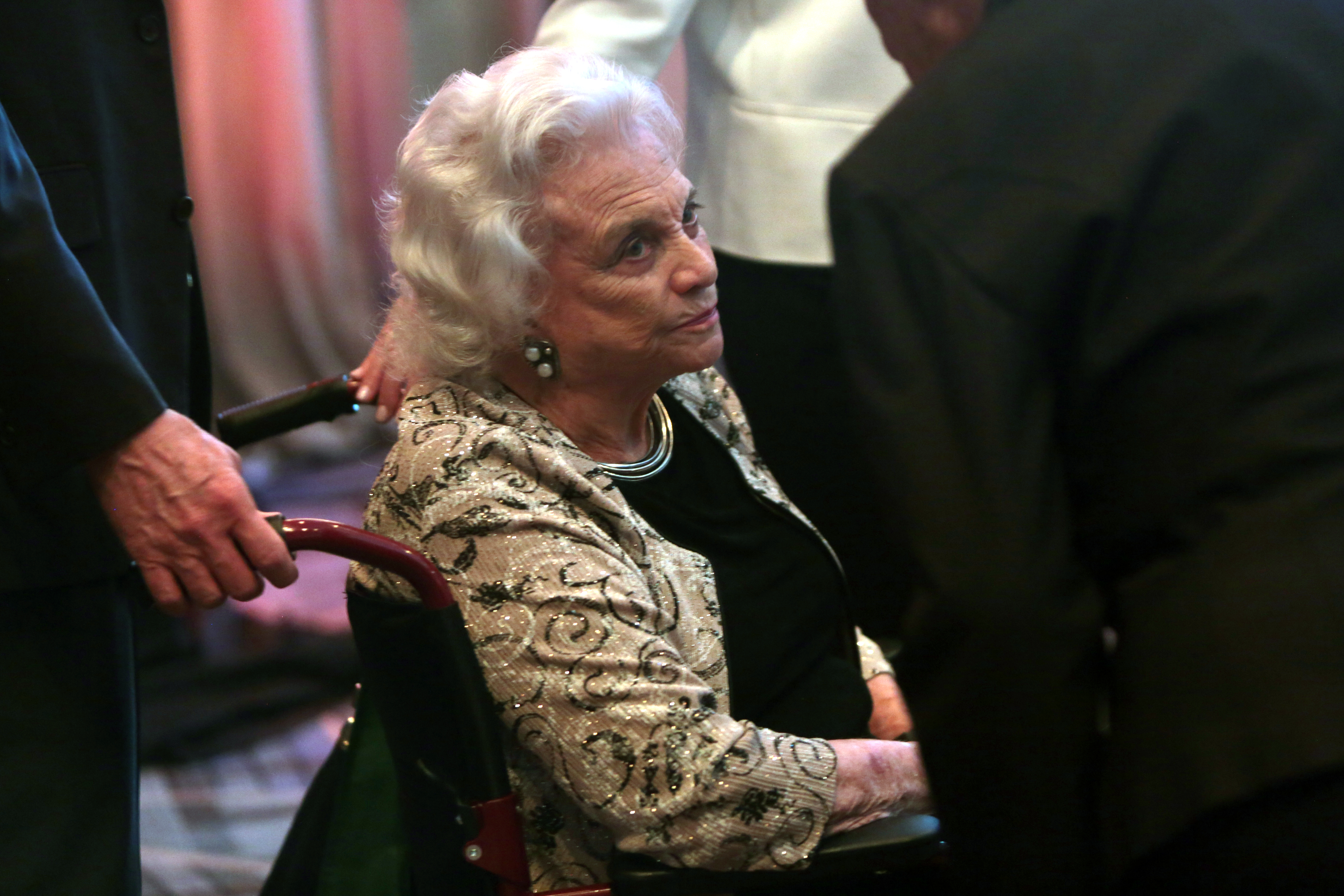
O'Connor in 2016

Judge William H. Pryor Jr., a conservative jurist, has criticized O'Connor's speeches and op-eds for hyperbole and factual inaccuracy, based in part on O'Connor's opinions as to whether judges face a rougher time in the public eye today than in the past.

O'Connor reflected on her time on the Supreme Court by saying that she regretted the Court hearing the Bush v. Gore case in 2000 because it "stirred up the public" and "gave the Court a less-than-perfect reputation". She told the Chicago Tribune that "maybe the Court should have said, 'We're not going to take it, goodbye,' ... It turned out the election authorities in Florida hadn't done a real good job there and kind of messed it up. And probably the Supreme Court added to the problem at the end of the day".

=== Activities and memberships ===
As a retired Supreme Court justice, O'Connor continued to receive a full salary, maintained a staffed office with at least one law clerk, and heard cases on a part-time basis in federal district courts and courts of appeals as a visiting judge. By 2008, O'Connor had sat for cases with the 2nd, 8th, and 9th Circuits. O'Connor heard an Arizona voting rights case which the Supreme Court later reviewed. In Arizona v. Inter Tribal Council of Arizona, a 7–2 majority affirmed O'Connor and the rest of 9th Circuit panel, and struck down a provision of Arizona's voting registration law. O'Connor hired a law clerk for the October 2015 term, but did not hire a law clerk for the subsequent term.

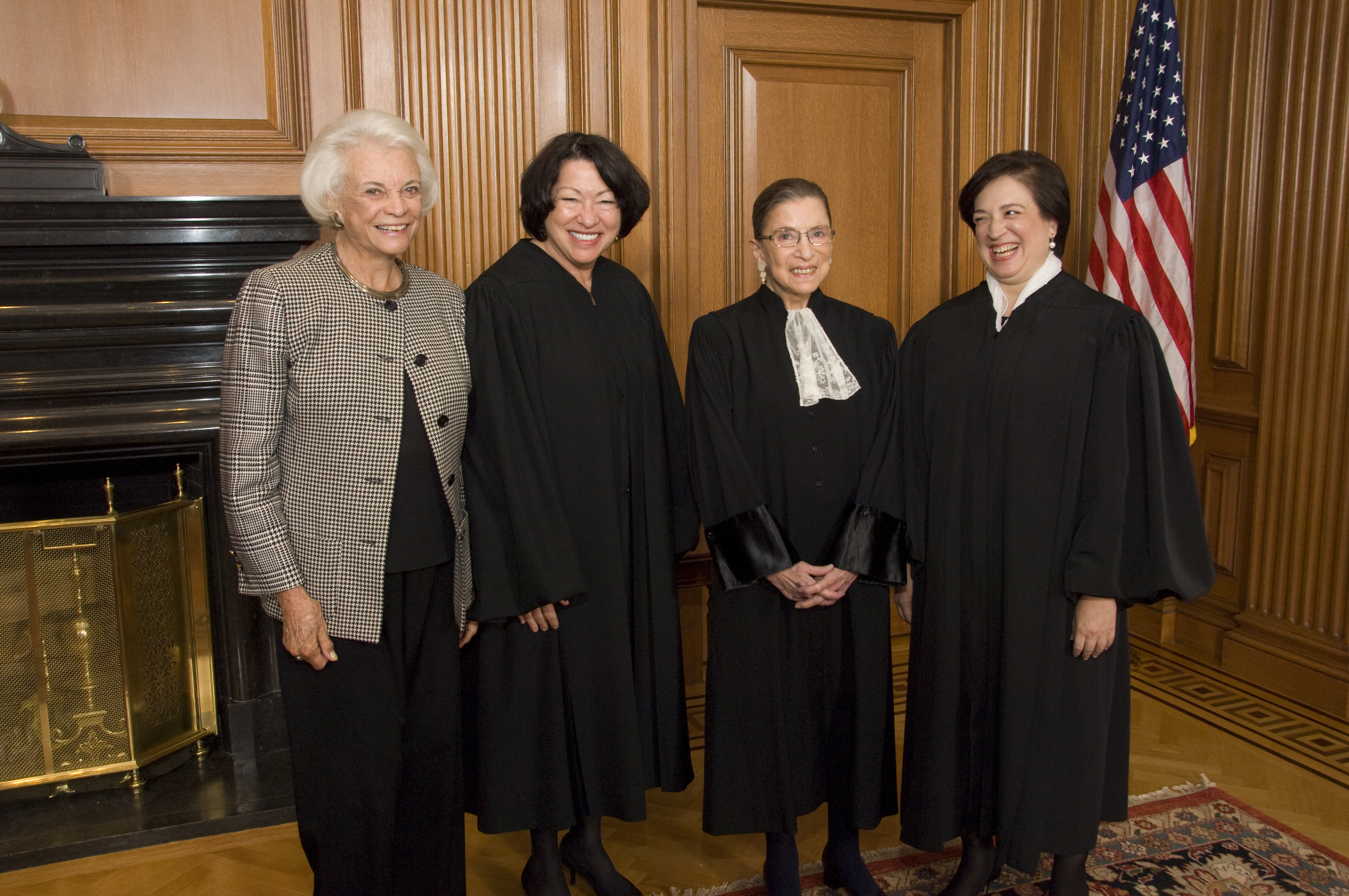
The first four women Supreme Court justices: O'Connor, Sonia Sotomayor, Ruth Bader Ginsburg, and Elena Kagan, 2010

O'Connor was elected as an honorary fellow of the National Academy of Public Administration in 2005. In October that year, O'Connor accepted the largely ceremonial role of becoming the 23rd Chancellor of the College of William & Mary. O'Connor continued in the role until 2012. O'Connor was a member of the 2006 Iraq Study Group, appointed by the U.S. Congress. From 2006, she was a trustee on the board of the Rockefeller Foundation. O'Connor chaired the Jamestown 2007 celebration, commemorating the 400th anniversary of the founding of the colony at Jamestown, Virginia, in 1607. The Sandra Day O'Connor Project on the State of the Judiciary, named for O'Connor, held annual conferences from 2006 through 2008 on the independence of the judiciary. O'Connor was a member of both the American Philosophical Society and the American Academy of Arts and Sciences.

==== Teaching ====
In 2006, O'Connor taught a course on the Supreme Court at the University of Arizona's James E. Rogers College of Law as a distinguished jurist in residence. On April 5, 2006, Arizona State University named its law school the Sandra Day O'Connor College of Law in her honor.

==== Publishing ====
External videos
- Presentation by O'Connor on Out of Order, March 18, 2013, C-SPAN
- Interview with O'Connor on Out of Order, August 30, 2014, C-SPAN

O'Connor wrote the 2013 book Out of Order: Stories from the History of the Supreme Court.

==== Public speaking engagements ====
On May 15, 2006, O'Connor gave the commencement address at the William & Mary School of Law, where she said that judicial independence is "under serious attack at both the state and national level". In 2008, O'Connor was named an inaugural Harry Rathbun Visiting Fellow by the Office for Religious Life at Stanford University. On April 22, 2008, she gave "Harry's Last Lecture on a Meaningful Life" in honor of the former Stanford Law professor who shaped her undergraduate and law careers. On September 17, 2014, O'Connor appeared on the television show Jeopardy! and provided a couple of video answers to the category 'Supreme Court' which appeared on the show. On the same day in Concord, New Hampshire, she gave a talk alongside her former colleague Justice David Souter about the importance of meaningful civics education in the United States.

==== Non-profits and philanthropic activity ====
In February 2009, O'Connor launched Our Courts, a website she created to offer interactive civics lessons to students and teachers because she was concerned about the lack of knowledge among most young Americans about how their government works. She also served as a co-chair with Lee H. Hamilton for the Campaign for the Civic Mission of Schools. On March 3, 2009, O'Connor appeared on the satirical television program The Daily Show with Jon Stewart to promote the website. In August 2009, the website added two online interactive games. The initiative expanded, becoming iCivics in May 2010 offering free lesson plans, games, and interactive videogames for middle and high school educators. By 2015, the iCivics games had 72,000 teachers as registered users and its games had been played 30 million times.

O'Connor served on the board of trustees of the National Constitution Center in Philadelphia, a museum dedicated to the U.S. Constitution. By November 2015, O'Connor had transitioned to being a trustee emeritus for the center. In April 2013, the board of directors of Justice at Stake, a national judicial reform advocacy organization, announced that O'Connor would be joining the organization as honorary chair.

In 2009, O'Connor founded the 501(c)(3) non-profit organization now known as the Sandra Day O'Connor Institute. Its programs are dedicated to promoting civil discourse, civic engagement, and civics education. In 2019, her former adobe residence in Arizona, curated by the O'Connor Institute, was listed on the National Register of Historic Places. In 2022, the Institute launched Civics for Life, its multigenerational digital platform.

O'Connor was a member and president of the Junior League of Phoenix.

O'Connor was a founding co-chair of the National Advisory Board at the National Institute for Civil Discourse (NICD). The institute was created at the University of Arizona after the 2011 shooting of former Congresswoman Gabby Giffords that killed six people and wounded 13 others.

== Personal life, illness and death ==
Upon her appointment to the Supreme Court, O'Connor and her husband moved to the Kalorama area of Washington, D.C. The O'Connors became active in the Washington, D.C. social scene. O'Connor played tennis and golf in her spare time. She was a baptized member of the Episcopal Church.

O'Connor was successfully treated for breast cancer in 1988, and she also had her appendix removed that year. That same year, John O'Connor left the Washington, D.C., law firm of Miller & Chevalier for a practice that required him to split his time between Washington, D.C. and Phoenix.

Her husband suffered from Alzheimer's disease for nearly 20 years, until his death in 2009, and she became involved in raising awareness of the disease. After retiring from the Court, O'Connor moved back to Phoenix, Arizona.

Around 2013, O'Connor's friends and colleagues noticed that she was becoming more forgetful and less talkative. By 2017, back problems led to her needing to use a wheelchair, and to her moving to an assisted living facility. In October 2018, O'Connor announced her effective retirement from public life after disclosing that she had been diagnosed with the early stages of dementia.

On May 7, 2016, her younger sister, Ann Day, was killed in a car accident in Tucson, Arizona, as a result of a collision with a drunk driver.

On December 1, 2023, O'Connor died in Phoenix, at the age of 93, due to complications related to advanced dementia and a respiratory illness. After her death, Chief Justice John Roberts called her "an eloquent advocate for civil education" and a "fiercely independent defender of the rule of law" in a public statement. President Joe Biden said she was an "American icon", dedicated to public service and the "bedrock American principle of an independent judiciary". iCivics board chairman Larry Kramer said that O'Connor was "kind and generous" and relayed that iCivics was her "brainchild".

O'Connor lay in repose in the Great Hall of the Supreme Court on December 18, 2023. She was memorialized the following day in a funeral service held at the Washington National Cathedral.

== Legacy and awards ==
O'Connor was particularly remembered for being the first woman on the Court, and for functioning as the swing vote in the 5–4 decision in Bush v. Gore, which handed the presidency to George W. Bush. Overall, she began her tenure on the court as a Reaganite but would later attempt to steer the court toward decisions that better aligned with public opinion. Some argue that O'Connor's jurisprudential legacy was largely undone by the appointment of Samuel Alito as her successor.

In March 2019, historian and journalist Evan Thomas published a biography detailing O'Connor's life, pulling from interviews and her archives, and becoming a New York Times Bestseller and finalist for the Los Angeles Times Book Prize.

== See also ==
- List of justices of the Supreme Court of the United States
- List of law clerks for the eighth seat of the Supreme Court of the United States
- List of United States Supreme Court justices by time in office
- List of United States federal judges by longevity of service
- United States Supreme Court cases during the Burger Court
- United States Supreme Court cases during the Rehnquist Court
- United States Supreme Court cases during the Roberts Court
- List of female state supreme court justices

Arizona Senate
Preceded by Isabel Burgess	Member of the Arizona Senate from the 8-E district 1969–1971	Succeeded by Constituency abolished
Preceded by Constituency established	Member of the Arizona Senate from the 20th district 1971–1973	Succeeded by Bess Stinson
Preceded by Howard S. Baldwin	Member of the Arizona Senate from the 24th district 1973–1975	Succeeded by John Pritzlaff
Legal offices
Preceded by Potter Stewart	Associate Justice of the Supreme Court of the United States; 1981–2006	Succeeded by Samuel Alito
Academic offices
Preceded by Henry Kissinger	Chancellor of the College of William and Mary; 2005–2012	Succeeded by Robert Gates
